= List of historical novels =

This list outlines notable historical novels by the current geo-political boundaries of countries for the historical location in which most of the novel takes place. This list includes only the most notable novels within the genre, which have been included in Wikipedia. For a more comprehensive automatically generated list of articles on Wikipedia about historical novels, see Category:Historical novels. For a comprehensive list by time period on historical fiction in general see list of historical fiction by time period.

== Afghanistan ==
- The Afghan Campaign by Steven Pressfield (Alexander the Great's invasion of the Afghan kingdoms in 330 BC)
- Flashman by George MacDonald Fraser (1840s, First Anglo-Afghan War)
- Caravans by James Michener (post-World War II)

== Argentina ==
- On Heroes and Tombs by Ernesto Sabato (19th century, during the Civil War)
- Facundo: Civilization and Barbarism by Domingo F. Sarmiento (19th century)
- Santa Evita by Tomás Eloy Martínez (20th century, Eva Perón)

== Australia ==
- The Playmaker and Bring Larks and Heroes by Thomas Keneally (18th century colonial Australia)
- Morgan's Run by Colleen McCullough (end of the 18th century)
- Destiny in Sydney by D. Manning Richards (1787–1902 Scots-Irish, Aboriginal, and Chinese family saga story)
- The Lambing Flat by Nerida Newton (mid-19th century Australian gold rushes)
- The Secret River by Kate Grenville (19th century colonial Australia)
- Jack Maggs by Peter Carey (19th century colonial Australia)
- The Thorn Birds by Colleen McCullough (end of the 19th century)
- True History of the Kelly Gang by Peter Carey (Kelly Gang, 1878–1880)
- An Angel in Australia by Thomas Keneally (World War II)
- Oscar and Lucinda by Peter Carey
- Jasper Jones by Craig Silvey (1960s Western Australia)
- Bila Yarrudhanggalangdhuray by Anita Heiss (19th century indigenous New South Wales)

== Austria ==
- The Man Without Qualities by Robert Musil (World War I)

== Bangladesh ==
- The Black Coat by Neamat Imam (Sheikh Mujibur Rahman's rule in Bangladesh, 1972–75, including famine of 1974)

== Belgium ==
- The Legend of Thyl Ulenspiegel and Lamme Goedzak by Charles De Coster (Protestant Reformation in the Netherlands)
- The Sorrow of Belgium (Het verdriet van België) by Hugo Claus (WW II and after)

== Bosnia and Herzegovina ==
- The Bridge on the Drina by Ivo Andrić (1500s–1900s)

== Brazil ==
- Alfarrábios by José de Alencar (Colonial Brazil)
- Iracema by José de Alencar (legend from Ceara, 16th century)
- The Guarani by José de Alencar (Brazil, 16th century)
- Brazil Red by Jean-Christophe Rufin (France Antarctique, 16th century)
- As Minas de Prata (The Silver Mines) by José de Alencar (Minas Gerais, 18th century)
- Time and the Wind (O Tempo e o Vento) by Érico Veríssimo (from the late 18th century to 1945)
- Rebellion in the Backlands (Os Sertões) by Euclides da Cunha (Canudos Campaign, 19th century)
- The War of the End of the World (La guerra del fin del mundo) by Mario Vargas Llosa (Canudos Campaign, 19th century)

== Canada ==
- The Orenda by Joseph Boyden (17th-century Quebec)
- The Last Crossing by Guy Vanderhaeghe (19th century western Canada)
- All That Matters by Wayson Choy (1920s–1940s Vancouver)
- Journey by James A. Michener
- Alias Grace by Margaret Atwood
- Three Day Road by Joseph Boyden
- The Colony of Unrequited Dreams by Wayne Johnston
- The Book of Negroes by Lawrence Hill
- In the Skin of a Lion by Michael Ondaatje
- Jalna by Mazo de la Roche
- The Jade Peony by Wayson Choy (1930s–1940s Vancouver)

== Caribbean (multiple countries) ==
- Unburnable by Marie-Elena John (the African origins of Caribbean culture and the original inhabitants of the Caribbean, the Kalinago (Carib Indians)).
- Caribbean by James A. Michener

== Chile ==
- My Tender Matador by Pedro Lemebel

== China ==
- Empress by Shan Sa (Wu Zetian, 1st century)
- Chia Black Dragon series by Stephen Marley (2nd century, 7th century)
- Romance of the Three Kingdoms by Luo Guanzhong (3rd century)
- The Journeyer by Gary Jennings (Kublai Khan, 13th century)
- The Deer and the Cauldron by Jin Yong - Early Qing dynasty during the rule of the Kangxi Emperor. (1654–89)
- The Story of the Stone by Cao Xueqin (18th century)
- Tai-Pan by James Clavell (Hong Kong, 1841)
- Peony by Pearl Buck (19th century, Jewish family in China)
- Imperial Woman by Pearl Buck (about Empress Dowager Cixi)
- Empress Orchid by Anchee Min (about Empress Dowager Cixi)
- The Last Empress by Anchee Min (about Empress Dowager Cixi)
- Empire of the Sun by J. G. Ballard (World War II)
- Dragon Seed by Pearl Buck (Life of Chinese peasant family during Second Sino-Japanese War)
- Noble House by James Clavell (Hong Kong, 1963)

== Colombia ==
- The General in his Labyrinth by Gabriel García Márquez

== Czech Republic ==
- Witiko by Adalbert Stifter (Witiko of Prčice, 12th century Bohemia)

== Denmark ==
- Number the Stars by Lois Lowry (20th century)

== Dominican Republic ==
- In the Time of the Butterflies by Julia Alvarez (rebellion against Rafael Leónidas Trujillo, mid-20th century)
- The Feast of the Goat (La Fiesta del Chivo) by Mario Vargas Llosa (Assassination of Trujillo and its aftermath, early 1960s)

== Egypt ==
- Cheops by Paul West (26th century BC)
- Pharaoh by Bolesław Prus (fall of Egypt's Twentieth Dynasty and New Kingdom)
- Hypatia by Charles Kingsley (late Roman Egypt)
- The Egyptian by Mika Waltari (reign of Pharaoh Akhenaten)
- The Memoirs of Cleopatra by Margaret George (reign of Cleopatra VII)
- River God by Wilbur Smith
- Leo Africanus by Amin Maalouf (15th and 16th century)

== Estonia ==
- Purge by Sofi Oksanen (20th century)

== Finland ==
- The Adventurer by Mika Waltari (16th century)

== France ==
- The Jester by James Patterson (11th century)
- The Badger of Ghissi by Wolf von Niebelschütz (12th century)
- The Accursed Kings (Les Rois maudits) series by Maurice Druon (14th century)
- Quentin Durward by Sir Walter Scott (Louis XI – 15th century)
- The Hunchback of Notre-Dame by Victor Hugo (15th century)
- The Princess of Cleves by Madame de La Fayette (16th century, court of Henry II)
- Queen Margot by Alexandre Dumas, père (16th century)
- The Angélique series by Anne & Serge Golon (mid-17th century in the reign of Louis XIV)
- The d'Artagnan romances (The Three Musketeers, Twenty Years After, and The Vicomte de Bragelonne) by Alexandre Dumas, père (17th century)
- A Place of Greater Safety by Hilary Mantel (French Revolution)
- A Tale of Two Cities by Charles Dickens (French Revolution)
- Scaramouche by Rafael Sabatini (French Revolution)
- Ninety-Three by Victor Hugo (1793, French Revolution)
- The Rover by Joseph Conrad (Revolutionary and Napoleonic periods)
- Les Misérables by Victor Hugo (19th century)
- The Count of Monte Cristo by Alexandre Dumas, père (19th century)
- Cézanne’s Quarry by Barbara Corrado Pope, (Belle Époque)
- The Blood of Lorraine by Barbara Corrado Pope, (Belle Époque)
- The Missing Italian Girl by Barbara Corrado Pope, (Belle Époque)
- An Officer and a Spy by Robert Harris (the Dreyfus affair)
- The Four Horsemen of the Apocalypse by Vicente Blasco Ibáñez (World War I)

== Germany ==
- Eagle in the Snow by Wallace Breem (Germania, 4th century, Magnus Maximus)
- Q (1999) by Luther Blissett (15th-century Europe during the Protestant reformation and German Peasants' War)
- Measuring the World by Daniel Kehlmann (19th century)
- Night Thoughts of a Classical Physicist by Russell McCormmach (development of physics in the early 20th century)
- The Seventh Gate by Richard Zimler (1930s Berlin)
- The Book Thief by Markus Zusak (World War II)

== Greece ==
- Hades' Daughter by Sara Douglass (classical antiquity)
- Tides of War: A Novel of Alcibiades and the Peloponnesian War by Steven Pressfield
- The Palaeologian Dynasty. The Rise and Fall of Byzantium by George Leonardos
- Gates of Fire by Steven Pressfield (the Battle of Thermopylae)
- Middlesex by Jeffrey Eugenides (World War I and Greco-Turkish War)
- The Last of the Wine by Mary Renault (Athens in the time of Socrates)
- The Mask of Apollo by Mary Renault (Greek theatre, 4th century BC)
- The Athenian Murders (La caverna de las ideas) by Jose Carlos Somoza (classical antiquity)
- Lion of Macedon by David Gemmell (Alexander's general Parmenion)
- Fire from Heaven and The Persian Boy by Mary Renault (Alexander the Great)
- Funeral Games by Mary Renault (the successors of Alexander)
- Goat Song by Frank Yerby (Peloponnesian War)

== Greenland ==
- The Greenlanders by Jane Smiley

== Haiti ==
- Lydia Bailey by Kenneth Roberts (1800s Haitian Revolution)
- The Kingdom of This World by Alejo Carpentier (Haitian Revolution)
- Island Beneath the Sea by Isabel Allende (late 18th century)
- Babouk by Guy Endore (Haitian Revolution)

== Hungary ==
- A Town in Black (1910) by Kálmán Mikszáth (set in the 18th c.)
- Fatelessness (Sorstalanság) (2001) by Imre Kertész (Nobel Prize winner, set in World War II)
- Prague (2002) by Arthur Phillips (set in the 1990s)

== Iceland ==
- Eric Brighteyes by H. Rider Haggard (10th century, Viking Age)
- The Fated Sky by Henrietta Branford (Viking Age)
- Burial Rites by Hannah Kent (1820s, Agnes Magnúsdóttir)

== India ==
=== Bengali ===
- Durgeshnôndini and Anondomôţh by Bankim Chandra Chattopadhyay
- The Home and the World (Ghôre Baire) by Rabindranath Tagore

=== English ===
- A Spoke in the Wheel by Amita Kanekar (Gautama Buddha/Ashoka)
- Chanakya's Chant by Ashwin Sanghi (4th century BC)
- Empire of the Moghul series by Alex Rutherford (Moghul Empire, Babur to Aurangzeb)
- Guardian of the Dawn by Richard Zimler (17th century Goa)
- The Far Pavilions by M. M. Kaye (British India in the 19th century)
- The Ibis trilogy by Amitav Ghosh (before and during the First Opium War)
- The Siege of Krishnapur by J. G. Farrell (Indian Rebellion of 1857)
- Midnight's Children by Salman Rushdie (Partition of India)

=== Hindi ===
- From Volga to Ganga by Mahapandit Rahul Sankrityayan

=== Malayalam ===
- Marthandavarma (1891), Dharmaraja (1913), Ramarajabahadur (1918–1919) by C V Raman Pillai

=== Tamil ===
- Parthiban Kanavu and Sivagamiyin Sabadham by Kalki Krishnamurthy (Pallava dynasty)
- Ponniyin Selvan by Kalki Krishnamurthy (Chola dynasty)
- Vengaiyin Mayinthan by Akilan (Rajendra Chola I, 11th century)

=== Telugu ===
- Veyipadagalu (1934) by Viswanatha Satyanarayana

=== Urdu ===
- Aag Ka Darya (River of Fire) by Qurratulain Hyder
- Aangan (Courtyard) by Khadija Mastoor
- Bano by Razia Butt

=== Gujarati ===
- Karan Ghelo by Nandshankar Mehta

== Indonesia ==
- This Earth of Mankind (Bumi Manusia), Child of All Nations (Anak Semua Bangsa), Footsteps (Jejak Langkah) and House of Glass (Rumah Kaca) by Pramoedya Ananta Toer (Dutch colonialism, late 19th early 20th century)
- Max Havelaar by Multatuli (Dutch colonialism, 19th century)

== Iran ==
- Cry of the Peacock by Gina B. Nahai (Jews in Iran, 18th–20th centuries)
- Whirlwind by James Clavell (Iranian Revolution, 1979)

== Ireland ==
- The Princes of Ireland: The Dublin Saga and The Rebels of Ireland: The Dublin Saga by Edward Rutherfurd (Dublin, 430 to the Great Famine)
- Sister Fidelma series by Peter Tremayne (7th century)
- Lion of Ireland by Morgan Llywelyn (High King Brian Boru, 10th century)
- The Good People by Hannah Kent (1825, County Kerry)
- The Silent People by Walter Macken (The Great Famine, 19th century)
- Trinity and Redemption by Leon Uris (19th–early 20th century)
- A Star Called Henry by Roddy Doyle (Irish Revolution)
- Troubles by J. G. Farrell (Irish War of Independence)

== Israel ==
- The Source by James A. Michener (earliest days to 1964)
- The King of Flesh and Blood by Moshe Shamir (2nd century BCE)
- King Jesus by Robert Graves (1st century)
- Ben-Hur: A Tale of the Christ by Lew Wallace (1st century)
- The Antagonists: A Novel of Masada by Ernest K. Gann (1st century)
- The Gospel According to Lazarus by Richard Zimler (1st century)
- Holy Warrior by Angus Donald, second novel in the Outlaw Chronicles (12th century)
- Jerusalem by Cecelia Holland (12th century)
- The Talisman by Sir Walter Scott (12th century, Third Crusade)
- Knight Crusader by Ronald Welch (12th century: Battle of Hattin, Third Crusade)
- Exodus by Leon Uris (SS Exodus and the founding of Israel)
- The Haj by Leon Uris (1920s–1950s)
- The Hope by Herman Wouk (Creation of Israel to the Six-Day War, 1948–1967)
- The Glory by Herman Wouk (Six-Day War to Peace with Egypt, 1967–1978)
- Inside, Outside by Herman Wouk (Four generations of a Russian Jewish family in the 20th century)
- Vengeance by George Jonas (Following Operation Wrath of God - the Israeli hunt for the 1972 Munich Olympics massacre planners).

== Italy ==
=== Ancient Rome ===
- Scipio trilogy by Santiago Posteguillo (the Punic Wars general Publius Cornelius Scipio)
- The Masters of Rome series by Colleen McCullough (1st century BC)
- The Gods of War (Life of Julius Caesar)
- The Ides of March by Thornton Wilder (Last days of Julius Caesar)
- I Am a Barbarian by Edgar Rice Burroughs (The life of Caligula as seen through the eyes of his slave)
- I, Claudius and Claudius the God by Robert Graves (Roman emperors, 1st century)
- Quo Vadis by Henryk Sienkiewicz (Christians under Nero)
- The Roman Mysteries, a series of children's books by Caroline Lawrence (late 1st century)
- Trajan trilogy by Santiago Posteguillo (Trajan life)
- Memoirs of Hadrian by Marguerite Yourcenar (life and death of Roman Emperor Hadrian)
- Julian by Gore Vidal (Julian the Apostate, 4th century)
- Count Belisarius by Robert Graves (the Byzantine general Belisarius, 6th century)
- Raptor by Gary Jennings (5th–6th centuries)
- A Struggle for Rome (Ein Kampf um Rom) by Felix Dahn (Gothic War)

=== Medieval and modern Italy ===
- Baudolino by Umberto Eco (12th century)
- Valperga by Mary Shelley (14th century; Guelphs and Ghibellines)
- The Name of the Rose by Umberto Eco (14th century)
- The Birth of Venus by Sarah Dunant (Florence, Savonarola period)
- Prince of Foxes by Samuel Shellabarger (Renaissance)
- Romola by George Eliot (Renaissance)
- The Family by Mario Puzo (Renaissance)
- The Betrothed by Alessandro Manzoni (17th century)
- Silk by Alessandro Baricco (1860s)
- The Prague Cemetery by Umberto Eco (19th century)

== Japan ==
- Musashi by Eiji Yoshikawa (Miyamoto Musashi, 17th century)
- Shōgun, Gai-Jin & King Rat by James Clavell
- Silence by Shusaku Endo (Jesuit missionary in the 17th century)
- The Samurai by Shusaku Endo (The journey of four samurai to Spain in the 17th century)
- The Tale of Genji by Murasaki Shikibu, 11th century
- The Thousand Autumns of Jacob de Zoet by David Mitchell (Dutch trading concession with Japan in the late 18th century)
- The Tale of the Heike (Heike Monogatari) by Yoshida Kenkō, (Genpei War)

== Korea ==
- A Single Shard by Linda Sue Park

== Malta ==
- The Siege of Malta by Walter Scott

== Mexico ==
- Mexico by James A. Michener
- Aztec by Gary Jennings (Aztec Empire before Spanish invasion)
- Aztec Autumn by Gary Jennings (Aztec Empire, one generation after Spanish invasion)
- Captain from Castile by Samuel Shellabarger (16th century)
- Hunger's Brides by Paul Anderson (17th century, Sor Juana)
- Caballero by Jovita González and Eve Raleigh (1840s)
- Cartucho by Nellie Campobello (Mexican Revolution)
- The Power and the Glory by Graham Greene (1930s)
- Aztec and Aztec Autumn by Gary Jennings (16th century)

== Netherlands ==
- Girl with a Pearl Earring by Tracy Chevalier (Johannes Vermeer, 17th century)
- The Black Tulip by Alexandre Dumas, père (17th century)
- The Cloister and the Hearth by Charles Reade (15th century)
- The Coffee Trader by David Liss (17th century)
- The Miniaturist by Jessie Burton (17th century Amsterdam)

== New Zealand ==
- The Luminaries by Eleanor Catton (1860s New Zealand gold rush)
- Season of the Jew by Maurice Shadbolt (mid-nineteenth century New Zealand)

== Norway ==
- Kristin Lavransdatter by Sigrid Undset (14th century)
- The Master of Hestviken by Sigrid Undset (14th century)

== Pakistan ==
- Khaak aur Khoon by Naseem Hijazi
- Shaheen by Naseem Hijazi
- Shahab Nama by Qudratullah Shahab

== Peru ==
- The Virgin of the Sun by H. Rider Haggard (Inca Empire)

== Philippines ==
- Noli Me Tángere by José Rizal (early 1880s Philippines, under Spanish colonial rule)
- El filibusterismo by José Rizal (set 13 years after the events of Noli Me Tángere)
- The Woman Who had Two Navels by Nick Joaquin
- Po-on by F. Sionil José (Set in the late 19th century.)

== Poland ==
- Poland by James A. Michener (13th century onward)
- The Knights of the Cross (Krzyzacy) by Henryk Sienkiewicz (Teutonic Knights, 14th century)
- The Trilogy by Henryk Sienkiewicz (17th century, including the Khmelnytsky Uprising and The Deluge)
- Thaddeus of Warsaw by Jane Porter (Polish–Lithuanian Commonwealth)
- The Books of Jacob (Księgi Jakubowe) by Olga Tokarczuk (First Polish Republic, 18th century)
- Push Not the River by James Conroyd Martin (1792 Partition of Poland)
- The Faithful River (Wierna rzeka) by Stefan Żeromski (January Uprising, 1863–1865)
- The Warsaw Anagrams by Richard Zimler (Warsaw Ghetto, 1940–1943)
- Stones for the Rampart (Kamienie na szaniec) by Aleksander Kamiński (Polish Scouting or Gray Ranks during World War II)

== Portugal ==
- The Last Kabbalist of Lisbon by Richard Zimler (early 16th-century Lisbon, Lisbon Massacre of 1506)
- Baltasar and Blimunda by José Saramago (18th-century construction of the Convent of Mafra)
- Hunting Midnight by Richard Zimler (19th century Porto)

== Russia ==
- War and Peace by Leo Tolstoy (Napoleonic era)
- The Life of Klim Samgin by Maxim Gorky (World War I and Russian 1917 Revolution)
- Blood Red, Snow White by Marcus Sedgwick (Russian 1917 Revolution)
- Doctor Zhivago by Boris Pasternak (Russian 1917 Revolution and Russian Civil War)
- And Quiet Flows the Don by Mikhail Sholokhov (Russian 1917 Revolution and Russian Civil War)
- The White Guard by Mikhail Bulgakov (Russian Civil War)
- Life and Fate by Vasily Grossman (Eastern Front)
- The Red Wheel by Aleksandr Solzhenitsyn (World War I and Russian 1917 Revolution)
- Russka by Edward Rutherfurd (1800 years of Russian history from pre-Russia to the beginning of the Russian Revolution)

== Sicily ==
- The Lady of the Wheel by Angelo F. Coniglio (19th century foundlings and sulfur mine workers)
- The Leopard or Il Gattopardo by Giuseppe Tomasi di Lampedusa (19th century Risorgimento, Giuseppe Garibaldi)
- The Sicilian by Mario Puzo (Fictionalized biography of Sicilian popular hero Salvatore Giuliano.)

== South Africa ==
- The Covenant by James A. Michener (from prehistory onwards)
- King Solomon's Mines by H. Rider Haggard (19th century)

== Spain ==
- A Dying Light in Corduba by Lindsey Davis (Roman Spain)
- Tales of Count Lucanor by Don Juan Manuel, príncipe de Villena (14th century)
- Tales of the Alhambra by Washington Irving (Emirato de Granada)
- Don Quixote (El ingenioso hidalgo Don Quijote de la Mancha) by Miguel de Cervantes Saavedra (16th century)
- Adventures of Captain Alatriste series by Arturo Pérez-Reverte
- The Heretic: A Novel of the Inquisition by Miguel Delibes (16th century in Valladolid)
- The King Amaz'd (Crónica del rey pasmado) by Gonzalo Torrente Ballester (Court of Felipe IV)
- Life and facts of Estebanillo González, man of good humour by Anonymous (Thirty Years' War)
- The Life of Lazarillo de Tormes and of His Fortunes and Adversities (La vida de Lazarillo de Tormes y de sus fortunas y adversidades) by Anonymous
- The Tragicomedy of Calisto and Melibea (La Celestina) by Fernando de Rojas
- Paul the Sharper or The Scavenger (El Buscón) by Francisco de Quevedo
- The Heart of Jade (El Corazón de piedra verde) by Salvador de Madariaga
- The Islands of Unwisdom by Robert Graves (Álvaro de Mendaña)
- Captain From Castile by Samuel Shellabarger (Hernán Cortés' Conquest of Mexico)
- National Episodes by Benito Pérez Galdós (19th century)
- La regenta by Leopoldo Alas "Clarín" (19th century)
- Fortunata y Jacinta by Benito Pérez Galdós (19th century)
- El húsar by Arturo Pérez-Reverte (Napoleonic age)
- The Fencing Master by Arturo Pérez-Reverte (Isabella II age)
- Winter in Madrid by C. J. Sansom
- Línea de fuego by Arturo Pérez-Reverte

== Sweden ==
- The Long Ships by Frans G. Bengtsson (Vikings, 10th century)
- The Emigrants by Vilhelm Moberg (middle of the 19th century)

== Switzerland ==
- Anne of Geierstein by Sir Walter Scott (15th century)

== Syria ==
- The End of a Brave Man by Hanna Mina (20th century)

== Turkey ==
- A Mind at Peace (Huzur) by Ahmet Hamdi Tanpınar (20th century, 1930s Istanbul)

== United Kingdom ==
=== Earliest history ===
- Stonehenge: A Novel of 2000 BC by Bernard Cornwell (Stonehenge)
- Pillar of the Sky by Cecelia Holland (Stonehenge)
- The Stronghold by Mollie Hunter (Orkney in the 1st century BC)

=== Roman Britain ===
- Under the Eagle and others in the Cato series by Simon Scarrow (Roman invasion, AD 42)
- The Silver Pigs, A Body in the Bath House and The Jupiter Myth by Lindsey Davis (crime in the reign of Vespasian, 1st century AD)
- The Eagle of the Ninth by Rosemary Sutcliff (2nd century AD)
- The Silver Branch by Rosemary Sutcliff (3rd century AD)
- The Forest House, and others in the series by Marion Zimmer Bradley

=== Medieval ===
- Porius by John Cowper Powys (Arthurian, 5th century)
- Sword at Sunset by Rosemary Sutcliff (Arthurian)
- The Saxon Shore by Jack Whyte (Arthurian)
- Grail Prince by Nancy McKenzie (Galahad)
- Hild by Nicola Griffith (7th century)
- The Saxon Stories by Bernard Cornwell (Alfred the Great, (9th century)
- Avalon by Anya Seton (10th century)
- The Conqueror by Georgette Heyer (William the Conqueror, 11th century)
- Hereward the Wake by Charles Kingsley (Hereward the Wake, 11th century)
- The Wake by Paul Kingsnorth (11th century)
- Outlaw by Angus Donald, the first novel in the Outlaw Chronicles (12th century)
- King's Man by Angus Donald, the third in the above series (12th century)
- The Pillars of the Earth by Ken Follett (12th-century)
- Ivanhoe by Sir Walter Scott (12th century)
- Kay the Left-Handed by Leslie Barringer (12th century)
- Lady of the Forest by Jennifer Roberson (12th century)
- Time and Chance by Sharon Kay Penman (12th century)
- The Devil's Brood by Sharon Kay Penman (12th century)
- Here Be Dragons by Sharon Kay Penman (Wales, 13th century)
- The Reckoning by Sharon Kay Penman (13th century Wales)
- The Heaven Tree Trilogy by Edith Pargeter (13th century Wales)
- The Brothers of Gwynedd Quartet by Edith Pargeter (13th century Wales)
- The Fair Maid of Perth by Sir Walter Scott (14th-century Scotland)
- The Grail Quest by Bernard Cornwell (14th century)
- Katherine by Anya Seton (14th century)
- Company of Liars by Karen Maitland (14th century)
- World Without End by Ken Follett (14th century)
- Owen Glendower by John Cowper Powys (15th century Wales)
- Know Ye Not Agincourt? by Leslie Barringer (15th century)
- The Sunne in Splendour by Sharon Kay Penman (15th century)
- The Load of Unicorn by Cynthia Harnett (Caxton, 15th century London)

=== Tudor and Stuart ===
- The House of Niccolò and Lymond Chronicles by Dorothy Dunnett (Scotland and beyond, 15th and 16th centuries)
- The Fortunes of Perkin Warbeck by Mary Shelley (Henry VII and Perkin Warbeck)
- Wolf Hall by Hilary Mantel (Thomas Cromwell's rise to power)
- Bring up the Bodies by Hilary Mantel (Thomas Cromwell and Anne Boleyn)
- The Other Boleyn Girl by Philippa Gregory (Mary Boleyn)
- The Fifth Queen by Ford Madox Ford (Katharine Howard)
- Young Bess, Elizabeth, Captive Princess and Elizabeth and the Prince of Spain by Margaret Irwin
- Kenilworth by Sir Walter Scott (Elizabeth I and Amy Robsart)
- Cue for Treason by Geoffrey Trease (English Renaissance theatre/Elizabethan Cumberland and London)
- Come Rack! Come Rope! by Robert Hugh Benson (Elizabethan persecution of Catholics)
- Woodstock by Sir Walter Scott (English Civil War)
- Peveril of the Peak by Sir Walter Scott (English Civil War)
- John Inglesant by Joseph Henry Shorthouse (Charles I, English Civil War, Catholic proselytism)
- Lady of the Glen by Jennifer Roberson (Massacre of Glencoe)
- A Tale of Old Mortality by Sir Walter Scott (17th-century Scottish rebellion)
- A Journal of the Plague Year by Daniel Defoe (account of Great Plague of London, 1666)
- Year of Wonders by Geraldine Brooks (Great Plague, 1666)
- Forever Amber by Kathleen Winsor (17th century, Restoration period)
- Royal Escape by Georgette Heyer (Cromwell and Charles II)
- Micah Clarke by Sir Arthur Conan Doyle (17th century, Monmouth Rebellion)
- Captain Blood by Rafael Sabatini (17th century, Monmouth Rebellion and aftermath)
- The Baroque Cycle by Neal Stephenson (English Civil War, rule of Charles II, Glorious Revolution, early 18th century)
- Hawksmoor by Peter Akroyd (Christopher Wren, Nicholas Hawksmoor and parallel modern story)
- The History of Henry Esmond by William Makepeace Thackeray (reign of Queen Anne)
- An Instance of the Fingerpost by Iain Pears (Restoration period)

=== Hanoverian ===
- Rob Roy by Sir Walter Scott (1715 Jacobite rising)
- The Heart of Mid-Lothian by Sir Walter Scott (1730s Scotland and England)
- Waverley by Sir Walter Scott (1745 Jacobite rising)
- The Luck of Barry Lyndon by William Makepeace Thackeray (18th-century England, Seven Years' War)
- Redgauntlet by Sir Walter Scott (Jacobites in Dumfries, 1760s)
- Barnaby Rudge: A Tale of the Riots of 'Eighty by Charles Dickens (Gordon riots, 1780)
- A Tale of Two Cities by Charles Dickens (London and Paris during the French Revolution)
- Richard Sharpe series by Bernard Cornwell (British Army in the Napoleonic Wars)
- Horatio Hornblower series by C. S. Forester (British navy in the Napoleonic Wars)
- Aubrey–Maturin series by Patrick O'Brian (British Navy in the Napoleonic Wars)
- Ramage series by Dudley Pope (British Navy in the Napoleonic Wars)
- Bolitho Novels by Alexander Kent (British Navy in the Napoleonic Wars)
- Wellington and Napoleon Quartet by Simon Scarrow (Wellington and Napoleon)
- Judith by Brian Cleeve (the start of the 19th century)
- Kydd by Julian Stockwin (French and Napoleonic Wars)
- Sacred Hunger by Barry Unsworth (18th century transatlantic slave trade)

=== Victorian ===
- Fingersmith by Sarah Waters (1860s London and elsewhere)
- The Flashman Papers by George MacDonald Fraser (Victorian era)
- Laura Blundy by Julie Myerson (Victorian London)
- Jamrach's Menagerie by Carol Birch (Victorian London and seafaring)

=== 20th century ===
- The Wishing Game by Patrick Redmond (life in a strict and uncanny boarding school in rural Norfolk in the 1950s)
- The Rotters' Club by Jonathan Coe (1970s)
- Diary of an Ordinary Woman by Margaret Forster (a fictional diary of the period)

=== Multiple time frames ===
- Sarum by Edward Rutherfurd – Tells the story of England through the eyes of six families in the Salisbury area, stretching from Prehistoric Britain through the 1980s
- The Outlander series by Diana Gabaldon

== United States (including areas that become part of the US) ==
=== Colonial ===
- Rachel Dyer: a North American Story by John Neal (Salem witch trials)
- Logan, a Family History by John Neal (Aftermath of Lord Dunmore's War)
- Seventy-Six by John Neal (American Revolution)
- Brother Jonathan by John Neal (American Revolution)
- Sergeant Lamb of the Ninth and Proceed, Sergeant Lamb by Robert Graves (American Revolution)
- The Fort by Bernard Cornwell (the Penobscot Expedition of the American Revolution)
- The Last of the Mohicans by James Fenimore Cooper (French and Indian War)
- Richard Carvel by Winston Churchill (Maryland and the American Revolution)
- Shadow Patriots, a Novel of the Revolution by Lucia St. Clair Robson (George Washington's Culper Spy Ring)
- Johnny Tremain by Esther Forbes (Boston in the 1770s)
- Mason & Dixon by Thomas Pynchon (18th century/American Revolution)
- War Comes to Willy Freeman by James Lincoln Collier (American Revolution)

=== 19th century ===
- Burr by Gore Vidal (Aaron Burr)
- My Theodosia by Anya Seton (The life of Theodosia Burr Alston, her father Aaron Burr's Vice Presidency and subsequent years)
- The Confessions of Nat Turner by William Styron (1831 slave revolt)
- Roots: The Saga of an American Family by Alex Haley (18th–19th century slavery)
- Death Comes for the Archbishop by Willa Cather (mid-19th century New Mexico Territory
- Cloudsplitter by Russell Banks (abolitionist John Brown, pre-Civil War)
- The Emigrants series by Vilhelm Moberg (Swedish emigrants in Minnesota, 1850s)
- The Known World by Edward P. Jones (antebellum Virginia)
- The Travels of Jaimie McPheeters by Robert Lewis Taylor (mid-19th century Western wagon train)
- Lincoln by Gore Vidal
- Across Five Aprils by Irene Hunt (American Civil War)
- Andersonville by MacKinlay Kantor (American Civil War)
- Cold Mountain by Charles Frazier (American Civil War)
- Gone with the Wind by Margaret Mitchell (American Civil War)
- The Killer Angels by Michael Shaara (American Civil War)
- The Red Badge of Courage by Stephen Crane (American Civil War)
- Traveller by Richard Adams (American Civil War, told by Robert E. Lee's horse)
- Andersonville by MacKinlay Kantor (Andersonville prison camp)
- Shiloh by Shelby Foote
- The March by E. L. Doctorow (Sherman's March to the Sea)
- True Women by Janice Woods Windle (Texas Revolution, American Civil War, early 20th Century)
- Lee and Grant at Appomattox by MacKinlay Kantor (American Civil War)
- Oldest Living Confederate Widow Tells All by Allan Gurganus (American Civil War and late 19th century)
- Beloved by Toni Morrison (post-Civil War)
- Ride the Wind by Lucia St. Clair Robson (Cynthia Ann Parker's life with the Comanches)
- The Turquoise by Anya Seton (The Santa Fe Trail and New York society)
- Out of This Furnace by Thomas Bell (Immigrants and the steel mills of Pittsburgh, from 1880)
- Martin Dressler: The Tale of an American Dreamer by Steven Millhauser (late 19th century New York City)
- Shadow Country by Peter Matthiessen (Edgar "Bloody" Watson, late 19th century Florida)
- The City Beautiful by Aden Polydoros (Chicago 1893, World's Columbian Exposition)

=== 20th century ===
- Ragtime by E. L. Doctorow (beginning of the 20th century)
- The Road to Wellville by T. C. Boyle (the story of Dr. John Harvey Kellogg in 1907)
- Lanny Budd series by Upton Sinclair (1913–1949)
- Cryptonomicon by Neal Stephenson (American soldiers in World War II)
- Buckeye by Patrick Ryan (1940s to 1980s)

=== Multiple time frames ===
==== Novels by James A. Michener ====
- Alaska (Alaska)
- Centennial (Colorado)
- Chesapeake (Chesapeake Bay/Delmarva Peninsula)
- Hawaii (Hawaiʻi)
- Texas (Texas)

==== Novels by other authors ====
- New York by Edward Rutherfurd (New York City)
- A Council of Dolls by Mona Susan Power (Standing Rock Indian Reservation, South Dakota; Carlisle Indian Industrial School, Pennsylvania; Chicago, Illinois)

== Vietnam ==
- The Sorrow of War by Bao Ninh (Vietnam War)
- The Lotus Eaters by Tatjana Soli (Vietnam War)

== See also ==
- Historical fiction
- Historical novel
- Novel
- List of historical fiction by time period
- List of historical video games
- List of fiction set in ancient Rome
- List of fiction set in ancient Greece
