= Gyrfalcon (disambiguation) =

The gyrfalcon is the largest of the falcon species.

Gyrfalcon may also refer to:

- Gyrfalcon Islands, an uninhabited island group in the Qikiqtaaluk Region of Nunavut, Canada
- Gerfalcon (novel), a fantasy novel by Leslie Barringer
- Shenyang FC-31 «Gyrfalcon», a Chinese prototype fighter airplane
- EVS360 «White Gyrfalcon», a Russian high-speed train.
