= Spangle (novel) =

1987 novel by Gary Jennings

- Hardback Cover
- Author: Gary Jennings
- Language: English
- Genre: Historical novel
- Publisher: Atheneum Books
- Publication date: 1987
- Publication place: United States
- Media type: Print (Hardback)
- Pages: 869 pp
- ISBN: 0-689-11723-X
- OCLC: 14718906
- Dewey Decimal: 813/.54 19
- LC Class: PS3560.E518 S6 1987

Spangle is a historical novel written by Gary Jennings and first published in 1987.

== Plot introduction ==
After surrendering at Appomattox Court House in Virginia at the end of the American Civil War, two Confederate soldiers wander off and join Florian’s Flourishing Florilegium of Wonders, a traveling circus that has managed to continue performing throughout the war. Escaping from the coming Reconstruction of the South, the circus embarks for Europe where they meet many adventures as they travel throughout Europe between 1865 and 1871.

== Plot summary ==
Spangle is a historical novel written by Gary Jennings (1928–1999). Published in 1987, it follows a circus troupe known as "Florian's Flourishing Florilegium of Wonders" from the Confederate surrender at Appomattox to Europe, ending in France during the Franco-Prussian War. The book chronicles the rise of the troupe from a small "mud show" with few acts to the glittering toast of Paris, while delving into the evolving personal lives of its performers. The book is also an examination of the social structures of both post-Civil War America and Europe during a period in which the ancient system of monarchy was toppling. The main protagonist, other than the circus itself, is Zachary Edge, a former Confederate colonel embittered by war who accepts a position as the Florilegium's equestrian director. Edge's trials, both professional and personal, form the core of the plot, which details Edge's rise in the ranks of the circus in parallel to the rise of the Florilegium.

== Important Characters ==
=== Artistes ===
Name	Nom de Théâtre	Nationality	Occupation	Notes
Florian		Alsatian	Circus Owner/Governor
Ignatz Rooseboom	Captain Hotspur	Cape-Dutch	Lion tamer and rosinback rider.
Jacob Brady Russum	Tiny Tim Trimm	American	Dwarf, joey clown.
Lieutenant Colonel Zachary Edge	Colonel Ramrod, Buckskin Billy, Colonel Plantagenet-Tudor	Confederate	Equestrian Director, trick rider, and trick shooter.
Sergeant Obie Yount	The Quakemaker	Confederate	Strongman.
Magpie Maggie Hag		Spaniard	Fortune teller and seamstress.
Edith Coverley	Clover Lee	American	Rosinback trick rider.
Sarah Coverley	Madame Solitaire	American	Rosinback trick rider.	Mother of Clover Lee.
Jules Fontaine Rouleau	Monsieur Roulette	Cajun	Acrobat and aeronaut.
Hannibal Tyree	Abdullah the Hindu	Freed Slave	Juggler and Bull Man (Elephant trainer.)
Nellie Cubbidge	Autumn Auburn	English	Tightrope walker.
Corporal Foursquare John Fitzfarris	Sir John Doe	American	Tattooed man and sideshow director.
Abner Mullenax	Barnacle Bill	American	Pig trainer, lion tamer, and "Crocodile Man."
Phoebe Simms	Madame Alp	Freed Slave	Fat lady.	Mother of Sunday, Monday, Tuesday, and Quincy Simms.
Sunday Simms	Mademoiselle Butterfly	Freed Slave	"White African Pygmy," Trapeze artist.
Monday Simms	Cinderella	Freed Slave	"White African Pygmy," tightrope walker.
Tuesday Simms		Freed Slave	"White African Pygmy."
Quincy Simms	Ali Baba	Freed Slave	Contortionist.
Rosalie Brigid Mayo	Pepper	Irish	Perch pole artist and hair hang artist.
Cecile Makkai	Paprika	Hungarian	Perch pole artist and trapeze artist.
Kim Pok-tong		Korean	Antipodist.
Kim Tak-sung		Korean	Antipodist.
Kim Hak-su		Korean	Antipodist.
Pavlo Smodlaka		Serbian	Dog trainer.	Husband of Gavrila and father of Velja and Sava Smodlaka.
Gavrila Smodlaka		Serbian
Velja Smodlaka		Serbian	Albino.
Sava Smodlaka		Serbian	Albino.
Spyros Vasilakis	The Gluttonous Greek	Greek	Sword swallower and fire eater.	Husband of Meli Vasilakis.
Meli Vasilakis	Amazon maiden	Greek	Snake charmer.
Morris Levy	Maurice LeVie	French	Trapeze artist.
Giorgio Bonvecino	Zanni	Italian	Toby clown.
Jörg Pfeifer	Fünfünf		Whiteface clown.
Samuel Reindorf	Little Major Minim, Wimper	Polish	Dwarf and joey clown.
Shadid Sarkioglu	The Terrible Turk	Turkish	Strongman and velocipedist.
Agnete Knudsdatter	Miss Eel	Danish	Contortionist.
Nella Cornella			Emeraldina clown.
Bernhard Notkin			Hanswurst clown.
Ferdi Spenz			Kesperle clown.
Cecil Wheeler	The Wheeling Wheelers	British	Velocipedist and Plimpton skater.
Daphne Wheeler	The Wheeling Wheelers	British	Velocipedist and Plimpton skater.
Jean-François Pemjean	Le Démon Débonnaire, Pemjean l'Intrépide	French	Lion tamer.
Szábo Katalin	Cricket	Hungarian	Dwarf and "Enchanted Globe."
Jászi Arpád		Hungarian	Trick rider.
Jászi Zoltán		Hungarian	Trick rider.
Jászi Gustáv		Hungarian	Trick rider.
Timoféi Somov	Kostchei the Deathless	Russian	Scarred freak.
Princess Raisa Vasiliyevich Yusupova / "Olga Somova" (alias)	Brunhilde	Russian	Giant.
Giuseppina Bozzacchi	"The Music-Box Dancer"	Italian	Ballerina.

=== Notable Crew Members ===
Name	Alias	Nationality	Occupation	Notes
Dai Goesle	Stitches Goesle	Welsh	Canvasmaster.
Carl Beck	Boom-Boom Beck	Bavarian	Bandmaster, rigger, and calliope player.
Aleksander Banat		Slovak	Roustabout crew chief.
Baron Wilhelm Lothar Wittelsbach	Willie Lothar	Bavarian	Chefpublizist.
Gombocz Elemér		Hungarian	Cimbalom player.
Ioan Petrescu		Romanian	Seamstress.
Pierre Delattre		French	Plumber.

=== Menagerie ===
Name	Alias	Breed	Notes
Peggy	Brutus	Elephant.
Mitzi	Caesar	Elephant.
Maximus		Lion.
Thunder		Claybank quarter horse.	Main performance horse, and former cavalry mount, for Zachary Edge.
Lightning		Horse.	Former cavalry mount for Obie Yount.
Bubbles		Dapple gray horse.	Main performance horse for Clover Lee.
Snowball		White horse.	Main performance horse for Madame Solitaire.
Terry		Terrier.	One of three dogs used by the Smodlaka family.
Terrier		Terrier.	One of three dogs used by the Smodlaka family.
Terriest		Terrier.	One of three dogs used by the Smodlaka family.
Kewwy-Dee		Syrian bear.	Named due to Mullinax misunderstanding the phrase Q.E.D.
Kewwy-Dah		Syrian bear.
Raja		Bengal tiger.
Rani		Bengal tigress.
Siva		Bengal tigress.
Anwalt		Striped hyena.
Berater		Striped hyena.
Stars		Zebra.
Bars		Zebra.
Mustafa		Camel.
Rumpelstilzchen		South American dwarf horse.
		Auerhahn.
	Fafnir	Python.

== Release details ==
- 1987, USA, Atheneum Books (ISBN 0-689-11723-X)

Also released as a trilogy mass market paperback:

- 1999, USA, Forge Books The Road Show: Spangle #1 (ISBN 0812564715)
- 1999, USA, Forge Books The Center Ring: Spangle #2 (ISBN 0812564723)
- 1999, USA, Forge Books The Grand Promenade: Spangle #3 (ISBN 0812564731)

== See also ==
- historical fiction
- List of historical novelists
- List of historical novels
