= John Murrell (bandit) =

Antebellum American criminal (died 1844)

John A. Murrell
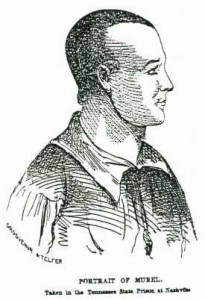
- John A. Murrell, with a boyish face, in the Tennessee State Penitentiary, Nashville, from the only known, accurate portrait, of Murrell, made during his lifetime.
- Born: c. 1806; Lunenburg County, Virginia, US
- Died: November 21, 1844 (aged 38); Pikeville, Tennessee, US
- Resting place: Smyrna Cemetery, Pikeville, Bledsoe County, Tennessee
- Other name: Great Western Land Pirate
- Occupations: Bandit, horse thief, slave stealer, burglar, camp meeting preacher, counterfeiter, river pirate, criminal gang leader, convict, carpenter, blacksmith
- Known for: Alleged, criminal mastermind behind the 1835 Murrell Slave Insurrection Conspiracy or "Murrell Excitement"
- Spouse: Elizabeth Mangham
- Children: 2

John Andrews Murrell (c. 1806 – November 21, 1844), known as "John A. Murrell", with his surname sometimes spelled as "Murel" or "Murrel", and called the "Great Western Land Pirate", was a 19th-century bandit and criminal operating along the Natchez Trace and Mississippi River in the southern United States. His exploits were widely known at the time, and he became a noted figure in 20th-century fiction.

He was first convicted as a youth of horse theft. He was branded with an "HT", flogged, and sentenced to six years in prison. He was released in 1829. Murrell was convicted the second and last time for the crime of slave stealing in the Circuit Court of Madison County, Tennessee. He was incarcerated in the Tennessee State Penitentiary in Nashville from 1834 to 1844.

== Early life ==
According to Tennessee prison records, John Andrews Murrell was born in Lunenburg County, Virginia, and raised in Williamson County, Tennessee. Murrell was the son of Jeffrey Murrell and Zilpha Andrews, and was the third born of eight children. While he was incarcerated in Nashville for slave stealing, his mother, wife, and two children lived in the vicinity of Denmark, Tennessee.

== Punishment and imprisonment ==
John A. Murrell had his first criminal conviction for horse theft as a teenager, and was subsequently branded on the base of his thumb with an "HT" for horse thief, flogged, and sentenced to six years in prison. He was released in 1829. Murrell was convicted a second and final time for the crime of slave stealing in the Circuit Court of Madison County, Tennessee, and incarcerated in the Tennessee State Penitentiary in Nashville from 1834 to 1844. While in the Tennessee State Penitentiary, Murrell, as part of his reform, was required to work as a blacksmith. A decade in prison under the Auburn penitentiary system, with mandatory convict regimentation, through prison uniforms, lockstep, silence, and occasional solitary confinement, was said to have broken Murrell mentally and supposedly left him an imbecile. He spent the last months of his life as a blacksmith in Pikeville, Tennessee.

The Nashville Daily American newspaper reported a different account of his last year of life. It said that when Murrell was released from prison at 38, he became a reformed man and a Methodist in good standing. He worked as a carpenter by trade, and lived at a boarding house in Pikeville.

== Death ==
In a deathbed confession, Murrell admitted to being guilty of most of the crimes charged against him except murder, to which he claimed to be "guiltless". John A. Murrell died on November 21, 1844, nine months after leaving prison. He was reported to have contracted "pulmonary consumption" (tuberculosis). Murrell was interred at Smyrna Cemetery in Pikeville, Tennessee. After Murrell died, parts of him were dug up and stolen by grave robbers. Although the corpse had been half-eaten by scavenging hogs, the head was separated from the torso, pickled, and displayed at county fairs. His skull is missing, but the Tennessee State Museum holds one of his thumbs.

== Accepted claims ==
Accepted facts about his life include stealing horses, for which he was branded. He was also caught with a freed slave living on his property. Murrell was known to kidnap slaves and sell them to other slave owners. His 10-year prison sentence was for slave-stealing. Murrell would be considered a conductor on the Reverse Underground Railroad. He is also suspected to have been involved in counterfeiting in Arkansas His claims of being part of a "Mystic Clan" resulted in over 50 white men and a number of African Americans to be either hanged or whipped and banished in Western Mississippi.

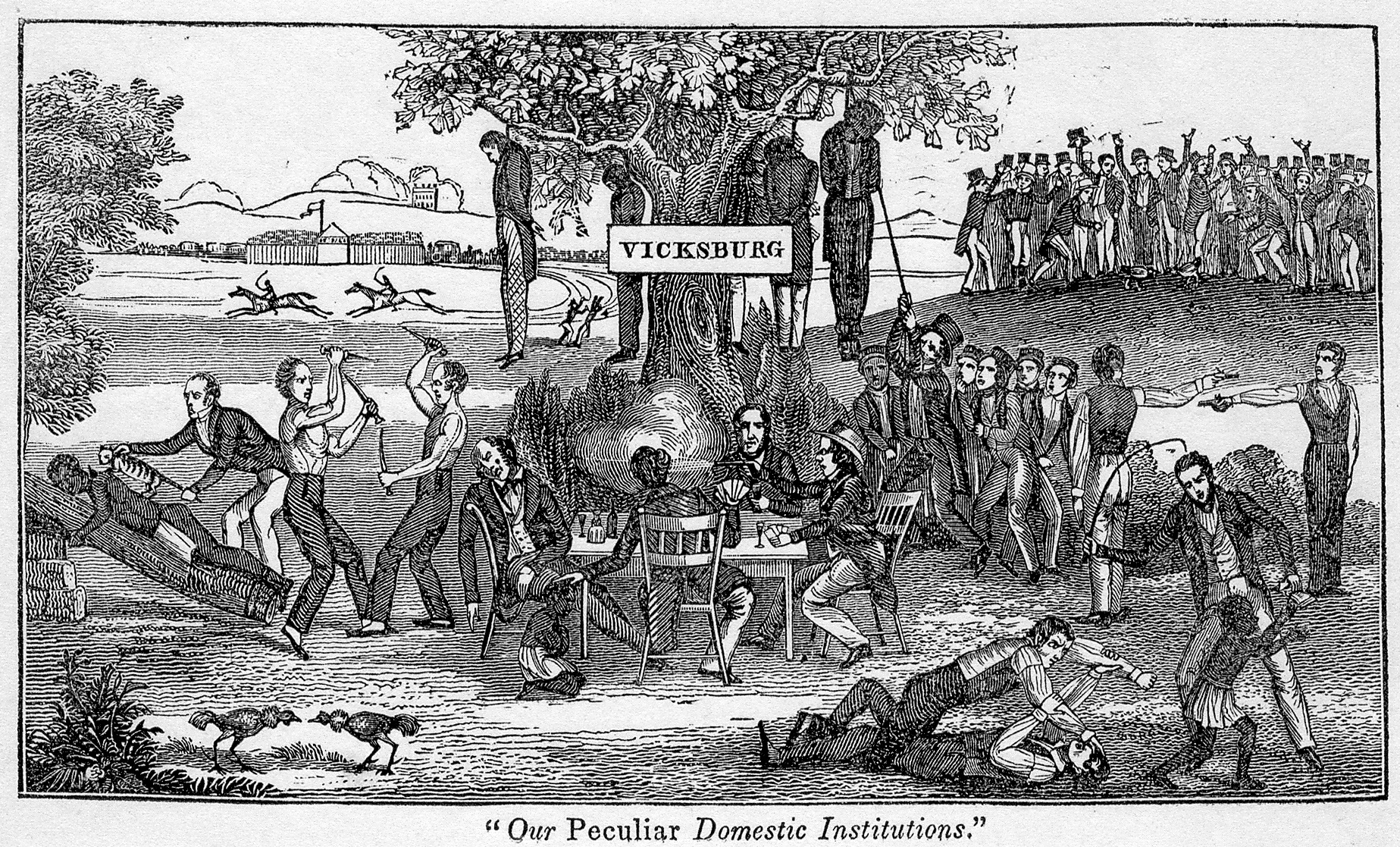
The hanging of five gamblers in Vicksburg, Mississippi in 1835 was in response to the rising regulator activity against criminals in the region following the arrest of Murrell known as the "Murrell Excitement"

=== "The Murrell Excitement" ===
In 1835, Virgil Stewart wrote that a slave rebellion was being organized by highwaymen and Northern abolitionists. On Christmas Day, 1835, Murrell and his "Mystic Clan" planned to incite an uprising in every slaveholding state by invoking the Haitian Revolution, the most successful slave rebellion in history. Murrell believed that a slave rebellion would enable him to take over the South, and make New Orleans the center of operations of his criminal empire.

No known accurate portrait of John A. Murrell in his later years exists. This is an artist's interpretation of his older physical appearance found in historical records.

Stewart's account of his interactions with Murrell was published as a pamphlet, written under the pseudonym "Augustus Q. Walton, Esq.," for whom Stewart invented a fictitious background and profession. The validity of the pamphlet has been debated since its publication. Some historians say that Stewart's pamphlet was largely fictional and that Murrell (and his brothers) were at best inept thieves, who had caused their father to go bankrupt as he raised bail money for them.

Given Nat Turner's slave rebellion in 1831 in Virginia, slaveholders were always ready to believe conspiracies of new violence, especially in the Deep South where whites were far outnumbered by blacks. Those aroused by the pamphlet became part of increasing tensions and outbreaks known as the "Murrell Excitement". During this time, tension between the races and between locals and outsiders increased. On July 4, 1835, disturbances occurred in the red-light districts of Nashville and Memphis, Tennessee, and Natchez, Mississippi. 20 slaves and 10 white men were hanged after confessing (under torture and coercion) to complicity in Murrell's plot.

On July 6 in Vicksburg, Mississippi, an angry mob decided to expel all professional gamblers from the town, based on a rumor that gamblers were part of the plot. When the gamblers resisted, the mob lynched five of them by hanging. Similar panic surrounding Murrell and his conspiracy spread throughout the South long after his death, with cities from Huntsville, Alabama, to New Orleans, Louisiana, creating committees dedicated to identifying Murrell's conspirators and potential signs of slave rebellion.

== Disputed claims ==
Mystic Clan (Mystic Confederacy)
- Founded by: John A. Murrell
- Years active: 1830s
- Territory: Southern United States
- Ethnicity: European-American
- Membership (est.): Alleged members: Approximately 400 in Grand Council (Southern states representatives) Up to 650 strikers (soldiers)
- Criminal activities: House burglary, slave stealing, horse theft, cattle theft, highway robbery, counterfeiting, murder, slave insurrection

Murrell was known as a "land-pirate", using the Mississippi River as a base for his operations. He used a network of 300 to 1,000, and even as many as 2,500 (as some newspaper reports claimed) fellow bandits collectively known as the Mystic Clan to pull off his escapades. Many of his followers were believed to be members of mixed-race groups known as the Melungeons and Redbones. He was also known as a bushwhacker along the Natchez Trace.

Murrell posed as a traveling preacher. Twain and others wrote that he would preach to a congregation while his gang stole the horses outside, but they also said that Murrell's horse was always left behind. The location of his hideout and operations base has been debated. Possibilities were Jackson County, Tennessee; Natchez, Mississippi, at Devil's Punch Bowl; Tunica County, Mississippi; the Neutral Ground in Louisiana; and Island 37 on the Mississippi River. One record, a genealogical note, places him as far east as Georgia. Atlanta historian Franklin Garrett wrote that a lawless district in that town was named for him in the 1840s, as "Murrell's Row". Because Murrell came to symbolize lawlessness along the Natchez Trace in the antebellum era, his "hideouts" (whether any hideouts existed or not) were said to be located at most of the well-known areas of such lawlessness along the Trace.

Stewart published his account of Murrell's plot in 1835. Just before Murrell was apprehended, he was rumored to be leading a slave revolt in New Orleans in an attempt to take over the city and become a sort of criminal potentate of Louisiana. Some say he began to plot his takeover of New Orleans in 1841, although he was then in the sixth year of a 10-year sentence in the prison at Nashville. Others say he operated as a criminal from 1835 to 1857. He was in prison for 10 of those years and died of tuberculosis in 1844 shortly after being released.

A stream in Chicot County, Arkansas, called Whiskey Chute, was named in 1855 for Murrell's raid on a whiskey-carrying steamboat that was sunk after it was pillaged. From Record Group 25, "Prison Records for the Main Prison at Nashville, Tennessee, 1831-1922," Murrell was born in 1806, most likely in Williamson County, Tennessee.

== In popular culture ==
- In "Life on the Mississippi" (Chapter 29), Mark Twain gives an inflated and gory account of the various crimes of Murrell (his spelling "Murel") and attributes his capture and conviction to a Mr. Stewart.
- In The Adventures of Tom Sawyer, Injun Joe and his accomplice find a treasure which they believe to be spoils from Murrell's robberies. Tom Sawyer and Huckleberry Finn claim it in the end.
- In Jibby Jones by Ellis Parker Butler, a group of boys search for Murrell's treasure near the Mississippi in Iowa.
- Jorge Luis Borges referred to him in his fictional story, "The Cruel Redeemer Lazarus Morell", written between 1933 and 1934 and published in A Universal History of Iniquity in 1935.
- Murrell was a fictional character in the movie Virginia City (1940), in which he was played by Humphrey Bogart as the leader of a gang of "banditos" during the American Civil War of the early 1860s. (This was after his historic time.)
- Eudora Welty featured a highwayman named James Murrell in her short story "A Still Moment", collected in The Wide Net and Other Stories (1943).
- Robert Lewis Taylor referred to him as a fictional character in his novel The Travels of Jamie McPheeters. Murrell also appeared in the 1963 television show based on the book, and was portrayed by James Westerfield.
- Gary Jennings used him as a fictional character in his novel Sow the Seeds of Hemp (1976).
- Murrell's purported treasure figures in the Aaron and Adam Nee film Band of Robbers (2015), loosely based on Mark Twain's The Adventures of Tom Sawyer and Adventures of Huckleberry Finn.
- William Faulkner mentions Murrell in his story "The Courthouse".
- Harry Harrison Kroll referred to Murrell as a figure in his novel Rogue's Company (1943).

== See also ==
- John Crenshaw
- James Ford (pirate)
