= Shy Leopardess =

1948 fantasy novel by Leslie Barringer

- First edition
- Author: Leslie Barringer
- Cover artist: Jack Matthew
- Language: English
- Series: Neustrian Cycle
- Genre: Historical fantasy
- Publisher: Methuen and Co. Ltd.
- Publication date: 1948
- Publication place: United Kingdom
- Media type: Print (Hardback)
- Pages: vii, 392 pp
- Preceded by: Joris of the Rock (1928)
- Followed by: none

Shy Leopardess is a fantasy novel by Leslie Barringer, the third and last book in his three volume Neustrian Cycle. The book was first published in the United Kingdom by Methuen in 1948. Its significance was recognized by its republication in the United States by the Newcastle Publishing Company as the thirteenth volume of the Newcastle Forgotten Fantasy Library series in October, 1977. The Newcastle edition was reprinted by Borgo Press in 1980.

== Plot ==
The novel is set around the 14th century in an alternate medieval France called Neustria (historically an early division of the Frankish kingdom). Yolande, whose estate has been wrested from her by her forced marriage to the depraved Balthasar, schemes to recover her independence with the aid of her admirers, Diomede and Lioncel.

== Contents ==
Chapter headings of the 1948 edition:

1. Encounters at Parledin.
2. Azo's way.
3. Roclatour and Sanctlamine.
4. A silver shield and a grey kitten.
5. Balthasar's way.
6. Jehane's way.
7. The way of Dom Ursus Campestris.
8. Belphegor's way.
9. The secret servants of Yolande.
10. Passing bells at Roclatour.
11. Fruit of thunder.
12. Belphagor's way again.
13. "My Diomede, my Lioncel".
14. Yolande's way.
15. A queen from the east.

== Reception ==
John Clute, in his evaluation of the Neustrian Cycle, notes that "Of the three protagonists, Yolande of Baraine – the Shy Leopardess of the third novel – is perhaps the most interesting, as she successfully gambles her life (her "virtue" does not last the course) to gain autonomy in a male-dominated world."

Lin Carter cited the first American edition of 1977 from Newcastle, as one of that year's best fantasy books.
