= Murrell's Row =

Human settlement in Atlanta, Georgia, United States of America

Coordinates: 33.7542°N 84.3893°W

Murrell's Row was a red-light district of Atlanta in the mid 19th century "starting at the juncture of Line, Decatur and Peachtree streets" (i.e., at today's Five Points "and running back towards Pryor on Decatur street". According to Archival Atlanta:

Named for the notorious Tennessee murderer, John A. Murrell, this section of town was a favorite hangout for thieves, gamblers, cutthroats, and prostitutes. Drunken brawls and cockfights were common and expected here. Before the Civil War, Murrell's Row was the preferred meeting place for those who wanted to fight and concoct schemes. This notorious area north of Decatur Street between Peachtree and Pryor faded away shortly before the Civil War.

== External resources ==
- Pecanne Log (blog), "Breaking News: Atlanta's Seedy Past"
