= Sow the Seeds of Hemp =

1976 novel by Gary Jennings

- Author: Gary Jennings
- Language: English
- Genre: Fiction
- Published: 1976
- Publication place: USA
- Pages: 288
- ISBN: 9780393335705

Sow the Seeds of Hemp is a 1976 novel by Gary Jennings. It tells the story of two men, Virgil Stewart and John Murrell, both former members of the same outlaw gang, as one risks his life to bring the other to justice.

== Reception ==
Kirkus Reviews considered it to be "(a) true story as authentic as a hanging", but less funny than Jennings' earlier novel The Terrible Teague Bunch.

The New York Times called it "entertaining"; however, People noted that it "flopped".
