= The Journeyer =

1984 novel by Gary Jennings

- First edition
- Author: Gary Jennings
- Language: English
- Genre: Historical novel
- Publisher: Atheneum Books (US); Hutchinson (UK)
- Publication date: 1984
- Publication place: United States
- Media type: Print (Hardback & Paperback)
- Pages: 782 pp
- ISBN: 978-0-689-11403-8
- OCLC: 9829504
- Dewey Decimal: 813/.54 19
- LC Class: PS3560.E518 J6 1984

The Journeyer is a historical novel about Marco Polo, written by Gary Jennings and first published in 1984.

== Plot introduction ==
Marco is the only heir to the wealthy Polo family of Venice. Unsupervised, he freely roams the streets and canals of the city getting in trouble. When he is falsely accused of murdering the husband of his lover, he is exiled from Venice and travels east with his father and uncle to the court of Kublai Khan, Mongol emperor of the orient. Marco remains in the empire for nearly twenty years and returns home as a wealthy man. His adventures become legendary.

== Plot summary ==
Marco Polo is the last of the illustrious Polo family left in Venice, after his father and uncles moved abroad, leaving him and his mother behind. His mother dies when he is seven, and he becomes increasingly unruly as he is raised by family servants like Zia Zulia, and their black slave Michiel. Marco becomes friends with Venice's "boat children", a group of orphans who live on the canals of Venice, and becomes particularly close to Ubaldo and his sister Doris. Marco becomes even more uncontrollable when Zia Zulia and Michiel are caught sleeping together and subsequently run away.

== Characters ==
- Marco Polo – protagonist and narrator: a Venetian merchant who travels east to China and becomes a courtier in the Mongol court of Kubilai Khan.
- Nicolò Polo – Marco's father. He loves to speak in parables.
- Mafìo Polo – Marco's uncle. Marco learns of his uncle's homosexuality and is disgusted by it. Mafìo shares a potion with his lover Achmed and goes mad as a result. He spends the rest of his life an invalid.
- Kubilai Khan – The Khan of all Khans. He admires the Han culture. Soon after the Polos arrive in his capital, Kubilai takes a liking to young Marco and shows him favor.
- Nostril – Marco's slave bought for him by his father to keep an eye on Marco while the elder Polos left him behind in Baghdad. Nostril is a Sind and has had many other names such as Sindbad, Ali Babar and Ali-ad-Din. He is later given his freedom by Marco and marries the former Turki princess Mar-Janar.
- Hui-Sheng – "Echo" Marco Polo's Min lover and consort. She is a deaf-mute who dies in childbirth.
- Doris – one of the “boat children,” the poor orphans of the Venice docks. Marco befriends Doris and her brother Ubaldo. Before he leaves for his journey, Marco and Doris make love. Marco later marries her daughter who is half his age when he finally returns to Venice 20 years after leaving.
- Princess Moth – The Crown Princess or Shahzrad Magas, daughter of Shahinshah Zaman and Shahryar Zahd of Baghdad. She introduces Marco to many of the Persian pleasures of the bedroom.
- Mordecai Cartafilo – A Jewish merchant of Venice; he meets Marco in prison and escapes with Marco's help. For that good deed (mitzvah), Marco receives help from other Jewish people all throughout his travels. The text hints heavily that these men, who all have a similar appearance, are Tzadikim Nistarim.

== Release details ==
- 1984, USA, Atheneum Books (ISBN 978-0689114038
- 1984, UK, Hutchinson (ISBN 978-0091586508)
- 2006, USA, Forge Books/Tom Doherty Associates (ISBN 978-0765349644)

== See also ==
- Historical fiction
- List of historical novelists
- List of historical novels
