= The Rose in Splendour =

1953 novel by Leslie Barringer

The Rose in Splendour: A Story of the Wars of Lancaster and York
- First edition
- Author: Leslie Barringer
- Illustrator: Alan Blyth
- Language: English
- Series: Pageant books series
- Genre: Historical novel
- Publisher: Phoenix House
- Publication date: 1953
- Publication place: United Kingdom
- Media type: Print (hardback)
- Pages: 160

The Rose in Splendour: A Story of the Wars of Lancaster and York is a historical novel by Leslie Barringer. It was first published by Phoenix House in 1953.

== Plot ==
The novel is set in England over a period of eighteen months in the years 1460-61 during the internal war generally known as the Wars of the Roses between the House of Lancaster and the House of York. It tells the tale of a young boy's early life, leaving his family’s farm first to an apprenticeship in York and later getting caught up in the bloody and decisive victory for the Yorkists at the Battle of Towton (29 March (Palm Sunday) 1461).
