= Joris of the Rock =

1928 book by Leslie Barringer

- First edition dust cover
- Author: Leslie Barringer
- Language: English
- Series: Neustrian Cycle
- Genre: Historical fantasy novel
- Publisher: William Heinemann
- Publication date: 1928
- Publication place: United Kingdom
- Media type: Print (Hardback)
- Pages: 325 pp
- Preceded by: Gerfalcon (1927)
- Followed by: Shy Leopardess (1948)

Joris of the Rock is a fantasy novel by Leslie Barringer, the second book in his three volume Neustrian Cycle. The book was first published in the United Kingdom by Heinemann in 1928; an American edition followed from Doubleday in 1929. Its significance was recognized by its republication by the Newcastle Publishing Company as the ninth volume of the celebrated Newcastle Forgotten Fantasy Library series in September, 1976. The Newcastle edition was reprinted by Borgo Press in 1980 and 2010.

== Plot ==
The novel is set around the fourteenth century in an alternate medieval France called Neustria (historically an early division of the Frankish kingdom). Overlapping the events of the previous novel, Gerfalcon, it follows the fortunes of roguish protagonist Joris, his paramour, Red Anne, and Joris's illegitimate son Juhel.

== Reception ==
A review in the Manchester Guardian characterized Joris of the Rock as a "period novel" in contrast to a historical one, and called it "a robust, a teaming book," "a tensely plotted tale which marches at swinging pace to bear witness to its author's rich inventiveness."

== Sources ==
- Reginald, Robert. Xenograffiti: essays on fantastic literature. (2005 second edition), I. O. Evans Studies in the Philosophy and Criticism of Literature, number 33 Borgo Press ISSN 0271-9061
- De Camp, L. Sprague. Literary Swordsmen and Sorcerers: the Makers of Heroic Fantasy. Arkham House, 1976.
- Carter, Lin. Imaginary Worlds: the Art of Fantasy. Ballantine Books, 1973.
