= Kydd (novel) =

2001 novel by Julian Stockwin

Kydd (a novel)
- UK first edition cover
- Author: Julian Stockwin
- Language: English
- Series: Thomas Kydd series
- Genre: Historical novel
- Publisher: Hodder & Stoughton
- Publication date: April 2001
- Publication place: United Kingdom
- Media type: Print (Hardcover and Paperback) and audio-CD and E-books
- Pages: 352 pp (hardcover edition)); 352 pp (paperback edition)
- ISBN: 0-340-79473-9 (hardcover edition); ISBN 0-340-77087-2 (paperback edition)
- OCLC: 45349764

Kydd, first published in 2001, is a historical novel by Julian Stockwin. This first instalment in Stockwin's series of novels set during the Age of Fighting Sail tells the story of Thomas Kydd, who is pressed into service on a British ship in 1793. The book is unusual in that the hero is an ordinary pressed man, not an officer as is most common in nautical fiction.

== Plot introduction ==
The story: The year is 1793. Europe is ablaze with war. The Prime Minister, William Pitt the Elder, is under pressure to make an active move at sea from the highest authority in the realm; George III had appointed Pitt as Lord Warden of the Cinque Ports, a position whose incumbent was responsible for the coastal defences of the nation. In response to the pressure, despatches a squadron to appear off the French coast. To man the ships, ordinary people must be press-ganged. Thomas Paine Kydd, a young wig-maker from Guildford, is seized, taken across the country to Sheerness and the great fleet anchorage of the Nore to be part of the crew of the fictional 98-gun line-of-battle ship Duke William.

The ship sails immediately and Kydd quickly has to learn the harsh realities of shipboard life fast; but despite all that he goes through in danger of tempest and battle he comes to admire the skills and courage of the seamen — taking up the challenge himself to become a true sailor.

== Publication details ==
- 2001, UK, Hodder & Stoughton ISBN 0-340-79473-9, Publication Date 5 April 2001, HB
- 2001, USA, Simon & Schuster ISBN 0-7432-1458-7, Publication Date 25 June 2001, HB
- 2001, UK, Hodder & Stoughton ISBN 1-84032-411-2, Publication Date 5 April 2001, Audio Cassette (reading)
- 2002, UK, Hodder & Stoughton ISBN 0-340-83781-0, Publication Date 11 October 2004, PB
- 2002, USA, Simon & Schuster ISBN 0-7432-1459-5, Publication Date 1 August 2002, PB
