= Gerfalcon (novel) =

1927 fantasy novel by Leslie Barringer

- First edition
- Author: Leslie Barringer
- Language: English
- Series: Neustrian Cycle
- Genre: Historical Fantasy novel
- Publisher: William Heinemann Ltd
- Publication date: 1927
- Publication place: United Kingdom
- Media type: Print (Hardback)
- Pages: 315 pp
- Followed by: Joris of the Rock (1928)

Gerfalcon is a fantasy novel by Leslie Barringer, the first book in his three volume Neustrian Cycle. The book was first published in 1927 by Heinemann in the United Kingdom and Doubleday in the United States. Its significance was recognized by its republication in 1973 by Tom Stacey in the UK and in March, 1976 by the Newcastle Publishing Company in the US, as the seventh volume of its celebrated Newcastle Forgotten Fantasy Library series. This Newcastle edition was reprinted twice, once by Newcastle itself in 1977 and once by Borgo Press in 1980.

== Plot ==
The novel is set around the fourteenth century in an alternate medieval France called Neustria (historically an early division of the Frankish kingdom). Raoul, the young heir to the barony of Marckmont (described as "a blend of elf and owl and boy") grows up to become a sensitive, intelligent young man who prefers reading and song to the so-called knightly virtues of war and slaughter. At seventeen, he takes off on his own and thus begin a series of adventures that will both test and mature him. Along the way, he falls in love, survives attempted murder, saves Red Anne (Mistress of the Witches' Coven of the Singing Stones), and is forced to join the household of the brigand Count Lorin de Campscapel, Red Anne's lover. Raoul's life at the Campscapel's castle is one of constant danger. Only after many more thrilling incidents does he finally comes into his inheritance.

== Contents ==
Chapter headings of the 1927 edition:

1. Shadows at Sanctbastre.
2. Tourney at Belsaunt.
3. The moors of Nordenay.
4. The Singing Stones of Hastain.
5. The hold above Alanol.
6. Face Campscapel face death.
7. The forest of Honoy.
8. Parley at Montenair.
9. Assay towards Saulte.
10. Street of Anvils.
11. A viscount comes home.
12. Raoul's day.
13. The marshes of Marckmont.
14. The crags of Ger.

== Reception ==
The Illustrated London News called the book "a moving story, faultlessly treated" and "a mediæval romance strongly to be recommended" which "[t]he spirit of the Middle Ages moves through."
