= Barbara Corrado Pope =

American novelist and professor

Barbara Corrado Pope Professor emerita
- Born: 1941 (age 84–85); Cleveland, Ohio, USA
- Occupations: Faculty, novelist
- Known for: Founding director of Women's and Gender Studies, University of Oregon; Director, Robert D. Clark Honors College
- Title: Professor
- Spouse: Daniel Pope
- Children: One adult daughter, a legal aid criminal defense attorney in New York City

Academic background
- Education: Ph.D.
- Alma mater: Columbia University
- Thesis: Mothers and daughters in early nineteenth-century Paris (1981)

Academic work
- Era: French Revolution–Belle Époque
- Discipline: Historian
- Sub-discipline: Women's studies
- Institutions: University of Oregon
- Notable works: Cézanne's Quarry; The Blood of Lorraine; The Missing Italian Girl
- Website: http://www.barbaracpope.com/

Barbara Corrado Pope, professor emerita, (born 1941) is a novelist, historian, a former director of Clark Honors College at the University of Oregon, and the founding director of Women's and Gender Studies at Oregon.

== Biography ==
A native of Cleveland, Ohio, Pope earned a Ph.D. in the Social and Intellectual History of Europe at Columbia University. She has taught history and women's studies in Hungary, Italy, France, the University of New Mexico, and Harvard Divinity School. At the University of Oregon, she was the founding director of women's studies, which was approved first as a certificate program in 1973, approved as an academic major in 1997, and became a department of the University in 2009. She has also been the director of Robert D. Clark Honors College at Oregon.

== Research and teaching ==
Pope's 1981 Ph.D. dissertation at Columbia University was entitled, Mothers and daughters in early nineteenth-century Paris. As a post-doctoral fellow at Harvard Divinity School in 1981–1982, Pope researched "the meaning and public role of female symbols and saints in religious conflict and the socio-political context of 19th and 20th century France, with particular concern for their implications for models of womanhood".

Pope has written a number of pioneering articles on women's and religious history, including "Angels in the Devil's Workshop: Leisured and Charitable Women in Nineteenth-Century France and England", and "Immaculate and Powerful: The Marian Revival in the Nineteenth Century". She was also a consultant and co-scriptwriter on a documentary film about a Sicilian Easter Procession, Processione (1989).

Pope's teaching career at the University of Oregon brought recognition and awards: In 1988 she received the University's Burlington Northern Foundation award for excellence in teaching. The Center for the Study of Women in Society described her contributions to the undergraduate curriculum:

Pope was the driving force behind the 1987 UO curriculum shift that required students to take a course focused on race and gender. Because of her determined efforts to win innovative curriculum reform, she was the first woman to win the Charles E. Johnson Memorial Award for "exceptional service to the university and the community" in 1991. Pope also received a Ford Foundation grant that helped her and colleagues develop a two-year seminar that contributed to women of color and multicultural curriculum throughout the country.

The annual Barbara Corrado Pope Award was established at the Clark Honors College for an honors thesis "in the area of diversity, including gender and ethnic studies".

== Novels ==
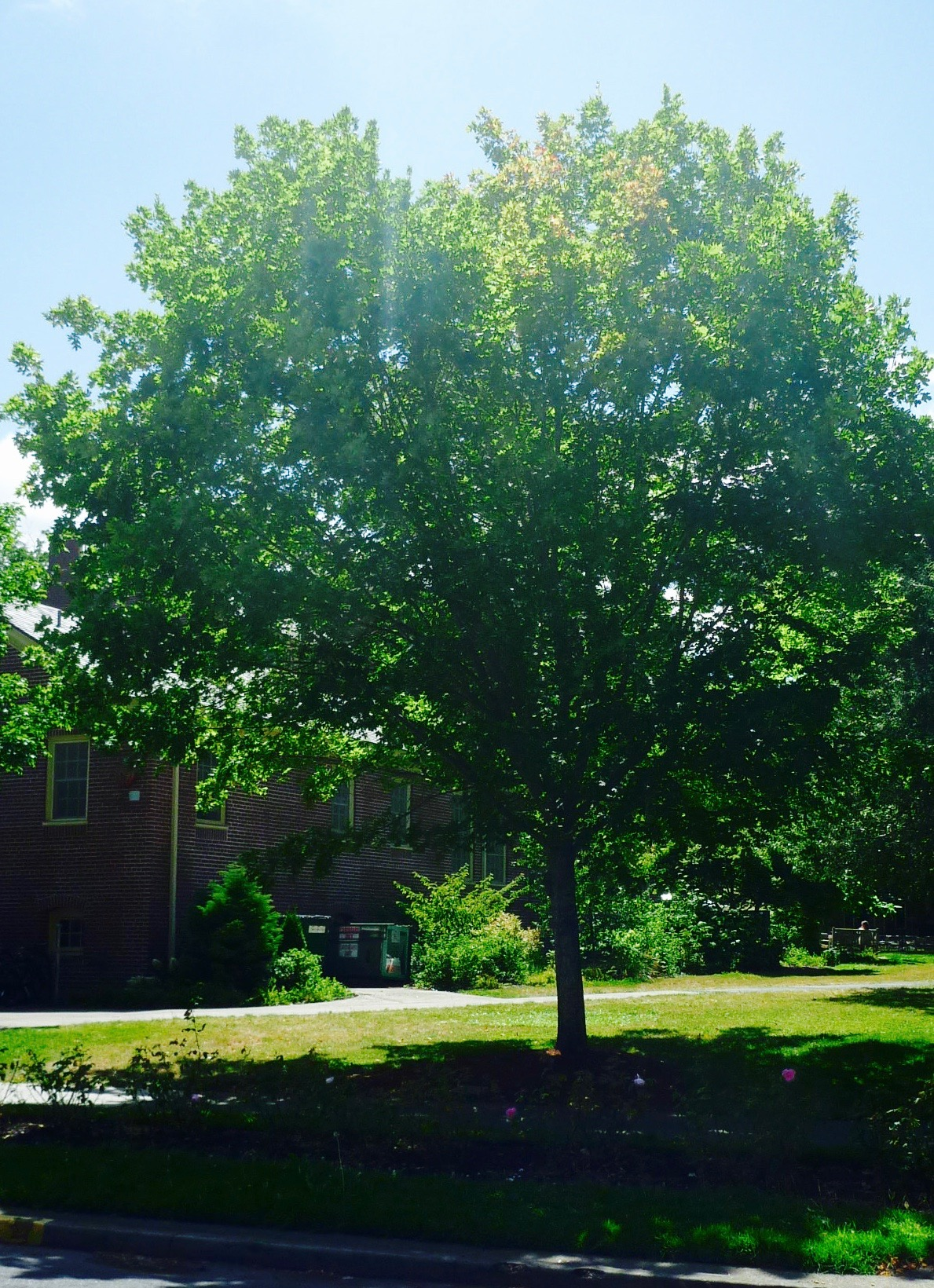
Commemorative sugar maple tree

Since retiring in 2008, Pope has written a trilogy of murder mysteries set in France during the period between the Franco-Prussian War and World War I. She has published Cézanne's Quarry (New York: Pegasus Books, 2008); The Blood of Lorraine (New York: Pegasus Books, 2010); and The Missing Italian Girl (New York: Pegasus Books, 2013). She is working on a fourth novel, set in Cleveland, Ohio, and is writing short plays.

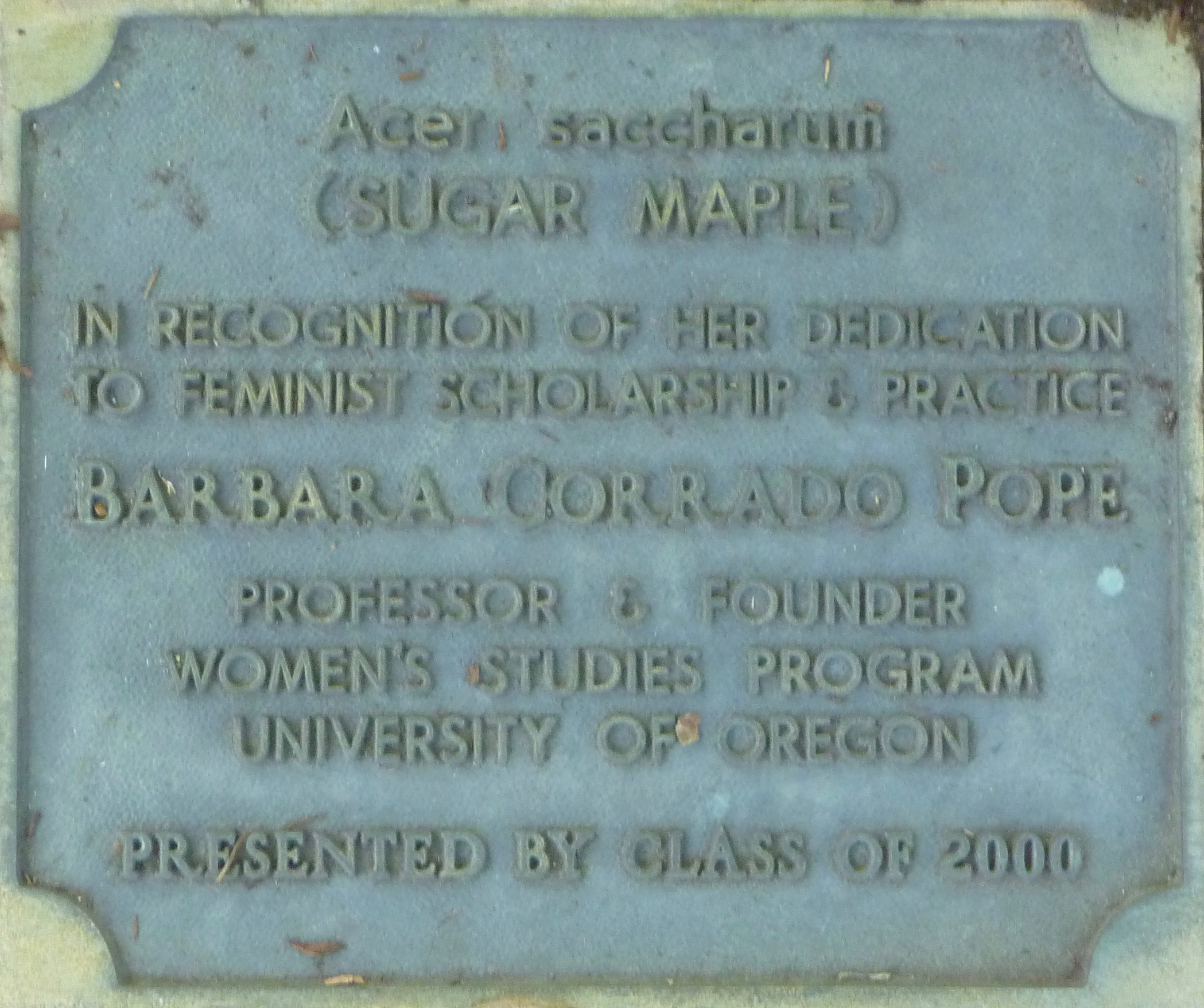
Commemorative plaque from Class of 2000

== Critical reception ==
Pope's fiction has been well received. Charles Sowerwine noted, "She is producing historical crime novels set in late 19th-century France, the culture to which she has devoted her life. She has added to our store of enjoyable works that teach about life in that culture." He concluded, "Perhaps it is not fair to judge these novels as mysteries. While the plots of the three books certainly involve classic mystery devices—obvious suspects, red herrings, false clues, and unexpected perpetrators—Pope clearly wants more than to be the Third Republic's Fred Vargas; she wants to present a broad view of French society through a fictional setting."

Hallie Ephron wrote that Pope's "wonderful mysteries are steeped in history and twisted by her own uniquely subversive viewpoint", and observed, "Pope starts each book with an historical moment which offers a context for exploring issues of class, gender and social justice", noting finally that Pope writes "... as if there's a cheeky (not preachy) broad at the keyboard, not afraid to call it the way she sees it".

Reviewer Julie Hammons, one of Pope's former students at the University of New Mexico, said there she had "learned to read fiction through the lens of women's experiences and began listening to the voices of women in contemporary politics and culture". Further, Hammons sees the influence of Pope's work as a feminist scholar in her fiction efforts.

Oprah.com featured The Missing Italian Girl as a Summer Reading recommendation in 2013, as "one of 7 Compulsively Readable Mysteries (for the Crazy-Smart Reader)!"

== See also ==
- Belle Époque
- Gender studies
- Women's studies
