= Know Ye Not Agincourt? =

Book by Leslie Barringer

- First edition
- Author: Leslie Barringer
- Illustrator: C. Walter Hodges
- Language: English
- Series: The Nelsonian Library No. 37
- Genre: Historical novel
- Publisher: Thomas Nelson and Sons
- Publication date: 1936
- Publication place: United Kingdom
- Media type: Print (Hardback)
- Pages: 213 + ix

Know Ye Not Agincourt? is a historical novel by Leslie Barringer, first published by Nelson in 1936. Kathleen Mathers, writing in The Province, characterized the novel as an "adventure tale".

== Plot ==
The novel is set in fifteenth century England and France. It concerns the adventures of an English squire and his friends, their taking part in the month-long Siege of Harfleur and the Battle of Agincourt, and its bitter consequences for all of them. It ends with a brief and unknowing meeting with the young Joan of Arc.

Although written for younger readers, it exhibits some of the high literary quality of the Neustrian trilogy.

== Contents ==
Chapter headings of the 1936 edition:

1. In the Valley of Mallerstang.
2. Silver Stars and a Golden Claw.
3. The Two Faces of Ingleram Todd.
4. The Mustering of the Army.
5. Two Sides of the Narrow Seas.
6. The Striding of St. George.
7. St. Crispin's Day at Agincourt.
8. Soldiers garlanded with fame.
9. Two French Ladybirds.
10. Round about a Loathly Ditch.
11. In the Marshes of Lorraine.
