= Aztec (novel) =

1980 novel by Gary Jennings

- First edition cover
- Author: Gary Jennings
- Language: English
- Genre: Historical fiction
- Publisher: Atheneum
- Publication date: 1980
- Publication place: United States
- Media type: Print (hardbound)
- Pages: 754
- ISBN: 0-689-11045-6
- OCLC: 6881009
- Dewey Decimal: 813/.54 19
- LC Class: PS3560.E518 A99 1980
- Followed by: Aztec Autumn

Aztec is a 1980 historical fiction novel by American author Gary Jennings. It is the first of two novels Jennings wrote in the Aztec series, followed by Aztec Autumn, 1997. The remaining four novels (Aztec Blood, 2002; Aztec Rage, 2006; Aztec Fire, 2008; Aztec Revenge, 2012) were written by other authors after Jennings died in 1999.

== Plot ==
In 1529, the Bishop of the See of New Spain, Juan de Zumárraga, receives a request from King Carlos of Spain to collect information regarding the indigenous population and their culture. The Bishop reluctantly employs Chicóme-Xochitl Tliléctic Mixtli ("Seven-Flower Dark Cloud"), an elderly Mexica man, for the task of narrating his biography to be transcribed by the monks of Mexico City and sent to Spain.

Born to ordinary parents on the island of Xaltocan in 1466, Mixtli describes the traditions, politics, and practices of the Triple Alliance. At the age of four, he accompanies his father, a stonemason, to Tenochtítlan to transport a sunstone for the central plaza. In his youth, Mixtli also engages in an incestuous sexual relationship with his sister Tzitzilíni. In school, Mixtli befriends Chimáli and Tlatli, who begin a sexual relationship of their own. At these schools, the boys are taught to fight and read, but Mixtli's eyesight hinders his progress. Upon the completion of his education, Mixtli receives an invitation from their governor Lord Red Heron to work in the palace of Nezahualpíli, the Uey-Tlatoáni of Texcóco as a scribe. There, he befriends his own slave Cozcatl. During his time there, he uncovers a conspiracy that leads to Tlatli's death, enraging Chimáli. Ahuítzotl completes the construction of the Great Pyramid and hopes to engage in a Flowery War with Texcóco to celebrate with human sacrifices.

Mixtli participates in this Flowery War, collecting enough prisoners of war to sacrifice to the sunstone. While Mixtli visits a menagerie and a collection of people with deformities, Chimáli emasculates Cozcatl as revenge. Mixtli earns from Ahuítzotl a career as a pochtécatl, travels through multiple regions, and returns with valuable goods to sell. At a celebration of the merchants' return, Mixtli learns from a "cocoa-bean man" (who had visited him long before, implied to be an old Aztec god) that Tzitzilíni was tortured and mutilated in his absence. In mourning, he flees Tenochtítlan to the village of the Cloud People who speak Zapotec. Mixtli invites Zyanya to a Huave village of cannibals to steal their stash of valuable purple dye. Zyanya and Mixtli fall in love and marry in Tenochtítlan, though present at the ceremony is Chimáli, now a member of Ahuítzotl's court. Enraged, Mixtli challenges him to a duel, which ends in Cozcatl removing Chimáli's eyes and tongue. Zyanya gives birth to their daughter Cocóton. During this time, Ahuítzotl unveils a new aqueduct in Tenochtítlan, but a flood levels the island and destroys people's homes. Though Mixtli's home is undamaged, Zyanya vanishes in the water, never seen again. In mourning, Mixtli leaves his daughter to Cozcatl and his wife while he wanders north, where he encounters a Rarámuri village under attack by Yaki bandits.

He returns to Tenochtítlan to find Ahuítzotl dead and the vainglorious Motecuzóma newly crowned, who assigns Mixtli to develop a town in Michihuácan territory with several settlers and priests. After they arrive, the priests brutally sacrifice Cocotón to Xipe Totec, and Mixtli orders his soldiers to rape and kill the settlers. Upon their return to Tenochtítlan, Mixtli marries Béu Ribé, Zyanya's estranged sister, only to immediately depart for the northern deserts to find the legendary Aztlan. He encounters Chichimeca nomads, who direct him to the area of Sinalobóla, where he finds a wasteland swamp inhabited by the Aztéca people. Mixtli teaches the tribal leader (tlatocapíli) about Tenochtítlan and negotiates a potential alliance with their own sunstone. Tired of his journeys, Mixtli heads home and stops at Teotihuácan, where he encounters Motecuzóma, who informs him of some mysterious omens from the southern Maya countries. There, Mixtli meets with a Xiu lord hosting two shipwrecked Spaniards who refuse to leave their chambers. After much prying, the Spaniards (Gonzalo Guerrero and Jerónimo de Aguilar) agree to explain their presence, having arrived from a Spanish colony in Cuba. At this time, Nezahualpíli dies, but his heir Black Flower is usurped when Nezahualpíli's other son and Motecuzóma's ally Cacáma assumes the throne in Texcóco.

Colonists from Cuba arrive in Totonáca country, among them Hernán Cortés and Pedro de Alvarado, who employ de Aguilar and an ambitious slave named Ce-Malináli to interpret for them. Motecuzóma, convinced the white men are gods, does little to deter the approach of the Spanish. Despite their encroaching on surrounding cities, Motecuzóma expresses indecision, prompting Mixtli and the court of Tenochtítlan to develop a conspiracy against him. Spanish forces arrive at Tenochtítlan, and Motecuzóma sympathizes with their campaign, even allowing them to execute his own pochtecatl and agrees to supply them with the nation's treasury of gold. Frustrated, the citizens of Tenochtítlan participate in a massacre against Spanish forces, while Hernán Cortés heads east to settle a criminal charge. The revolt fails, and Hernán Cortés prompts Motecuzóma to placate his people. When he steps onto his platform, they hurl stones at him and knock him unconscious. In the infirmary, Mixtli finds that he survived and stabs him, finally killing him and naming Cuitláhuac his successor, who orders his people to launch a greater attack on the Spanish, who flee the city. The citizens of Tenochtítlan fail to recuperate entirely, suffering from smallpox, cholera, and the plague, and once the Spanish recover, they launch a final attack on Tenochtítlan that levels the city to ashes and force the surviving Mexíca to rebuild the city in the Spanish style. The elderly Mixtli finds employment with Cortés and witnesses the hanging of the final three tlahtohqueh, which he considers the end of the Triple Alliance.

In 1531, with the completion of his biography, the Bishop of Mexico prosecutes Mixtli for heresy, despite the king's delayed request to grant Mixtli and Béu Ribé a pension (though it's implied that the Bishop ignored the request entirely). Mixtli makes no defense and accepts his execution by immolation.

== Historical accuracy ==
The novel faithfully recreates a great deal of historical geographic places and history, particularly that involving the Spanish conquest of the Aztec Empire in an expedition led by Hernán Cortés. Jennings, through Dark Cloud, presents generally accurate portrayals of the events surrounding a number of actual historical figures, their names usually rendered in traditional Nahuatl. This includes descriptions of many rulers ("Revered Speakers") of many civilizations, such as Ahuizotl and Moctezuma II of the Mexíca, Nezahualpilli of the Acolhua or Patzínca of the Totonac, La Malinche (rendered Cé-Malinali, "One Grass" in Nahuatl, and later self-proclaimed "Lady Grass", Malintzin), the shipwrecked Gerónimo de Aguilar and Gonzalo Guerrero, as well as Hernán Cortés himself and many of his retinue.

The novel's narrator maintains a voice of careful criticism of Spanish authorities throughout the novel. Though he professes himself a Christian, much of the novel is devoted to detailed discourse regarding Aztec religion, including a great deal of information regarding the gods Quetzalcoatl, Tlaloc, Huitzilopochtli, Tonatiuh, and especially Ehecatl. The novel also does not shy from depictions of ritual human sacrifice. Throughout the novel, Mixtli criticizes not only Christianity, but also the Spaniards' hypocrisy in espousing Christianity while simultaneously engaging in acts of great violence and degradation toward the native populations.

== Reception ==
Ernest Hogan reviewed Aztec for Different Worlds magazine and stated that "This is not a massive travelogue. Rather, it's full of characters, conflicts, plots, counterplots, and adventures that will keep you turning pages from Mixtli's birth to the eventual doom of his entire world with the coming of the Spaniards."

== Reviews ==
- Review by Thomas M. Disch for the Washington Post
- Review by Christopher Lehmann-Haupt for The New York Times
- Review by Thomas M. Disch in Rod Serling's The Twilight Zone Magazine, June 1982
