= Tatjana Soli =

American novelist and short-story writer

Tatjana Soli is an American novelist and short-story writer. Her first novel, The Lotus Eaters (2010), won the James Tait Black Memorial Prize (UK), was a finalist for the Los Angeles Book Prize, was a New York Times Bestseller, and a New York Times 2010 Notable Book. It has been optioned for a movie. Her second novel, The Forgetting Tree (2012) was a New York Times Notable Book. Soli's third novel, The Last Good Paradise, was among The Millions "Most Anticipated" Books of 2015. Her fourth novel, The Removes (2018), was named a New York Times Editor's Choice and longlisted for the Chautauqua Prize. Soli was longlisted for the Simpson/Joyce Carol Oates Literary Prize honoring a mid-career writer. Her non-fiction has appeared in a variety of publications including The New York Times Book Review.

== Education ==
Soli graduated from Stanford University, and later the Warren Wilson College with an MFA. She received scholarships to the Sewanee Writers' Conference and the Bread Loaf Writers' Conference.

== Work ==
Soli's debut novel, The Lotus Eaters, tells the story of a female photojournalist who goes to Vietnam to cover the war and falls in love with the country even as it is being torn apart. It was published in 2010, and featured on the front page of the New York Times Book Review. In the review, Danielle Trussoni wrote: "Helen’s restlessness and grappling, her realization that 'a woman sees war differently,' provide a new and fascinating perspective on Vietnam. Vivid battle scenes, sensual romantic entanglements and elegant writing add to the pleasures of The Lotus Eaters."

The Lotus Eaters uses a bookend structure that Janet Maslin in Books of The Times noted: "Soli’s haunting debut novel begins where it ought to end… This quick shift in time frames proves to be much more seductive than a simple introduction to the older, tougher Helen would be."

The novel went on to become New York Times bestseller. In 2011, the novel won the James Tait Black Memorial Prize, the oldest literary prize in the United Kingdom. In addition it was a Finalist for the Los Angeles Times Book Prize and named a NYT Notable Book. It has been optioned to become a feature film.

Her second novel, The Forgetting Tree (2012) was a New York Times Notable Book and NYT Editors' Choice. The book centers around a California ranching woman who runs her family's citrus farm and the Caribbean-born caretaker she hires to help her through an illness. Jane Smiley, in the New York Times, wrote: "Daring… haunting… The lesson Soli has to teach… is a salient one for the modern world: even a remote citrus ranch can be a crossroads where cultures collide, and those collisions can be life-changing for everyone involved."

Soli's third novel, The Last Good Paradise, was among The Millions "Most Anticipated" Books of 2015. It is the story of an LA power couple who run away to a South Sea Eco Resort to try to escape their problems. The Michigan Daily wrote of it: "With elegant prose that can swell into poetic intervals or sharp commentary, Soli presents a book that courses with flawed, colorful characters, lavish food descriptions (courtesy of a chef protagonist) and political intrigue. But beneath its lovely veneer is a book that confronts the American urge to escape".

Her fourth novel, The Removes, was published by Sarah Crichton Books, Farrar, Straus, & Giroux. It has been named a New York Times Editors' Choice, longlisted for the Chautauqua Prize, and a finalist for the Willa Award. It tells the story of the end of the Indian wars through the intertwining fates of Gen. Custer, his wife Libbie, and a settler girl taken captive. In a starred review, Booklist wrote: "Soli paints a stark portrait of the violence, hardship, and struggles that characterized the American West." True West Magazine named The Removes the Best Fiction of 2019. It was a finalist for a 2019 High Plains Book Award.

Her writing has appeared in a variety of publications including The New York Times Book Review. Her short stories have appeared in Zyzzyva, Boulevard, Five Chapters, The Normal School, The Sun, StoryQuarterly, Confrontation, Gulf Coast, Other Voices, Inkwell Journal, Nimrod, Third Coast, Carolina Quarterly, Sonora Review, North Dakota Quarterly, Washington Square Review, and Web del Sol.

== Personal life ==
She lives on the Monterey Peninsula, California.

== Subject ==
Soli's subject is the individual in history: how war and the clash of cultures impact lives. Her characters have included a female photojournalist in Vietnam, a California female citrus rancher battling illness, a contemporary female attorney, and a teenaged settler girl abducted by the Cheyenne during the Indian wars.

== Awards ==
- 2019 Finalist for the Willa Award for The Removes
- 2019 Longlisted for Chautauqua Prize for The Removes
- 2019 Longlisted for Joyce Carol Oates Literary Prize
- 2019 True West: Best Fiction for The Removes
- 2018 New York Times Editors' Choice for The Removes
- 2012 New York Times Notable Book for The Forgetting Tree
- 2012 New York Times Editors' Choice for The Forgetting Tree
- Winner of the 2010 James Tait Black Award for fiction for The Lotus Eaters
- 2011 American Library Association Notable Book for The Lotus Eaters
- 2010 Finalist, Los Angeles Times Book Prize Award for First Fiction for The Lotus Eaters
- 2010 New York Times Notable Book for The Lotus Eaters
- 2010 New York Times Editors' Choice for The Lotus Eaters
- 2010 Kirkus Reviews Best Book of the Year
- 2006 Finalist, Bellwether Prize
- 2003 Dana Award for The Lotus Eaters
- 2002 William Faulkner – William Wisdom Creative Writing Competition Prize

== Works ==
- The Removes. New York: Sarah Crichton Books, FSG. 2018. ISBN 978-0-374-24931-1.
- The Last Good Paradise. New York: St. Martin's Press. 2015. ISBN 978-1-250-04396-2.
- The Forgetting Tree. New York: St. Martin's Press. 2012. ISBN 978-1-250-00104-7.
- The Lotus Eaters. New York: St. Martin's Press. 2010. ISBN 978-0-312-61157-6.

=== Anthology ===
- M Marie Hayes, ed. (2003). StoryQuarterly. Vol. 39. Storyquarterly Inc. ISBN 978-0-9722444-1-1.
