= The Blood of Lorraine =

Novel by Barbara Corrado Pope

The Blood of Lorraine, the second crime novel by Barbara Corrado Pope, is set in France during the Belle Époque.

== Critical reception ==
Critics have reviewed The Blood of Lorraine favorably. Deborah Schoeneman of the Jewish Book Council wrote it is " a fascinating read, exploring religious, social, and political thinking, propaganda, and prejudice". Kirkus review reported it "gracefully transports the reader to its liveried era and broadens the story’s appeal with characters of substance and depth". Publishers Weekly concluded, "Pope, a historian, more than compensates for a not fully satisfying ending with a complex lead and the skill with which she makes the anti-Semitic atmosphere of the times both palpable and tragically prophetic."

== See also ==
- Cézanne’s Quarry
- The Missing Italian Girl
