= Raptor (novel) =

1993 historical novel written by Gary Jennings

- First edition cover
- Author: Gary Jennings
- Genre: Historical fiction
- Publication date: June 8, 1992
- ISBN: 0-385-24632-3

Raptor is a 1993 historical novel by American author Gary Jennings.

== Plot summary ==
Raptor is a historical novel set in the late fifth and early sixth centuries. It purports to be the memoirs of an Ostrogoth, Thorn, who has a secret: he is a hermaphrodite and takes on the name, "Thorn the Mannamavi", "a being uninhibited by conscience, compassion, remorse-a being as implacably amoral as the juika-bloth and every other raptor on this earth." Thorn discovers his sexuality rather unorthodoxly during his early teens. After he is banished from both a monastery and, later, a convent, he travels throughout the dying Roman Empire on a quest to meet his fellow Ostrogoths (even though it was never confirmed that Thorn was one; he simply assumed it by reaching several logical conclusions), meeting several characters; among the most crucial to the storyline: Theodoric and the retired Roman legionary-turned-woodsman Wyrd, with whom he forms close friendships.

Thorn lives his life chiefly as a man but can easily pass for a woman (he is beardless, has shoulder-length hair, and is relatively small-statured), and he uses this ambiguity for his own benefit. Throughout his life, Thorn conducts affairs with both men and women.

The novel treats actual historical events, the fall of the Western Roman Empire, the deposition of Romulus Augustulus by Scirian soldiers on 4 September AD 476, and Theodoric's assassination of Odoacer among them. Taking place in most of western Europe (the British Isles and Spain notably excepted), the story has an international feel, heightened by the appearance of several characters from different cultures (not only Romans and Goths but also Greeks, Celts, Huns, Jews and Syrians appear).

As is typical in Gary Jennings's novels, the plot is developed with historical detail (including extensive use of Gothic words, which the narrator calls "The Old Language") supplemented by graphic violence and bizarre sexual situations. Again typically, the story not only spans virtually the central character's entire life but also has a recurring theme: those whom Thorn loves, die.

== Characters ==
- Dom Clement - the head of the monastery where Thorn was raised. He develops a liking for Thorn and teaches him to read and write, but reluctantly banishes him from the monastery after a sexual scandal.
- Brother Peter - a Burgundian monk. Sexually abuses young Thorn while working with him in the monastery's kitchen.
- Wyrd - Known by his legionary colleagues as Caius Uiridus. A British Celt, from Cornwall. Served in the Roman legions, but after his retirement makes his living as a woodsman and fur-trader in the Alps. Encounters Thorn while he is wandering in the forest. Is cynical, foul-mouthed and is highly critical of Christianity. Initially treats Thorn with disdain, but later takes a liking to him and teaches him hunting and survival skills. Thorn eventually comes to look at him as a surrogate father.
- Livia - the young daughter of a Roman miner living in The Place of Echoes (near Salzburg). She seems attracted to Thorn but the feeling is not mutual, because of the difference in their ages (Thorn is around his late teens at the time, she is around ten).
- Thiuda - later Theodoric the Great, King of the Ostrogoths. Meets Thorn while both are young adults. Is impressed by Thorn's inventiveness and cunning. He later promotes Thorn to be a marshal.
- Amalamena - Theodoric's sister. Is one of the few people in Thorn's life who becomes aware of his secret.
- Veleda - Thorn's female alter ego, which Thorn uses to his advantage.
- Velox - Thorn's trusty horse. Given to him as a reward for rescuing the grandson of a Roman official from a band of Huns. During the course of the book, Thorn retires Velox gracefully, then rides two generations of horses sired by Velox. Thorn also names these offspring "Velox".
- Juika Bloth (Gothic for "I fight for blood") - Thorn's pet short-toed snake eagle. Thorn teaches it to attack on command by simply whispering the word "slait" (Gothic for "kill"). Thorn never figures out whether his eagle is a male or female, which is a reflection of the main character.
- Gudinand - Thorn's first male lover. Roughly around 18 years of age. Meets him during his travels in Helvetia (modern-day Switzerland).
- Sister Deidamia - a nun. Thorn's first female lover.
- Thor – a hermaphrodite whom Thorn encounters midway in his journeys. Except for their faces, both Thorn and Thor look like twins. Thor is a Visigoth who bears a scar on his back for having been unfaithful to his first male lover. The two initially create an insatiable sexual appetite for each other. Then Thorn learns how unscrupulous Thor is when he discovers that Thor had hanged Thorn's faithful woman servant Swanilda, who loved Thorn. At that point the raptor in Thorn takes over. Ultimately Thorn delivers Thor over to a group of Scythian tribeswomen (colloquially referred as "Amazons" by the locals), who sadistically take care of Thor.
