= Laura Blundy =

2000 historical novel by Julie Myerson

- First edition (publ. Fourth Estate)
- Author: Julie Myerson
- Genre: Historical fiction
- Publisher: Riverhead Books
- Publication date: 1 October 2000
- ISBN: 1-57322-168-6

Laura Blundy (2000) is a historical novel by English author Julie Myerson set in Victorian London. It is the story of a woman whose life takes a turn for the worse.

== Plot summary ==
After her mother has died in childbirth, Laura Blundy is brought up by her loving and caring father, a merchant and shopowner who also pays for her schooling. One day, on her way to her ailing aunt, she is given a lift by a young man in a carriage who rapes her and then throws her out of the carriage again. She becomes pregnant, and when both her father and her aunt die she is left penniless.

Unable to care for her baby son, she manages to have him raised in an institution. She occasionally goes there to inquire after him, but one day she is told that he has died and that he has been buried in an unmarked grave. The feeling of loss she experiences never leaves her again.

Laura Blundy spends the following 18 years of her life in the streets of London. When another woman's baby dies in her care she is charged with murder and has to go to prison. Years later she is set free again but almost immediately after her release she is run over by a carriage (whose driver does not stop). She is brought to hospital, where her leg is amputated. However, she falls in love with her surgeon. They get married, but Laura is attracted more by his cleanliness and moderate wealth than by his character or potency.

When, in mid-winter, Laura decides to commit suicide by drowning in the river Thames, she is rescued by Billy, a young worker employed in the building of the Victoria Embankment and London's sewage system. At one point in the novel, Billy comes into direct contact with Joseph Bazalgette, the chief engineer on this project. Although Billy has a wife and children, they start a love affair.

Some time later Laura beats her husband to death in his own home, making Billy an accomplice after the fact. Laura cuts up her husband's body, and then she and Billy carry the body in several bags to the river. As the surgeon's head keeps bobbing up and being washed ashore they eventually have to burn it.

At this point in her life Laura, already in her late thirties, may be pregnant once again. The lovers have plans of escaping to France.
