= Company of Liars =

2008 historical novel by Karen Maitland

- Author: Karen Maitland
- Subject: Plague
- Genre: Historical novel
- Publication date: 2008

Company of Liars is a 2008 historical novel by Karen Maitland, set in the fourteenth century. The setting is a Britain which is being decimated by a pandemic known as the Plague.
