= The Missing Italian Girl =

Novel written by Barbara Corrado Pope

The Missing Italian Girl, a third crime novel by Barbara Corrado Pope, is set in France during the Belle Époque. Clarie, one of its main characters, teaches at the Lycée Lamartine.

== Critical reception ==
Pope's third crime novel has had critical acclaim for its exploration of multiple Parises during the period just before the 20th century. "Although the book is billed as third in the Bernard Martin mystery series, the lead character is Bernard’s wife, Clarie," according to the Historical Novel Society Review. Publishers Weekly commented, "Pope’s engaging third mystery featuring magistrate Bernard Martin (after 2011’s The Blood of Lorraine) shines a light on both the glamor and the grime of late-19th-century Paris." Noting that the plot "flounders at points", the review continues, "Clarie’s struggle to balance her role as a bourgeois wife and mother against her investigative instincts will entice readers."

== See also ==
- Cézanne’s Quarry
- The Blood of Lorraine
