= Cézanne's Quarry =

2008 novel by Barbara Corrado Pope

- Cover of the novel, Cézanne's Quarry
- Author: Barbara Corrado Pope
- Language: English
- Series: Bernard Martin Mysteries
- Genre: Historical murder mystery
- Published: 17 July 2008
- Publisher: Pegasus
- Publication place: United States
- Pages: 384
- ISBN: 978-1605980607
- Followed by: The Blood of Lorraine

Cézanne's Quarry is a crime novel by Barbara Corrado Pope, published in 2008. Set in France during the Belle Époque, the novel imagines the artist Paul Cézanne becoming a suspect in the murder of a young woman.

== Plot ==
Hallie Ephron of The Boston Globe summarized the plot of Cézanne's Quarry:

Cézanne's Quarry opens with the murder of Solange Vernet, the woman with whom Pope imagines Cézanne became besotted. With experienced judges away on summer holiday, the investigation falls in the lap of Bernard Martin ("a judge with little experience and no family or connections in the South of France")... [Murder suspects] Westerbury and Cézanne are a study in contrasts – one a scientist who studies the mountains, the other an artist who paints them. Martin, growing into his role as investigator, becomes convinced that neither man is responsible. The ending delivers a satisfying twist.

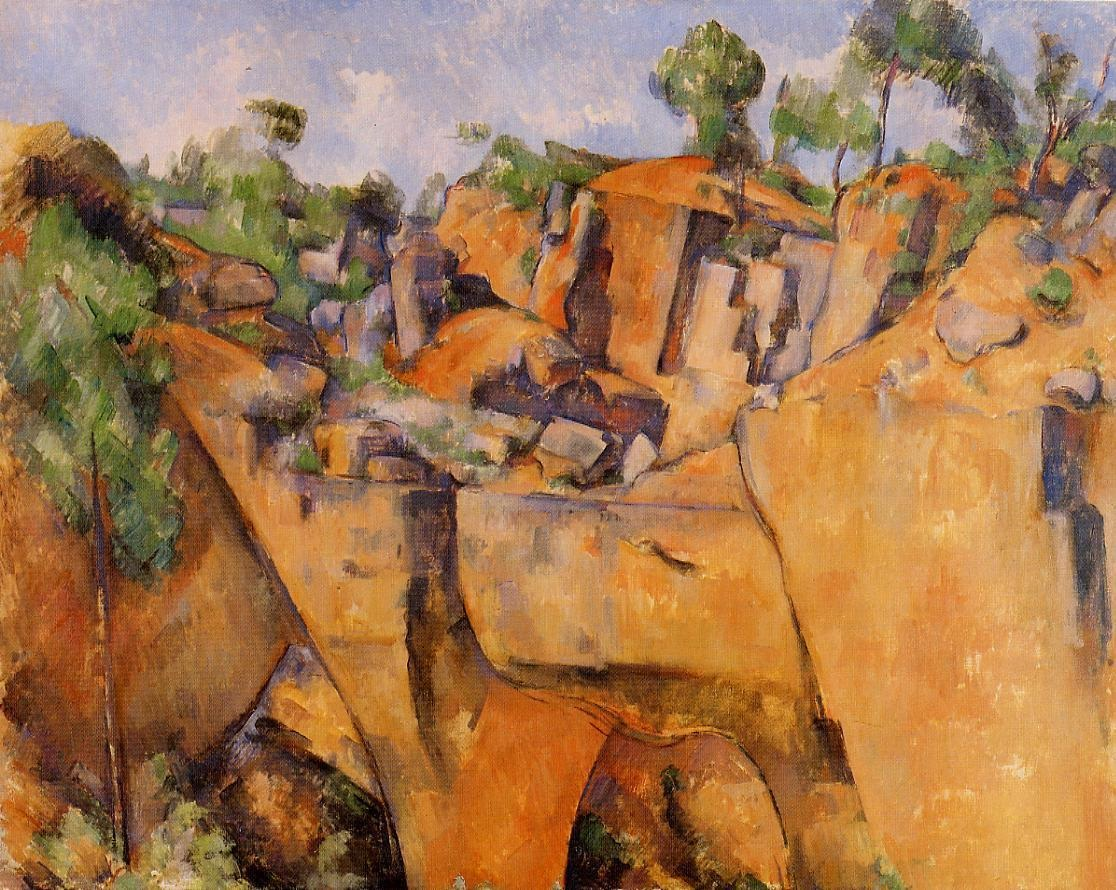
Cézanne's painting, La carrière de Bibémus

== Major themes ==
Charles Sowerwine wrote,"Pope starts each book with an historical moment which offers a context for exploring issues of class, gender and social justice." Hallie Ephron characterized the novel as "a thoughtful exploration of science and religion, of old values and new, and of a woman's place in the world". A review by the Historical Novels Society identified the subjects of the novel: "art, politics (of the Third Republic), love, the meaning of friendship, and the relationship between science and religion".

== Development history ==
=== Publication history ===
- 2008, by Pegasus Books in the United States, ISBN 978-1605980607, Pub date (17 April 2008). Reprint edition, (22 September 2009).

=== Explanation of the novel's title ===
According to Sowerwine, the novel's title is a play on the word quarry, referring to the quarry at Bibémus that Cézanne painted, which is the location of the murder; and it also refers to the central question of the novel, whether Cézanne's obsession with a beautiful woman made her his quarry.

== Reception ==
Critics praised Cézanne's Quarry for its vivid historical details, and Ephron said it "received immediate critical acclaim...", calling it a "highly accomplished, compelling novel". Margaret Donsbach of Historical Novels Info said, "Cézanne's Quarry is an insightful, psychologically astute debut novel," but commented on the slow pacing: "...it could have benefited from editing". Sowerwine commented that didacticism — explaining the historical and sociological contexts — slowed the plot, though he concluded these "asides do make valid points and illuminate Bernard’s personality".

== Awards and nominations ==
Cézanne's Quarry was nominated for the Oregon Book Award.

== See also ==
- The Blood of Lorraine
- The Missing Italian Girl
