= Julie Myerson =

English author and critic (born 1960)

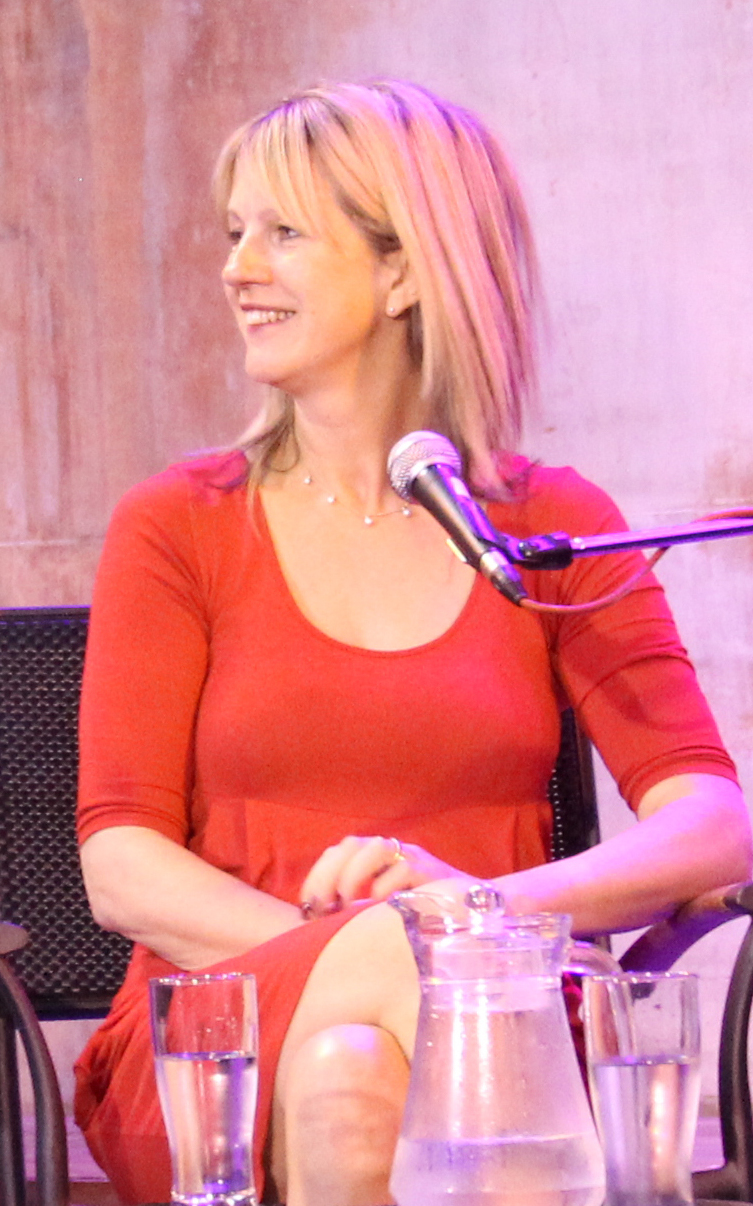
- Julie Myerson in November 2010
- Born: 2 June 1960 (age 66); Nottingham, England
- Occupations: Novelist, critic
- Writing career
- Genre: Literary fiction

Julie Susan Myerson (née Pike; 2 June 1960) is an English author and critic. As well as fiction and non-fiction books, she formerly wrote a column in The Guardian entitled "Living with Teenagers", based on her family experiences. She appeared regularly as a panellist on the arts programme Newsnight Review.

== Education and journalism ==
Myerson studied English at Bristol University and then worked for the National Theatre as a press officer.

She has written a column for The Independent about her domestic trials, including her husband, the screenwriter and director Jonathan Myerson, and their children Jacob (known as Jake), Chloe and Raphael. Since then, she has written a column for the Financial Times about homes and houses. Myerson was a regular reviewer on the UK arts programme, Newsnight Review, on BBC Two.

== Fiction ==
Myerson's novels are usually dark in mood, tending towards the supernatural.

Her first was Sleepwalking (1994), which was to some degree autobiographical. It deals in part with the suicide of an uncaring and abusive father. (Myerson's own father had committed suicide.) The main character Susan is heavily pregnant and begins an affair. She also feels she is haunted by her father's mother, reliving the neglect that had made him abusive. The book was shortlisted for the John Llewellyn Rhys Prize.

In The Touch (1996), a group of young people try to help a tramp who preaches fundamentalist Christianity and turns violently against them. In Me and the Fat Man (1999), a waitress takes to earning extra giving oral sex in a park, though not out of necessity. She gets involved with two other men, friends who have an awkward relationship and a secret between them that turns out to be related to her own birth. Laura Blundy (2001) is set in the Victorian period. Julie Myerson tries to bring out the freshness and modernity of the period as it would have appeared at the time. Something Might Happen (2003) is about a murder in a Suffolk seaside town based on Southwold, where Myerson has a second home.

The novel Nonfiction was published in 2022.

== Family controversies ==
Julie Myerson was the anonymous author of "Living with Teenagers", a Guardian column and later book that detailed the lives of a family with three teenage children. The column ended after one of the children was identified and ridiculed at school, although Myerson had denied being the author three times to her own children, only coming clean when it became clear there was no other option. After The Guardian confirmed the authorship, it removed the articles from its website to "protect their privacy".

Myerson was at the centre of a media controversy in March 2009, when details of her book The Lost Child: a True Story emerged; commentators criticised her for what Minette Marrin in The Sunday Times called "betrayal not just of love and intimacy, but also of motherhood itself". Tim Lott called the book a "moral failure", adding: "Julie has betrayed Jake for her own ambition." However, some critics took a diametrically opposing view. The Guardian's Mark Lawson, a friend of Julie Myerson, called the book noble, saying, its "elegance and thoughtfulness... and its warning of a fate that may overtake many parents – should not be lost in the extra-literary frenzy." The Observer's Kate Kellaway called the book rash but courageous, as if Myerson had tried to "write honestly about a nightmarish situation and a subject that never seems to get the attention it deserves." The book appeared in the US in August 2009.

Myerson stated in 2009 she might sell the film rights to The Lost Child at some point, "maybe in 20 years."

"My mother seems to have suggested that I somehow agreed to this book which isn't really correct. The book contains some poetry that I wrote when I was about 15 or 16 and I remember getting a call from my mother saying she'd pay me £1,000 if she could use it. I was scrabbling around for money at the time so of course I took it but that doesn't mean I wanted it to be published." - Jake Myerson

== Novels ==
- Sleepwalking (1994)
- The Touch (1996)
- Me and the Fat Man (1998)
- Laura Blundy (2000)
- Something Might Happen (2003)
- The Story of You (2006)
- Out of Breath (2007)
- Then (2011)
- The Quickening (2013)
- The Stopped Heart (2016)
- Nonfiction (2022)

== Non-fiction ==
- Home, The Story of Everyone Who Lived in Our House (2004)
- Not A Games Person (2005)
- Living with Teenagers – 3 kids, 2 parents, 1 Hell of a bumpy ride (2008)
- The Lost Child (2009)

== Awards ==
- 1994 Mail on Sunday/John Llewellyn Rhys Prize (shortlist) for Sleepwalking
- 2005 International Dublin Literary Award (shortlist) for Something Might Happen
- 2005 WH Smith Literary Award (shortlist) for Something Might Happen
