= Julian Stockwin =

British writer

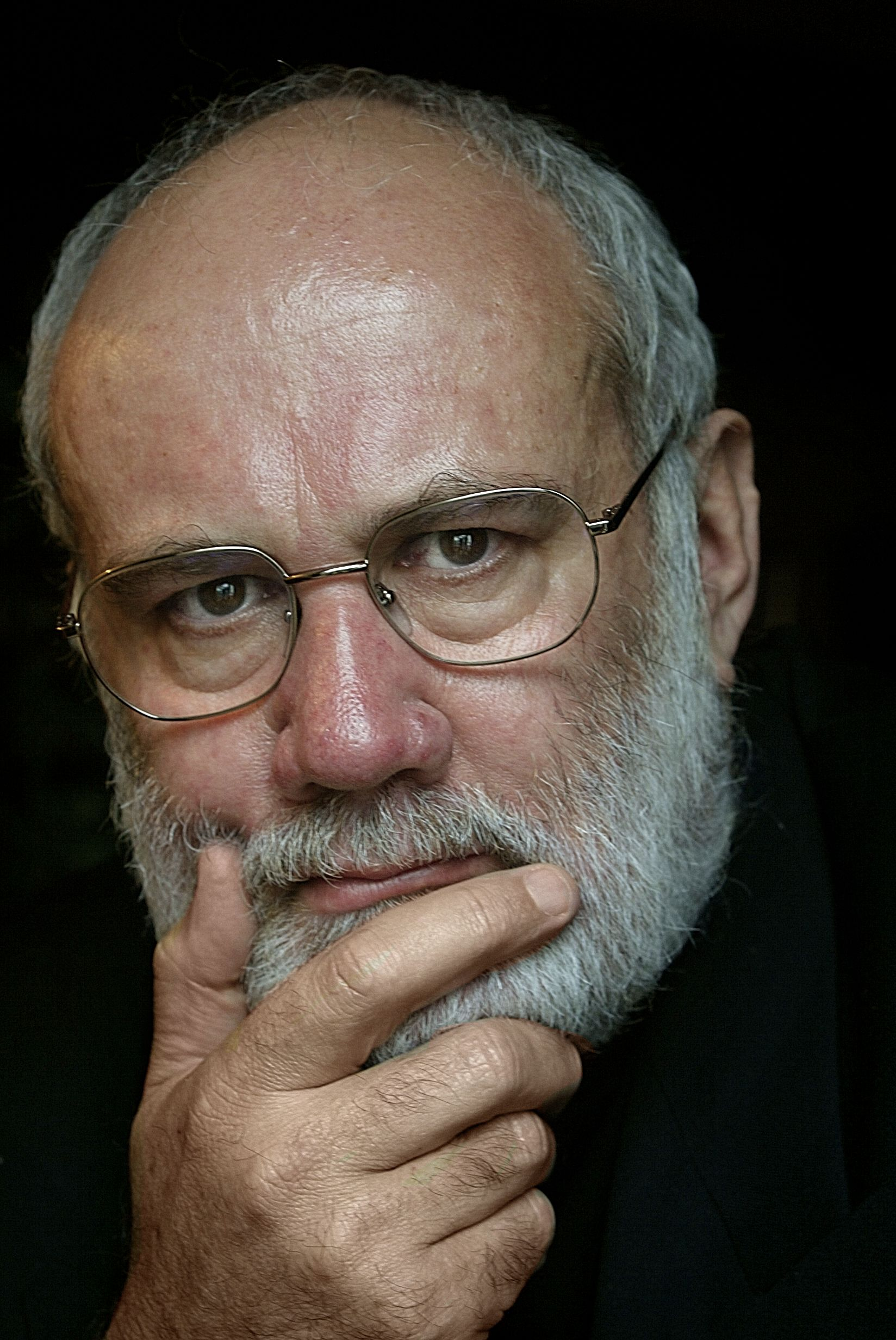
- Born: January 15, 1944 (age 82); Basingstoke, Hampshire, England
- Occupation: Novelist
- Writing career
- Genre: Nautical fiction
- Notable works: Kydd, Artemis, Seaflower, Mutiny, Quarterdeck, Tenacious, Command, The Admiral's Daughter, Treachery, Invasion, Victory, Conquest, Betrayal, Pasha, The Silk Tree, Stockwin's Maritime Miscellany
- Website: www.julianstockwin.com

Julian Stockwin MBE (born 1944 in Basingstoke, Hampshire, England) is an author of historical fiction, primarily nautical fiction. As well as the Kydd Series he has written two standalone novels The Silk Tree and The Powder of Death.

== Biography ==
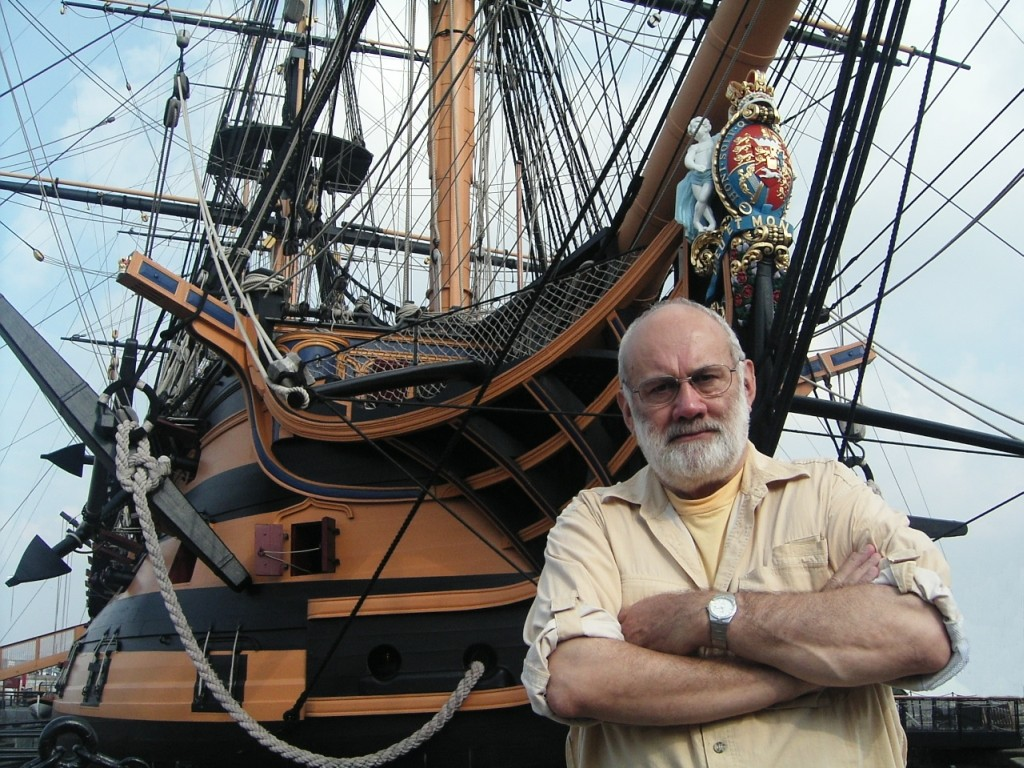
Julian in front of HMS Victory

Born in 1944, Stockwin soon developed a love for the sea, having an uncle, Tom Clay, who was a seaman in square-rigged ships and had sailed around Cape Horn in the Cutty Sark.

After grammar school, his father sent him to sea-training school at Indefatigable at age 14. He joined the Royal Navy at 15 and transferred to the Royal Australian Navy when his family emigrated. Stockwin served eight years, and was eventually rated petty officer.

Stockwin attended the University of Tasmania to read Far Eastern studies and psychology. He did post-graduate work in cross-cultural psychology. He got involved in the manufacture and design of computers and software development. Returning to the navy and the Royal Navy Reserve, Stockwin was honoured with an MBE. and retired as lieutenant commander.

He returned to the United Kingdom in 1990 and started to write in 1996. He currently resides in Ivybridge, Devon.

== Works ==
=== Thomas Kydd series ===
#	Title	Publisher	Publication Date
1	Kydd; 1793	Hodder & Stoughton	2001
A wig maker from Guildford, Thomas Kydd finds himself pressed into the service of the Crown as a landsman. His first berth is aboard HMS Duke William, where he befriends Nicholas Renzi.
2	Artemis; 1794	Hodder & Stoughton	2002
Now berthed in Artemis, Kydd journeys to the Pacific and China.
3	Seaflower; 1795	Hodder & Stoughton	2003
Kydd and Renzi are shipped to the Caribbean. There they join the cutter Seaflower.
4	Mutiny; 1797	Hodder & Stoughton	2004
The Nore mutiny finds Kydd with split loyalties – between his duty and his shipmates.
5	Quarterdeck; 1798	Hodder & Stoughton	2005
After being promoted to Lieutenant after the Nore Mutiny, Thomas Kydd joins Tenacious serving in Canada.
6	Tenacious; 1798	Hodder & Stoughton	2005
Kydd's ship Tenacious takes part in the Battle of the Nile.
7	Command; 1801–1802	Hodder & Stoughton	2006
Kydd is assigned as Commander of Teazer, patrolling the waters around Malta and the Mediterranean. When peace is declared he resigns his commission and sails to the antipodes as captain of a merchant ship.
8	The Admiral's Daughter; 1803	Hodder & Stoughton	2007
War with France resumes. Again in command of Teazer, Kydd has challenges both naval and relational as he encounters an Admiral's daughter, the sophisticated Persephone Lockwood.
9	Treachery; 1803 (aka The Privateer's Revenge in the USA)	Hodder & Stoughton	2008
Kydd is disgraced and leaves naval service. However he takes to the sea again as a privateer.
10	Invasion; 1804	Hodder & Stoughton	2009
Exonerated and back in Naval service, Kydd encounters the rocket inventor Robert Fulton.
11	Victory; 1805	Hodder & Stoughton	2010
Our hero takes part in the build-up to and the Battle of Trafalgar off the coast of Spain.
12	Conquest; 1806	Hodder & Stoughton	2011
Cape Town, a Dutch colony, is to be taken; Kydd joins a joint expedition of land- and sea-based forces.
13	Betrayal; 1806	Hodder & Stoughton	2012
Kydd travels from South Africa to Buenos Aires to take part in Commodore Popham's audacious attack.
14	Caribbee; 1806	Hodder & Stoughton	2013
The sugar trade, vital to British interests, is threatened. Kydd must respond.
15	Pasha; 1807	Hodder & Stoughton	2014
Istanbul and the Dardanelles are the setting for conflict and intrigues. Kydd’s 'particular friend' Renzi is right at the heart of things.
16	Tyger; 1807	Hodder & Stoughton	2015
Kydd gains command of HMS Tyger at a critical moment in his career.
17	Inferno; 1807	Hodder & Stoughton	2016
The Danish fleet is the focus of British and French attention; with Napoleon's forces rapidly approaching Copenhagen diplomacy is vital.
18	Persephone; 1807	Hodder & Stoughton	2017
Kydd, now a celebrated hero, takes HMS Tyger to Lisbon and meets his old flame Persephone Lockwood.
19	The Baltic Prize; 1808	Hodder & Stoughton	2017
At short notice Tyger is called to join a newly assembled fleet and sent to the Baltic and the only remaining continental ally to Great Britain, the kingdom of Sweden. Kydd finds he is to serve under Sir James Saumarez, a Vice-Admiral whom he has encountered before.
20	The Iberian Flame; 1808	Hodder & Stoughton	2018
The Iberian peninsula is in ferment and Bonaparte seeks to carve up Portugal and install his brother Joseph as King of Spain. Renzi is sent to incite opposition to France's intentions in Spain. Kydd becomes embroiled in support of the British expeditionary force in northwestern Spain.
21	A Sea of Gold; 1809	Hodder & Stoughton	2018
Back in London after Corunna, Kydd is again the hero. Soon, thrust into the forefront of the action at the insistence of Lord Thomas Cochrane, the Basque Roads are the scene of his next encounter with the French. In addition financial ruin beckons.
22	To the Eastern Seas; 1810	Hodder & Stoughton	2019
The Dutch East Indies and their spice trade attract France and Britain. Admiral Pellew and his force including Kydd attempt to intervene and colonialist Stamford Raffles persuades Kydd to aim at the Moluccas rather than take a more steady approach.
23	Balkan Glory; 1811	Hodder & Stoughton	2020
Now in the Adriatic, Kydd has even caught the attention of Bonaparte himself. Kydd and his small fleet are to harass the enemy in this region of ocean whilst Renzi is to stop Dubourdieu. The route to India is the prize.
24	Thunderer; 1812	Hodder & Stoughton	2021
An invasion fleet is being mustered across the channel from Britain, Kydd must investigate; but he now has a ship of the line the 74 gun "Thunderer". Is this the invasion long feared or is it targeted elsewhere?
25	Yankee Mission; 1812	Hodder & Stoughton	2022
The US navy are beginning to fall on frigates of the Royal Navy, so who should the admiralty send to deal with the threat other than their highly successful and much decorated Sir Thomas Kidd and with a crack frigate at his command.
26	Sea of Treason; 1813	Hodder & Stoughton	2023
Returning to England from America Kydd again takes command of Thunderer and is sent to the Bermuda and the Caribbean.
27	Admiral; 1814	Hodder & Stoughton	2024

=== Other historical fiction ===
- The Silk Tree (2014) A fictional account of the bringing silkworm eggs to the Byzantine Empire from China.
- The Powder of Death (2016) A fictional account of how gunpowder came to England and its use in cannons.

=== Non-fiction works ===
- Stockwin's Maritime Miscellany (2009)
