= Kay the Left-Handed =

1935 historical novel by Leslie Barringer

- First edition
- Author: Leslie Barringer
- Language: English
- Genre: Historical novel
- Publisher: William Heinemann
- Publication date: 1935
- Publication place: United Kingdom
- Media type: Print (Hardback)
- Pages: 284

Kay the Left-Handed is a historical novel by Leslie Barringer set in twelfth century England. It was first published in the United Kingdom by Heinemann in 1935; an American edition from Doubleday followed later the same year.

== Plot ==
The book is set in the area of York, England in the twelfth century, beginning with the 1189 massacre of the Jews in York, in which the protagonist, Kay FitzRomund, is a reluctant participant. Kay is an orphan seeking to better his lot, whose rise is aided by a glib facility with words and a prudent distrust of his fellow men and hampered by a soft heart and his own temper. Apprenticed to a scrivener, he loses his position through a tavern brawl; later, he fortuitously acquires a knowledge of buried treasure, whose location he trades to Prince John in return for preferment. The prince was desperately in search of extra wealth at this time - a fact known to Kay - as in September 1189, Prince John had already declared his intention of joining the Third Crusade. Kay loses both his new status and his right hand when he kills Bertrand de Montfort, a personal enemy. Consigned to outlawry, he eventually succeeds in reestablishing his respectability under a new identity.

== Reception ==
Margaret Wallace, reviewing the novel for the New York Times, called it "a more than usually mature story" for its genre, "full-blooded and thoughtful" and "as exciting and filled with adventure as anything ever conceived by Sir Walter Scott ." She noted that the author did not share the "illusions concerning the romantic glamour of the Middle Ages" common to such stories, and so, unlike most, it was not suitable for children.

Kirkus Reviews notes that the book, "[t]hough less idealistic and romantic in handling, ... might appeal to the Jeffery Farnol market."
