= Karen Maitland =

British writer

Karen Maitland (born 1956) is a British author of medieval thriller fiction. Maitland has an honours degree in Human Communication and doctorate in Psycholinguistics.

Her works include The White Room published in 1996 by Yorkshire Art Circus; Company of Liars published in 2008 by Delacorte Press; and The Owl Killers, published in 2009 by Michael Joseph. The Gallows' Curse was published by Penguin Books in March 2011.

She has co-written several titles in the Medieval Murderers series with medieval crime writers including Bernard Knight, Ian Morson, Susanna Gregory, and Philip Gooden. She has worked as a writer and editor on a number of cross-cultural books including "Poems of Cultural Diversity" and "Cinders in the Wind". Maitland is dyslexic and resides in the medieval city of Lincoln, not very far from Sherwood Forest.

== Bibliography ==
Stand alone novels

- The White Room (1996)
- Company of Liars (2008)
- The Owl Killers (2009)
- The Gallows Curse (2011)
- The Falcons of Fire and Ice (2012)
- The Vanishing Witch (2014)
- The Raven's Head (2015)
- The Plague Charmer (2016)
- A Gathering of Ghosts (2018)

Medieval Murderers (incomplete list)

(Short story collections, written together with Bernard Knight, Ian Morson, Susanna Gregory, Philip Gooden and others)

- The Sacred Stone (2010)
- Hill of Bones (2011)
- The False Virgin (2013)
- The Deadliest Sin (2014)

== Awards ==
- "The White Room", was short listed for The Authors' Club Best First Novel Award.
- "Company of Liars" was chosen as a Waterstone Book-of-the-Year
- "The Owl Killers" was a 2009 Shirley Jackson Award finalist

== Memberships ==
- Crime Writers' Association
- Historical Novel Society
- Society of Authors
- International Thriller Writers
