= Gyrfalcon Islands =

Island group in Nunavut, Canada

- Location within Nunavut Location within Canada

Geography
- Location: Ungava Bay
- Coordinates: 59°05′N 68°57′W
- Archipelago: Arctic Archipelago
- Total islands: Over 200
- Area: 150 km^{2} (58 sq mi)

Administration
- Canada
- Nunavut: Nunavut
- Region: Qikiqtaaluk

Demographics
- Population: Uninhabited

The Gyrfalcon Islands are an uninhabited island group in the Qikiqtaaluk Region of Nunavut, Canada. The over 200 small islands form an archipelago in western Ungava Bay north of Quebec's Ungava Peninsula and 19.7 km (12.2 mi) northeast of Leaf Bay. Tiercel Island and Qikirtajuaq Island lie to the southwest. The closest community is the Inuit village of Kuujjuaq, 120 km (75 mi) to the southeast.

== Geography ==
The islands are organized in series of north-west and south-east parallel chains. Their habitat is characterized by high, powerful tides, open sea, coastal cliffs, and rocky marine shores.

== Flora ==
Vegetation is sparse, though tundra plants can be found away from shore. These include Arctic willow, crowberry, sedges, mosses and lichens.

== Fauna ==
The Gyrfalcon Islands are a Canadian Important Bird Area (#NU028). Their notable bird species includes the common eider.

Walrus frequent the area during the summer.
