= The Virgin of the Sun =

1922 novel by H. Rider Haggard

- First edition (UK)
- Author: H. Rider Haggard
- Language: English
- Publisher: Cassell (UK); Doubleday, Page (US)
- Publication date: 1922
- Publication place: United Kingdom

The Virgin of the Sun is a novel by British writer H. Rider Haggard set in South America.

== Plot ==
The Virgin of the Sun features a fictional Pre-Columbian transoceanic contact between a medieval Englishman and the Incas. The novel centres on Hubert of Hastings, a London merchant at the time of King Richard II. Hubert falls foul of one of Richard's courtiers, and makes a sea voyage with a mysterious associate, Kari. Hubert eventually travels to Peru. Here he meets the titular character, Quilla, an Inca princess.

== Reception ==
The Australian newspaper The Argus stated that The Virgin of the Sun was "The most picturesque story that Sir Rider Haggard has written for many years." The review added "this novel will appeal strongly to those who enjoy highly imaginative tales of love and adventure".
