= The Lotus Eaters (novel) =

2010 novel by Tatjana Soli

- Author: Tatjana Soli
- Publisher: St. Martin's Press
- Publication date: 2010
- Pages: 389
- ISBN: 978-0-312-61157-6
- OCLC: 456171361

The Lotus Eaters (2010) is a novel by Tatjana Soli. It tells the story of an American woman who goes to war-torn Vietnam as a combat photojournalist and finds herself in a love triangle with two men. The novel was awarded the James Tait Black Memorial Prize for fiction.

== Plot ==
After her brother's death in Vietnam, Helen Adams decides to go there herself as a combat photojournalist covering the Vietnam War. In Vietnam, Helen meets famous prize-winning photographer Samuel Darrow, who becomes her mentor and the object of her affection. Her relationship with the married Sam is complicated by his drinking, as well as by her involvement with his Vietnamese assistant Linh, an ex-soldier and playwright whose tragic past includes losing his family. After Sam's death in a helicopter crash, Helen and Linh marry.

== Characters ==
- Helen Adams: American woman who dreams of becoming a photographer for Life. Her father and brother Michael were soldiers, and after dropping out of college due to Michael's death, Helen decides to go Vietnam herself. She falls in love with famed photographer Sam Darrow, but the relationship is tested by Sam's drinking, and a love triangle with Sam's assistant Linh.
- Nguyen Pran Linh: Ex-soldier and assistant to Sam. His first wife, Mai, died while pregnant with the couple's first child, and he was later taken in by Sam. He and Sam became rivals for Helen's affection.
- Samuel Andre Darrow : Famous photographer of Hungarian heritage who becomes Helen's mentor and lover, though he is married to Lily.
- Robert: Friend of Sam's who jokes about Helen being Sam's girlfriend, and has feelings for Annick.
- Annick : Woman who befriends Helen and dates Robert. She owns a store that Helen frequents.
- Matt Tanner : Marine who tries to rape Helen.
- Captain Olsen: American army officer.
- Jerry Nichols: USAID worker with a Vietnamese girlfriend.
- Ngah: Young traveller and guide who falls in love with the Linh.
- Mai: Linh's former wife, who died in childbirth amidst gunfire.
- Thao: Mai's sister who is attracted to a disinterested Linh.
- Tran Bin Thao: Linh's brother, who hides feelings for Lan.
- Taon: Mai and Lan's brother.
- Mr Bao: Linh's boss, who secretly sells drugs to foreigners.
- Gary: Helen's boss.
- Lily Darrow: Sam's wife, who blames Helen for his death in Saigon.
- Charlotte Adams: Helen's mother.
- Mrs Xuan: Lihn's neighbour who attends his wedding to Helen.

== Awards ==
The Lotus Eaters was awarded the James Tait Black Memorial Prize for fiction.
