= Gary Jennings (author) =

American author (1928–1999)

- Born: September 20, 1928; Buena Vista, Virginia, U.S.
- Died: February 13, 1999 (aged 70); Pompton Lakes, New Jersey, U.S.
- Education: Eastside High School
- Occupation: Author
- Parent(s): Glen Edward Jennings; Vaughnye May Jennings
- Writing career
- Genre: Historical fiction
- Website: www.garyjennings.com

Gary Jennings (September 20, 1928 – February 13, 1999) was an American author who wrote children's and adult novels. In 1980, after the successful novel Aztec, he specialized in writing adult historical fiction novels.

== Biography ==
Born September 20, 1928, in Buena Vista, Virginia, to Glen Edward and Vaughnye May Jennings, Gary Jennings attended little formal school after graduating from Eastside High School (of Lean on Me fame) in Paterson, New Jersey, and was mostly self-educated thereafter.

His novels were known for their historical detail and occasionally graphic content. Jennings's novels are well-researched: he lived for 12 years in Mexico to research the Aztec novels, traveled the Balkans while researching Raptor, and joined nine circus troupes during the writing of Spangle. He also produced a number of novels for younger readers, such as A Rope in the Jungle, and a history of the occult, titled Black Magic, White Magic.

Gary Jennings died in February 1999 in Pompton Lakes, New Jersey, aged 70, from heart failure.

== Bibliography ==
=== Aztec series ===
- Aztec (1980) : A story of the Aztec empire just before and during the arrival of the Spaniards.
- Aztec Autumn (1997), a story of the Aztecs following the Spanish conquest.

Additional books in the series (Aztec Blood, 2002; Aztec Rage, 2006; Aztec Fire, 2008; Aztec Revenge, 2012) were written by Robert Gleason, Jennings's former editor, and Junius Podrug.

=== Novels ===
- The Terrible Teague Bunch (1975): about a gang of Texas outlaws at the tail end of the Old West
- Sow the Seeds of Hemp (1976): about a fire-breathing preacher in Mississippi
- The Journeyer (1984): An account of the travels of Marco Polo to the Far East.
- Spangle (1987): A chronicle of the lives of circus entertainers. Also released in paperback, split into a trilogy: The Road Show, The Center Ring and The Grand Promenade.
- The Lively Lives of Crispin Mobey (by 'Gabriel Quyth') (1988): "A novel of the hilarious chronicle of the exploits of an all-too-zealous missionary." Mostly assembled from a series of short stories published under Jennings's real name in The Magazine of Fantasy and Science Fiction 1972–1979.
- Raptor (1992): Thorn, a hermaphrodite, and their adventures in a post-Roman world.

=== For young adults ===
- March of the Robots: From The Manikins Of Antiquity To The Space Robots Of Tomorrow (1962)
- The Movie Book (1963)
- Parades!: Celebrations and circuses on the march (1966)
- The Teenager's Realistic Guide to Astrology (1971)
- The Shrinking Outdoors (1972)
- The Killer Storms: Hurricanes, Typhoons, and Tornadoes (1974)
- Black Magic, White Magic (1975)
- March of the Heroes: The folk hero through the ages (1975)
- March of the Gods (1976)
- The Rope in the Jungle (a novel) (1976)
- March of the Demons (1977)

=== For preschool readers ===
- The Earth Book (1975)

=== Nonfiction ===
- Personalities of Language (1965)
- World of Words: The Personalities of Language (1967)
- The Treasure of the Superstition Mountains (1973)
