= Cultural depictions of William II of England =

William II of England has been depicted in various cultural media.

William II appears in Knight's Fee (1960), a children's historical novel by Rosemary Sutcliff. Sutcliff's novel depicts William as secretly being a pagan. Knight's Fee was influenced by Sutcliff's reading of the essay "The Arrow and the Sword" (1947) by Hugh Ross Williamson and the book The Divine King in England (1954) by Margaret Murray, which both argued that William was covertly an adherent of a pre-Christian religion.

William II is indirectly the subject of two historical novels by George Shipway, The Paladin and The Wolf Time. The main character of the novels is Walter Tirel (or Tyrell), his supposed assassin, and the main thrust of the plot of the novels is that the assassination was engineered by Henry I.

The death of William Rufus is portrayed in Edward Rutherfurd's 2000 fictionalised history of the New Forest, The Forest. In Rutherfurd's version of events, the king's death takes place nowhere near the Rufus Stone, and Walter Tyrrell is framed for it by the powerful Clare family. Also, Purkiss is a clever story teller who manages (much later) to convince Charles II of England that one of his ancestors had been involved.

William Rufus is a major character in Valerie Anand's 1989 historical novel, King of the Wood (1989). He is also a major character in Parke Godwin's Robin and the King (1993), the second volume in Godwin's reinterpretation of the Robin Hood legend. William Rufus and his relationship with Tyrell is mentioned and the manner of his death is included in Lammas Night by Katherine Kurtz. He is a character in Stephen R. Lawhead's King Raven Trilogy about Robin Hood. William Rufus' life is the focus of Judith Tarr's historical fantasy novel, King's Blood (2005). William features in the novel Heir to a Prophecy (2014) by Mercedes Rochelle, where he encounters King Malcolm III of Scotland, as well as characters from William Shakespeare's play Macbeth. William also appears briefly in The Rufus Spy (2018), one of the Aelf Fen historical mystery novels by Alys Clare.

On television, William was portrayed by Peter Firth in the 1990 play Blood Royal: William the Conqueror, directed by Peter Jefferies.

Singer Frank Turner told the story of the death of William II in the song "English Curse" from his 2011 album England Keep My Bones.
