= Cardinal Mazarin =

Italian clergyman and politician (1602–1661)

His Eminence Jules Mazarin
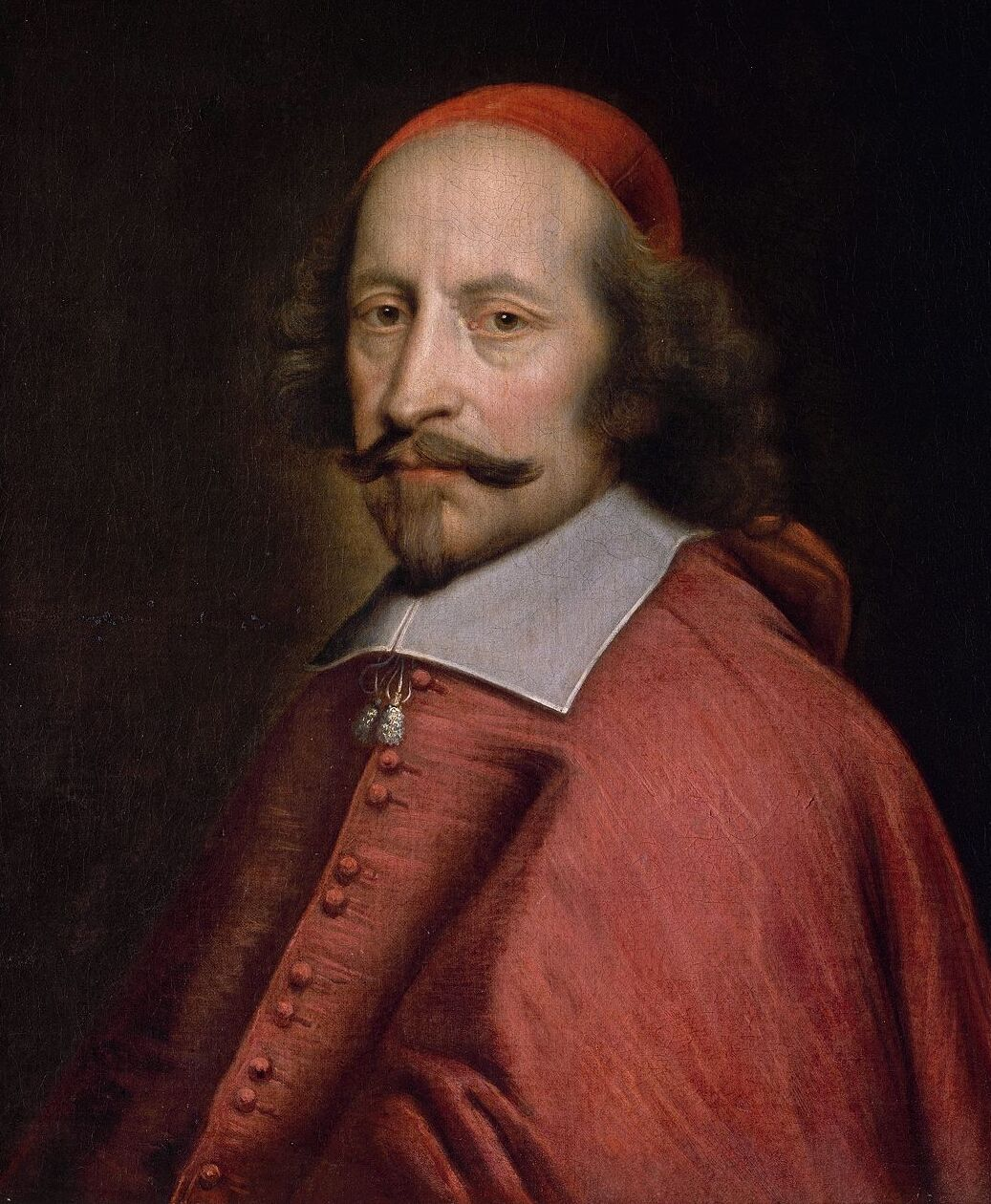
- Portrait by Pierre Mignard, 1658

First Minister of State
- In office 4 December 1642 – 9 March 1661
- Monarchs: Louis XIII; Anne of Austria (regent); Louis XIV
- Preceded by: The Duke of Richelieu
- Succeeded by: Jean-Baptiste Colbert

Personal details
- Born: Giulio Raimondo Mazzarino; 14 July 1602 Pescina, Abruzzo Ultra, Kingdom of Naples
- Died: 9 March 1661 (aged 58) Vincennes, Île-de-France, France
- Education: Roman College
- Profession: Clergyman, statesman
- Cardinal, Bishop of Metz
- Metropolis: Immediately Subject to the Holy See
- Diocese: Metz
- See: Metz
- Appointed: 29 November 1653
- Term ended: 1658
- Predecessor: Henri de Bourbon
- Successor: Franz Egon of Fürstenberg
- Other post: Abbot of Cluny (1654–1661)

Orders
- Created cardinal: 16 December 1641 by Pope Urban VIII
- Rank: Cardinal-deacon

Personal details
- Denomination: Catholic Church
- Motto: Firmando firmior hæret; Hinc ordo, hinc copia rerum
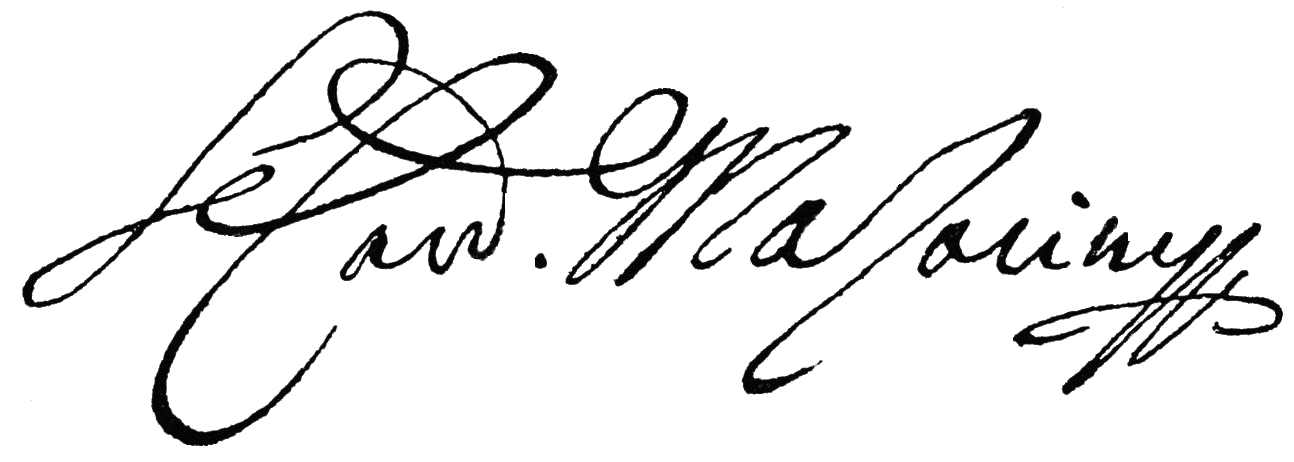
- Signature: Cardinal Mazarin's signature

Styles of Jules Raymond Mazarin
- Reference style: His Eminence
- Spoken style: Your Eminence
- Informal style: Cardinal
- See: Metz

Jules Mazarin (Note: English pronunciation: /ˈmæzərɪn/, UK also /ˈmæzəræ̃/, US also /ˌmæzəˈræ̃/; French pronunciation: [ʒyl mazaʁɛ̃].) (born Giulio Raimondo Mazzarino (Note: Italian pronunciation: [ˈdʒuːljo raiˈmondo maddzaˈriːno].) or Mazarini; 14 July 1602 – 9 March 1661), from 1641 known as Cardinal Mazarin, was an Italian Catholic prelate, diplomat and statesman who served as the chief minister to the Kings of France Louis XIII and Louis XIV from 1642 to his death. He was made a cardinal in 1641.

After serving as a papal diplomat for Pope Urban VIII, Mazarin offered his diplomatic services to Cardinal Richelieu and moved to Paris in 1640. After the death of Richelieu in 1642, Mazarin took his place as first minister of Louis XIII, and then of Louis XIV, when he succeeded to the throne in 1643. Mazarin acted as the head of the government for Anne of Austria, the regent for the young Louis XIV, and was also responsible for the king's education until he came of age. The first years of Mazarin in office were marked by military victories in the Thirty Years' War, which he used to make France the main European power and establish the Peace of Westphalia (1646–1648). A major uprising against Anne of Austria and Mazarin, called the Fronde and led by the nobles of the Parlement of Paris, broke out in Paris in 1648, followed by a second Fronde, led by Louis, Grand Condé, who had turned from his chief ally to his chief enemy. Mazarin took Anne of Austria and Louis XIV out of Paris and then shifted his base to Germany for a time. Turenne, a general loyal to Louis XIV and Mazarin, defeated Condé, and Mazarin made a triumphal return to Paris in 1653.

The last years of Mazarin's life, between 1657 and his death in 1661, were marked by a series of major diplomatic victories. In 1657 he made a military alliance with England. In 1658 he unveiled the League of the Rhine. The same year, Marshal Turenne decisively defeated the army of Condé at the Battle of the Dunes in Flanders. On 7 November 1659, Spain signed the Treaty of the Pyrenees, which added three new provinces to France. In 1660 Mazarin arranged the marriage of Louis XIV to Maria Theresa of Spain, which ended the long and costly wars between the Habsburgs and France. Exhausted by his diplomatic efforts, Mazarin died in 1661.

Mazarin, as the de facto ruler of France for nearly two decades, played a crucial role in establishing the Westphalian principles that would guide European states' foreign policy and the prevailing world order. Some of the principles, such as the nation state's sovereignty over its territory and domestic affairs and the legal equality among states, have remained the basis of international law to this day. In addition to his diplomacy, Mazarin was an important patron of the arts. He introduced Italian opera on a grand scale to Paris and assembled a remarkable art collection, much of which today can be seen in the Louvre. He also founded the Bibliothèque Mazarine, the first true public library in France, which is now found in the Institut de France, across the Seine from the Louvre.

== Early life ==
Giulio Mazzarino was born on 14 July 1602 in Pescina in the Abruzzo region of Italy, about 120 km from Rome. His parents were residents of Rome, spending the summer in Pescina to escape the summer heat. His father, Pietro Mazzarino (1576–1654), had moved to Rome from Sicily in 1590 to become a chamberlain in the family of Filippo I Colonna, the Grand Constable of Naples. His father became a citizen of Rome in 1608. His mother Ortensia Bufalini (1574–1646) was a native of Rome, from the Bufalini family of nobility whose origins were in Città di Castello in Umbria. The family had moved to Rome in the Middle Ages. She was the goddaughter of Filippo I Colonna, her husband's employer. Giulio was the eldest of six children, two boys and four girls.

According to unverifiable anecdotes, Giulio was admitted at the age of seven to the Jesuit Collegio Romano, which had acquired an international reputation for excellence. Professors included the German mathematician Christopher Clavius and the Italian theologian Robert Bellarmine. Mazarin excelled in his studies. In 1618, at the age of sixteen, he publicly defended his final thesis, about a comet that had appeared that year and which was prepared under the supervision of the astronomer Orazio Grassi, whose theories about comets contradicted those of Galileo. It is not clear what Mazarin thought of this dispute. He also excelled in theatrics; he was chosen to play the part of the newly sainted Ignatius of Loyola in a religious pageant. He also acquired the habit of gambling at cards, and was frequently in debt. A particular favourite game of his was a variant of Hoc named after him: Hoc Mazarin.

When he was twenty his father decided to send him away from the bad influences of Rome. Giulio accompanied Girolamo Colonna, one of the sons of Filippo I Colonna, who was eighteen, to the Complutense University of Madrid (then located in Alcalá de Henares) in Spain. He studied law with Girolamo during the daytime and in the evenings continued to gamble and again was in debt. A notary who had advanced some cash to cover gaming debts urged the charming and personable young Mazarino to take his daughter as bride, with a substantial dowry, and Giulio accepted. Girolamo Colonna wrote urgently to his father in Rome, and Giulio was ordered to return immediately to Rome, without his fiancée.

== Papal envoy ==
Upon his return to Rome, he resumed his studies, this time in law. In 1628 he received the title of doctor in utroque jure, meaning he could practice both civil and canonical law. In the same year Ferdinand II, the Habsburg emperor, laid claim to a papal territory, the Valtellina, in the Italian alps. Pope Urban VIII raised an army to defend his territory. The Prince of Palestrina, who was also a member of the Colonna family, commanded a new regiment of the Papal army, and invited Giulio to become a lieutenant in the regiment. Since neither the regiment nor Giulio had any military experience, they were assigned to a town far from the front line. Giulio knew little of military discipline. He received a message from Rome informing that his mother was seriously ill. Without asking permission from his commander, he immediately rode to Rome, and stayed there until his mother had recovered. He was summoned before the Pope, Urban VIII, to explain why he had deserted his post. He threw himself at the feet of the Pope, and pleaded to be pardoned for his excess of loyalty to his family. The Pope was impressed by Giulio's spontaneity and eloquence, forgave his desertion, and invited him to become a Papal emissary.

In 1628 Mazarin was named the secretary to Jean-François Sacchetti, a senior papal diplomat, who was trying to prevent the impending War of the Mantuan Succession between the armies of France and Spain for dominance of that region of northern Italy. Throughout 1629 and 1630 he shuttled between Milan, Mantua, Turin, Casale and France, trying to find a solution to the crisis before the fighting began. This became, throughout his career, his standard method of diplomacy; traveling continually, getting to know and win the trust of as many decision-makers as possible. During this time he came to know Cardinal Francesco Barberini, the head of diplomacy for the papacy, and, more important, Cardinal Richelieu of France, his future mentor, whom he first met in Lyon on 29 January 1630. Richelieu was aloof and confrontational; he wrote afterwards: "This Mazarini is here more to spy than to negotiate....He is so Spanish and so Savoyard that what he says shouldn't be taken as gospel truth."

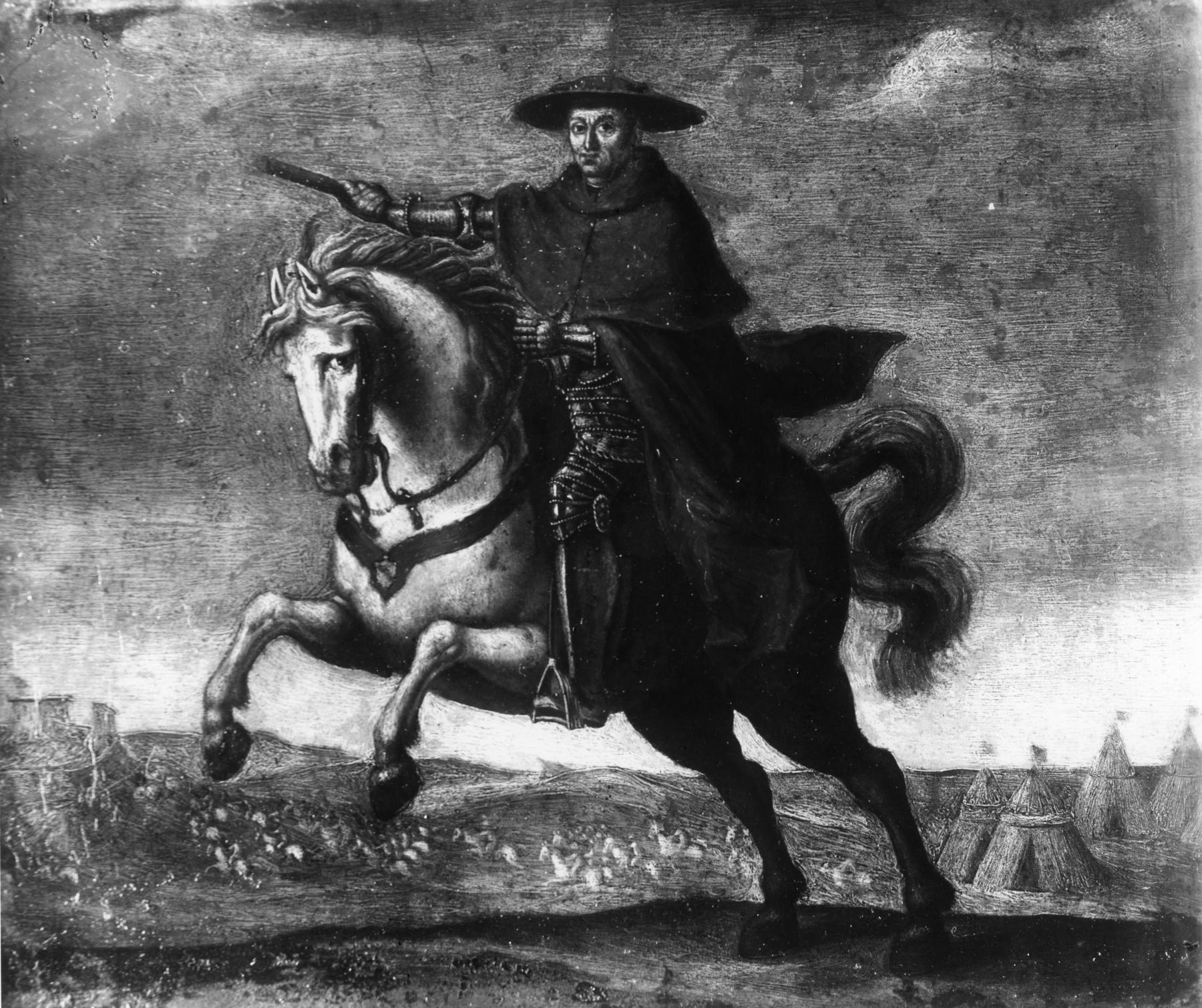
Mazarin carrying the peace agreement to the armies at Casale, crying "Peace! Peace!" (18th century engraving)

Richelieu at first decided to ignore Mazarin's diplomacy and to send the French army across the Alps into Italy. On 26 October 1630 the French and Spanish armies met outside the walls of the French-held town of Casale, ready to fight. Suddenly, a man on horseback with a flag appeared, galloping toward them, crying "Pace! Pace!" ("Peace! Peace!") It was Mazarin, carrying an agreement from the Spanish commander to evacuate their soldiers from the town if the French would leave Montferrat to Charles Gonzaga, Duke of Mantua. Mazarin brought together the Spanish and French commanders and explained the terms of the agreement, which were readily accepted by both sides. Mazarin had achieved his first diplomatic success.

The result of Mazarin's first diplomatic efforts was the Treaty of Cherasco, 6 April 1631, in which the Emperor and the Duke of Savoy recognized the possession of Mantua and part of Monferrat by Charles Gonzaga and the French occupation of the strategic stronghold of Pinerolo, the gate to the valley of the Po, to the great satisfaction of Richelieu and King Louis XIII.

The Pope sent Mazarin to Paris at the beginning of 1631 to work out the final details of the agreement. He returned to France again from April to July 1632. He had his first interview with Lous XIII and with the Queen, Anne of Austria, in May 1632. He tried to persuade Louis XIII to send a military expedition to capture Geneva, the fortress of the Protestant movement, but the King, who had good relations with the Swiss cantons, rejected the idea. Mazarin returned to Rome in November 1632, and made a new friend and ally, Antonio Barberini, the nephew of the Pope and one of his chief diplomats, and his older brother, Francesco Barberini, the Cardinal Secretary of State. With their assistance, he established himself as a guardian of French interests in Rome, and then of papal interests in France. In 1632, he was named papal vice-legate at Avignon, appointed a prelate, and began to wear ecclesiastical dress, though he was not and never became a priest.

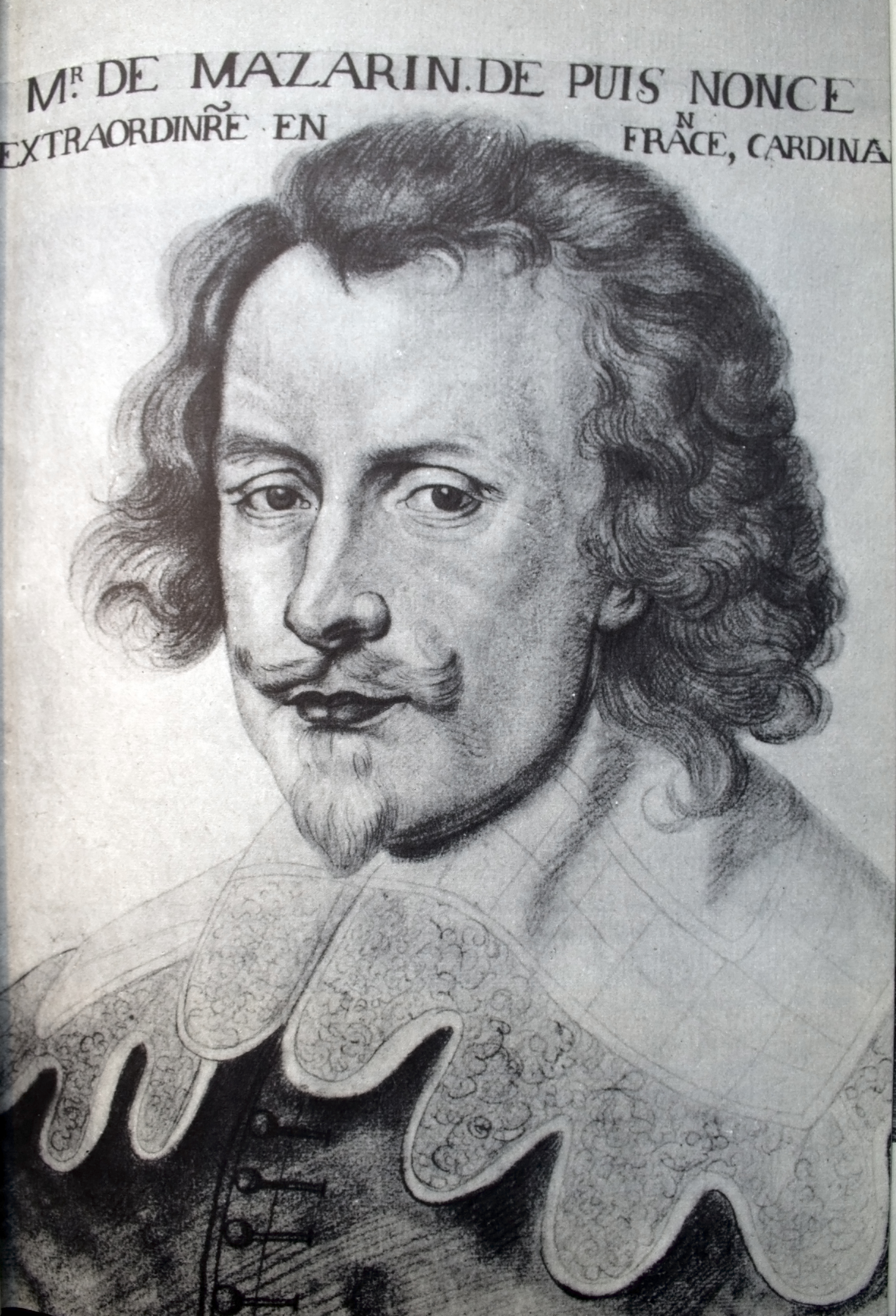
Mazarin as a papal envoy in Paris (1632)

While in Rome, Mazarin sent regular gifts of flowers, perfumes and delicacies to the women of the French court, and more valuable gifts, including statues and Renaissance paintings, to Richelieu. In 1634 he was named nuncio extraordinary to Paris by Urban VIII, and entrusted with the mission of persuading Louis XIII to undertake a grand naval crusade against the Turks. The goal was to create a combined fleet of the ships of Christian nations to seize the Turkish ports around the Mediterranean. Mazarin, a realist, knew that, given the rivalries between European powers, this project would never take place.

A new crisis arrived on 19 May 1635; France declared war on the Habsburg rulers of Austria and Spain. Mazarin wrote later that he had done his best to persuade Richelieu to avoid a war. He wrote that in March 1635 he gave Richelieu all his reasons to maintain the peace. "His Eminence told me, as he stood up," Mazarin wrote, "that I courted Peace as if she were the woman of my dreams. Then he shook my hand, and concluded, 'You are no longer on the side of France.'" Mazarin returned to Avignon on 7 April 1636.

During all of his negotiations, Mazarin was very careful not to be too critical of the French court and Richelieu, and they remained in contact. In November 1636 he left Avignon to return to Rome, carrying instructions from Richelieu that made him a discreet ambassador for the king of France.

The atmosphere within the papal curia was hostile to France and to Richelieu; Spanish priests occupied many positions in the hierarchy and they considered him, with reason, an agent of France. When the Pope refused to send him back to France, or to represent the papacy at a peace conference, he wrote: "I am not a subject of the King of France, but I believe I can truly say that the declarations of the Spanish have declared me to be French, so that with justice one can say that France is my country."

His position in Rome was increasingly difficult. He had the affection of Pope Urban VIII, but he was disliked by Cardinal Barberini, the chief of Papal diplomacy, and by the large contingent of Spaniards in the papal household. He spent his time collecting sculpture and other works of art which he sent to Richelieu for the Cardinal's new palace in Paris. He considered serving the rulers of Savoy, Poland, or Queen Henriette of England, but in the end he decided to enter the service of Richelieu and France. However, Richelieu was in no hurry to bring him to Paris; he valued the diplomatic contributions Mazarin was making in Rome, as well as the art treasures he was acquiring. He kept Mazarin in Rome for two more years. Richelieu did one important favor for Mazarin; in October 1638 he put forward Mazarin's name as a candidate for Cardinal when the next vacancy opened up. In December 1638, when a sitting Cardinal died, Mazarin was nominated as a Cardinal. He had to wait the entire year of 1639 before his new position was confirmed. Then on 14 December 1639, he departed Rome for the port of Civitavecchia, boarded an armed French ship to Marseille, and then traveled from Lyon to Paris, where he arrived on 5 January 1640.

== Cardinal and deputy of Richelieu ==
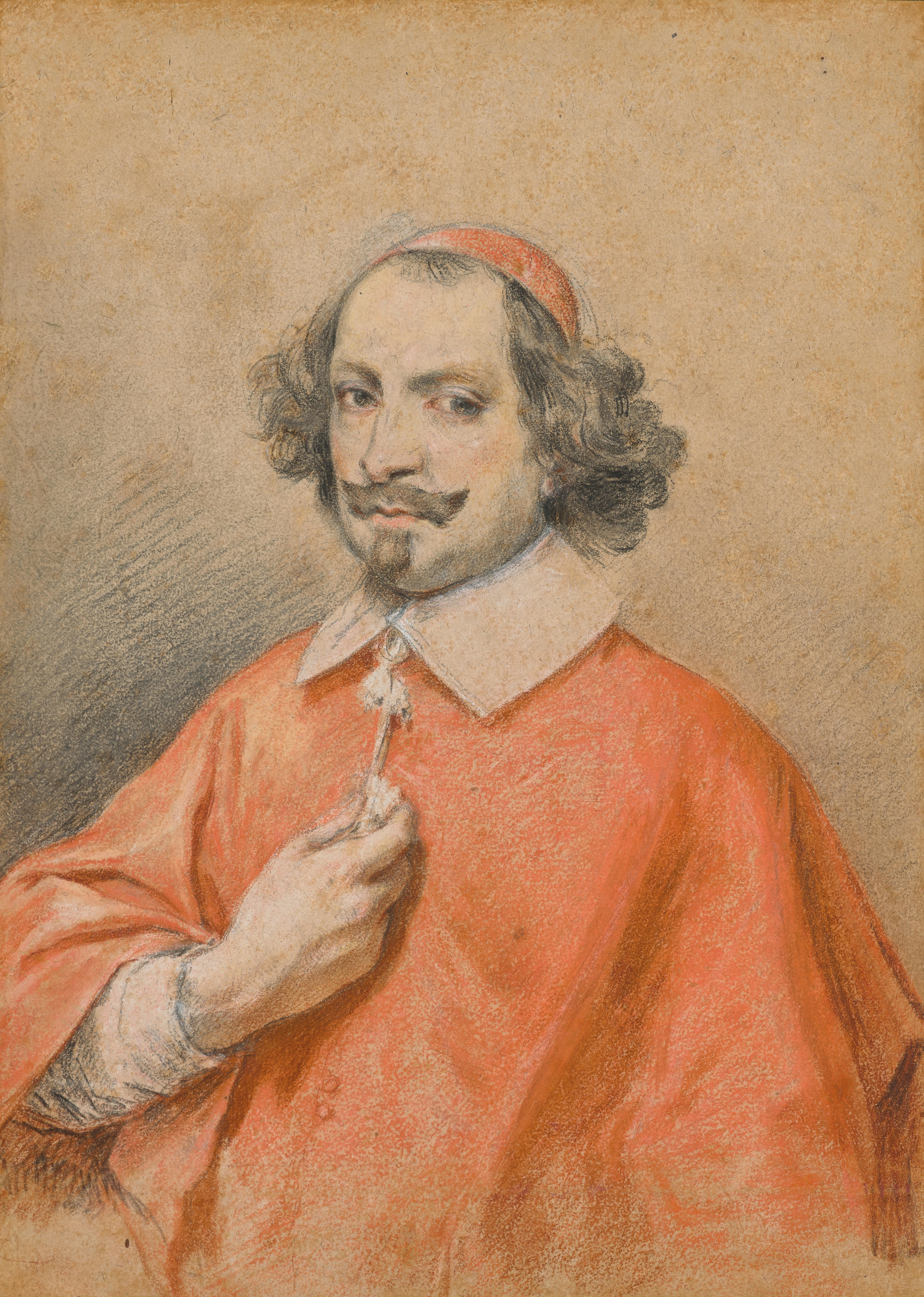
Portrait of Cardinal Jules Mazarin by Simon Vouet (before 1649, private collection)

When he arrived in Paris, Mazarin was welcomed warmly by the King, by Richelieu, and by the Queen, Anne of Austria, to whom Mazarin had regularly sent perfumes, fans, gloves and other gifts. The Queen was at this time pregnant with her second child, and it was already anticipated that she would be the regent when King Louis XIII died. Mazarin advised Richelieu on both political and cultural matters. He recommended artists to bring from Rome to Paris, and in 1640 he commissioned a bust of Richelieu from the sculptor Bernini in Rome, sending Bernini pictures of Richelieu. The bust of Richelieu arrived in August 1641. Mazarin declared that it was perfect, so lifelike that, as he wrote, "it seemed about to speak", but French tastes did not approve of the Baroque style. The other members of the Court condemned the work, and Mazarin wrote back to Bernini, sending him more pictures of Richelieu and asking him to try again.

Richelieu sent Mazarin on several delicate diplomatic missions, including a long trip to Savoy to straighten out the tangled political affairs there: the regency of Christine, the Duchess of Savoy, and sister of Louis XIII, was challenged by her brothers-in-law, the princes Maurice and Thomas of Savoy. (See Piedmontese Civil War) Mazarin successfully secured Christine's position, and established a solid alliance between Savoy and France. This task kept him away from Paris for nine months, until June 1641. On 16 December 1641, though he had not reached his fortieth birthday, he received what he most desired, he was formally made a Cardinal.

He had established a cordial relationship with Richelieu; Richelieu jokingly referred to him as Rinzama (an anagram of his name), or Nunzinicardo ("dear little envoy"), or, most frequently, Colmarduccio, or Colmardo. When was asked what it meant, he translated into French as Frère Coupechou, the term for a junior candidate monk who was assigned to chop cabbage in the kitchen of the abbey. However, he did not send Mazarin on the mission that he most wanted, as delegate of France to a Europe-wide peace conference. Richelieu's attention was devoted to making war; Richelieu, who was elderly and in poor health, took the King, who was also in poor health, the court and Mazarin on a series of long military expeditions, to suppress a rebellion in Catalonia, to capture Roussillon, and, in January 1642, to lay siege to Narbonne.

On 11 June 1642, while in Tarascon on one of the long military expeditions, Mazarin was presented with evidence that Gaston, Duke of Orléans, the brother of Louis XIII, and the Marquis of Cinq-Mars, one of the King's closest advisors, had made a secret agreement with the King of Spain, without the knowledge of Richelieu or the King. It appeared probable that the Queen, Anne of Austria, was also aware of this secret betrayal of Richelieu, but did not tell him or the King. Cinq-Mars was arrested, Gaston was disgraced, and another conspirator, the Duke of Bouillon, was granted a pardon on the condition of revealing all the details of the plot to Mazarin, and surrendering the important fortress of Sedan to the King. Mazarin did not reveal the participation of the Queen in the conspiracy, but his knowledge gave him even greater leverage at the court. The destruction of the conspiracy against the King was one of the last acts of Cardinal Richelieu. He fell ill and died on 4 December 1642.

== Chief minister of France – Diplomacy ==
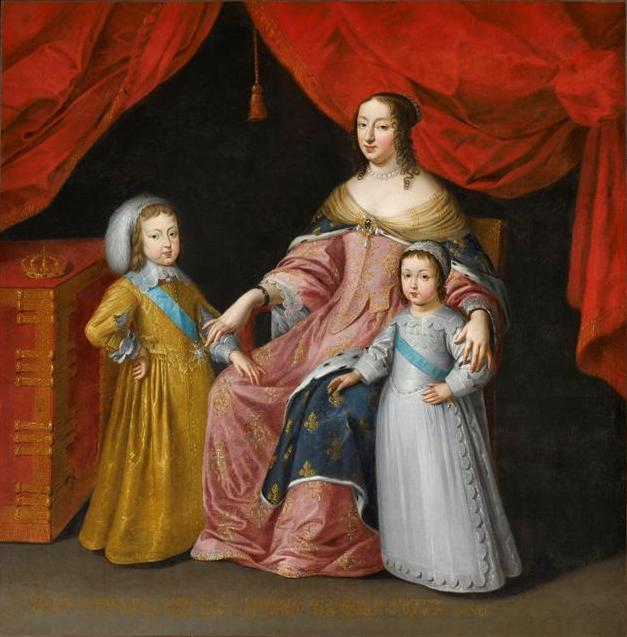
Anne of Austria with her children Louis XIV and Philippe of Orleans (unknown artist)

The succession of Mazarin to the position of chief minister of Louis XIII was not automatic or immediate. Despite the accounts of some later historians, Richelieu did not name Mazarin as his successor. Richelieu did, according to Mazarin himself, advise the King to employ Mazarin, who until that time had no official position at court.

After the death of Richelieu, Louis XIII named three prominent figures to advise him; François Sublet de Noyers, Léon Bouthillier, comte de Chavigny and Mazarin. Mazarin and de Chavigny immediately joined together to get rid of de Noyers. They hinted to the King that de Noyers had secretly made an agreement with Anne of Austria to make her the regent of France after the King's death. The King, who had little love for the Queen and in his will had refused to make her his regent, was furious; de Noyers was forced to resign on 10 April 1643.

Louis XIII died 14 May 1643, just five months after Richelieu. His successor, Louis XIV, was just four years old. The King had specifically instructed that his wife, Anne of Austria, not rule in his place as regent. However, as soon as he was dead, she applied to the body of nobles known as the Parlement of Paris, and had his will annulled. She was declared Regent on 18 May. The Queen had a particular dislike of de Chavigny, the other chief advisor chosen by Louis XIII. He had been close to Richelieu and was the only real rival in experience to Mazarin. The evening that she became regent, she declared that Mazarin would be her chief minister and head of her government.

The management style of Mazarin was entirely different from that of Richelieu. The contrast was described by Cardinal Retz, the future enemy of Mazarin, in his Memoires: "One saw on the steps of the throne, where the sharp and fearsome Richelieu had thundered rather than governed the people, a leader who is gentle, benevolent, and demands nothing...He has the spirit, the insinuation, the playfulness, the manners, but also a certain laziness...."

Cardinal Retz and other rivals in the court underestimated Mazarin's skills, energy and determination. Mazarin continued Richelieu's costly war against the chief rivals of France in Europe, the Habsburgs of Austria and Spain. The victories of Condé and Turenne finally brought Austria to the bargaining table and ended the Thirty Years' War with the Peace of Westphalia (1646–48).

Mazarin's policies also added Alsace (though not Strasbourg) to France. He settled Protestant princes in secularized bishoprics and abbacies in reward for their political opposition to the Habsburgs, building a network of French influence as a buffer in the western part of the Empire. In 1657, he made an attempt to get Louis XIV elected as Holy Roman Emperor. In 1658 he formed the League of the Rhine, which was designed to check the House of Austria in central Germany. In 1659 he made peace with Habsburg Spain in the Peace of the Pyrenees, which added to French territory Roussillon and northern Cerdanya—as French Cerdagne—in the far south as well as part of the Low Countries.

Towards Protestantism at home, Mazarin pursued a policy of promises and calculated delay to defuse the armed insurrection of the Ardèche (1653), for example, and to keep the Huguenots disarmed: for six years they believed themselves to be on the eve of recovering the protections of the Edict of Nantes, but in the end they obtained nothing.

There was constant friction with the pontificate of the Spanish Cardinal Pamphili, elected pope on 15 September 1644 as Innocent X. Mazarin protected the Barberini cardinals, nephews of the late pope, and the bull against them was voted by the Parlement of Paris "null and abusive"; France made a show of preparing to take Avignon by force, and Innocent backed down. Mazarin was more consistently an enemy of Jansenism, in particular during the formulary controversy, more for its political implications than out of theology. On his deathbed he warned young Louis XIV "not to tolerate the Jansenist sect, not even their name." After his death, Louis XIV did not appoint a new principal minister and instead governed himself, marking the beginning of a new era of centralized government in France.

== Discontent – The Fronde (1648–1653) ==
Mazarin's long war against the Habsburgs, the final part of the Thirty Years' War, was successful, but the cost was enormous. Resentment grew against the Spanish Queen and her Italian prime minister, and culminated in the Fronde, a rebellion against the government by members of the nobility and discontented citizens of Paris, which lasted from 1648 until 1653.

Mazarin was forced to raise money by any means possible to support the war against the Habsburgs. His financial counselor was Michel Particelli d'Émery, also Italian. When taxes, loans, and the sale of titles did not bring in enough, he sought new sources of income. He discovered an old law dating to Henry IV which forbade Parisians to build houses outside the city limits. Since the city had grown well outside its old boundaries, in 1644 he imposed heavy fines on all those who lived outside the city limits. In addition, he taxed all merchandise being brought into the city. One measure caused particular resentment among the nobility; he imposed a special tax on all the nobles who served on the various royal courts and councils, amounting to four years of their fees.

=== The Fronde of the Parliament ===
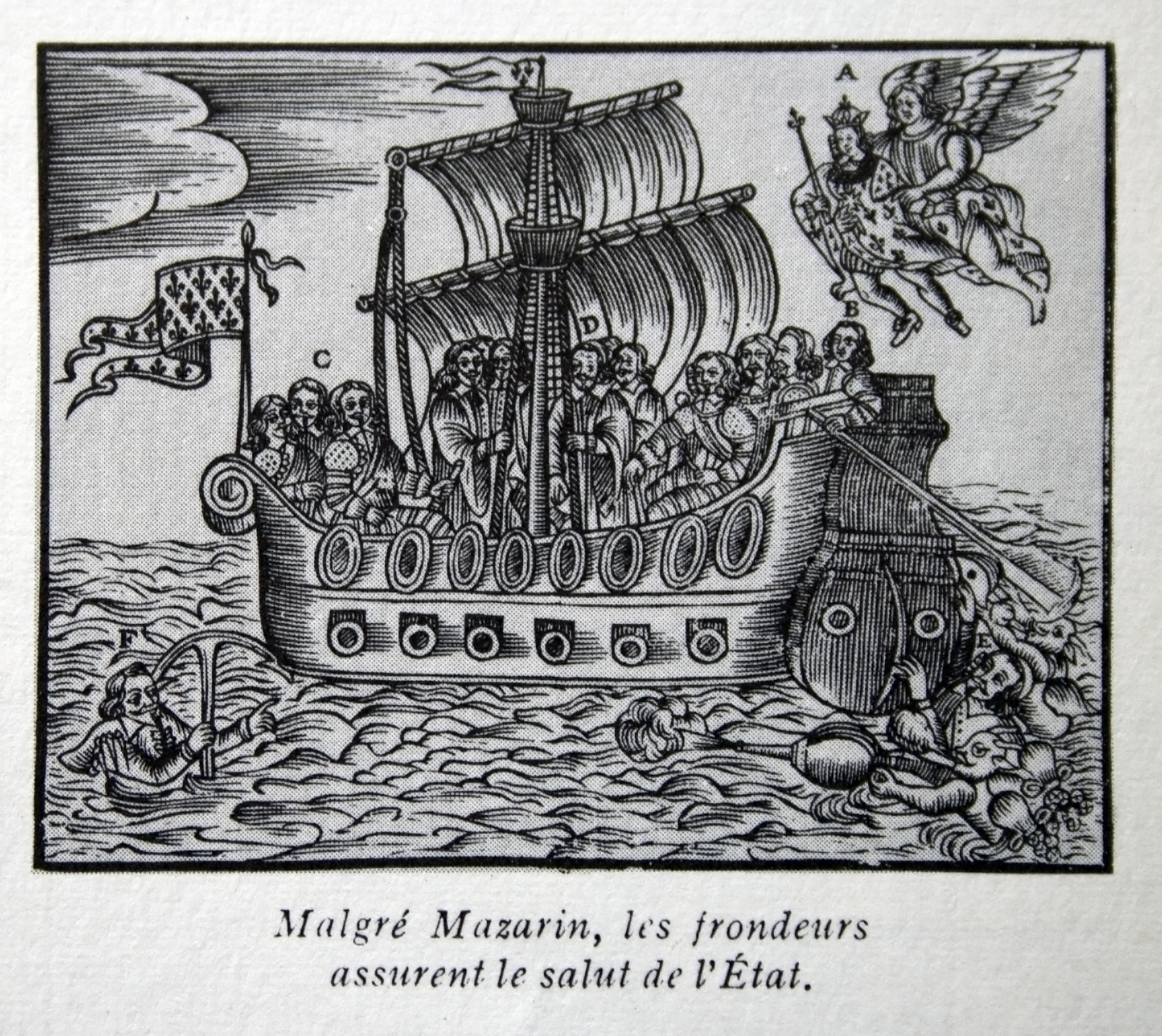
An anti-Mazarin cartoon from the Fronde (about 1650). The caption reads, "Despite Mazarin, the frondeurs assure the safety of the state."

The center of resistance was the Paris parlement, an ancient assembly of nobles which served as a high court of appeals. It was a period of rebellion against monarchs across Europe; independence movements appeared in the Spanish provinces of Catalonia and Portugal, a revolutionary seized power in Naples, and Charles I of England, the brother-in-law of Louis XIII, was deposed and executed in 1649. In Paris, the members of the parlement called a special session to debate Mazarin's measures. The meeting was forbidden by Regent, Anne of Austria, but went ahead anyway. The parlement issued a charter, inspired by the writ of Habeas Corpus in England, which revoked the authority of the King's justice officials, forbade any new taxes without the approval of the parlement, and declared that no royal subjects could be imprisoned without due process of law.

Mazarin recommended to the Queen that she listen to the parlement and modify her decrees, but she was furious at their opposition. She waited until the right moment to strike back. The occasion she chose was the celebration of a major victory of the French Army over the Spanish at the Battle of Lens in Belgium on 26 August 1648. On the day that a special mass was held at the Cathedral of Notre Dame de Paris to celebrate the victory, she gave orders to the Captain of her guards to arrest the leaders of the parlement, including the popular Pierre Broussel. News of the arrest quickly spread in Paris, and crowds came out into the street to protest and to build barricades. That evening Mazarin wrote in his journal, "the parlement has performed the functions of the King, and the people have deferred to it entirely."

During the Fronde, the anti-Mazarin crowds of Paris enjoyed listening to Mazarinades, popular songs with verses mocking the Cardinal. Dozens were written and published, accusing him of virtually all possible faults and crimes. Mazarin had a sense of humor, and when the Fronde was finished, he had the best Mazarinades collected and performed in a concert at his palace.

The rebellion lasted for three years. It took its popular name, Fronde, from the children's slings (frondes) which were used by the mobs in the Paris streets to hurl stones. It combined the anger of the Parisians against the new taxes with the resentment of the nobility against the reduction of their ancient privileges. It was led over time by an odd assortment of allies; Gaston d'Orleans, the brother of Louis XIII; Louis II de Bourbon, Prince de Condé a brilliant general but poor politician, and the Cardinal Paul de Gondi, a consummate intriguer. Each of them had different goals, but all agreed that Mazarin should fall.

When the Fronde began, the French Army, commanded by the Prince de Condé was far from Paris, fighting the Austrians. Mazarin quickly sent an envoy to the Emperor in Vienna, calling for a truce and peace conference. The Peace of Westphalia, ending the war, was signed 24 October 1648. Despite the peace, disturbances continued in the streets of Paris. During the night of January 6, 1649, Mazarin secretly took the young Louis XIV, Anne of Austria and the court to the safety of the Château de Saint-Germain-en-Laye, just west of Paris. Mazarin then set to work intriguing to divide the different factions of the Fronde. His goal was to separate the members of the Parlement and the more radical Parisian street demonstrators, who were united only by their dislike of Mazarin and Anne of Austria.

As soon as the war was concluded, he brought Condé and his army back to Paris and placed the city under blockade. He then persuaded the Parlement that they had more to fear from an uprising of the Parisiens than they did from him. On 14 March 1649 Mazarin accepted many of the reforms demanded by the Parlement. In return, the Parlement supporters laid down their weapons and allowed Anne of Austria, the young Louis XIV and Mazarin to return to Paris.

=== The Fronde of the Princes ===
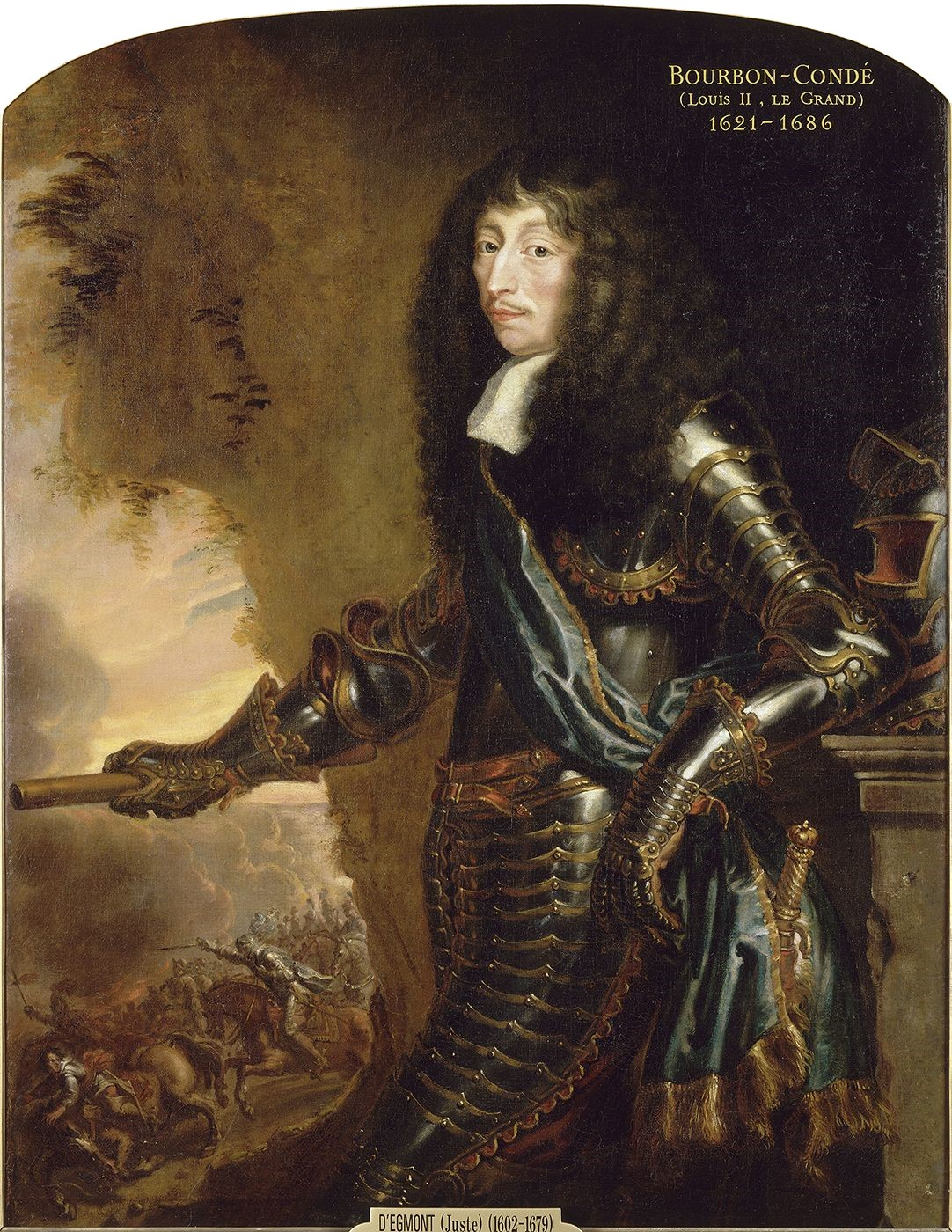
Louis the Prince de Condé, leader of the second Fronde

The Parlement accepted Mazarin and his government, but the Fronde was still not finished. Many frondeurs were unhappy with the compromise reached in 1649. Once in Paris, Condé made endless demands on Anne of Austria until she finally angrily dismissed him. One of the other leaders of the Fronde, Jean François Paul de Gondi, soon persuaded Condé to join him in bringing down both Mazarin and Anne of Austria. Mazarin had an excellent network of agents, and immediately learned of the plot. On 18 January 1650 Mazarin had Condé, Condé's brother, Armand de Bourbon, prince de Conti and his brother-in-law, Henri II d'Orléans, duc de Longueville arrested.

The agreements of 1649 had brought peace to Paris, but the unrest of the Fronde continued in other parts of France. Opponents of Mazarin disrupted tax collection and administration. As the rebellion grew, Mazarin observed that the rebels were only united in opposition to him. He decided it was wisest to resign his position and leave France while he could. He had Condé freed from prison, and, after a long journey to different cities, settled in Brühl near Cologne, as the guest of the Archbishop-Elector of Cologne.

From Germany, he sent daily instructions to Anne of Austria and to his agents in France. The strategy was to sow distrust among the different factions of the Fronde. Mazarin's instructions were carried out meticulously by Anne of Austria. His intrigues succeeded in preventing the proposed marriage between one of the leading Frondeurs, the Armand de Bourbon, Prince of Conti with Princess Charlotte-Marie of Lorraine, Mademoiselle de Chevreuse, another of his principal enemies in Paris. He was greatly aided by the political ineptitude of Condé, who offended many of his natural allies. Mazarin urged Anne of Austria to bring him back to Paris as soon as possible, "to correct the greatest attack ever made against the royal authority".

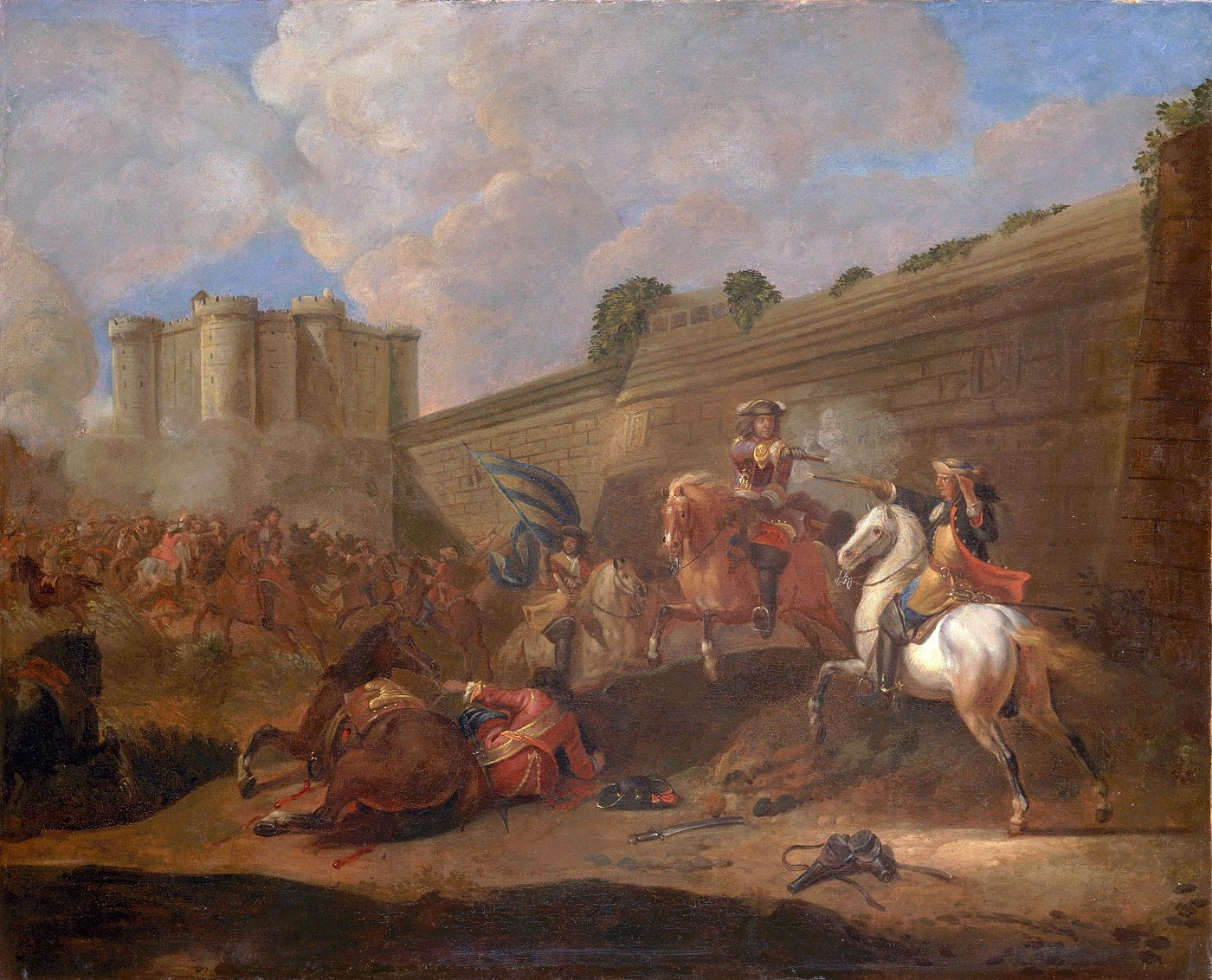
Battle between the Fronde forces of the Prince de Conde and the army loyal to Anne of Austria and Mazarin

Once back in Paris, Mazarin soon made an alliance with his old enemy, Cardinal Jean François Paul de Gondi. Condé departed to Bordeaux to gather reinforcements. He raised an army of Spanish and French soldiers, and marched on Paris, arriving on 2 July. The soldiers loyal to the Queen, commanded by Turenne, were waiting, and trapped Condé's army against the walls of Paris. An ally of Condé, the Grande Mademoiselle, ordered the gates of the city opened to rescue Condé's army. The battle was witnessed from the hills of Charonne by the young Louis XIV.

As soon as Condé's soldiers entered Paris, he demanded an immediate purge of Mazarin's supporters. Riots broke out around the Bastille, and were suppressed with great difficulty. The Presidents of the Parlement, now allies of Mazarin, demanded that the violence be stopped and that Condé take his army out of Paris. Reluctantly, Condé left the city, going to the Spanish Netherlands, pursued by Turenne.

Louis XIV, now of age to claim his throne, re-entered Paris in October 1652, accompanied by his mother and by Turenne. Mazarin had to wait longer to make his return, which was carefully orchestrated with his help. The Parlement de Paris was first transferred by Anne of Austria from Paris to Pontoise, to see how many members would accept her authority. A majority appeared at the meeting. Following the prepared plan, the Parlement respectfully asked that Mazarin be dismissed, and Anne of Austria agreed. Mazarin, knowing this was the plan, accepted this decision, and waited a respectful time in exile. He made his return to Paris in February 1653. He was welcomed with a triumphal banquet at the Hotel de Ville, where crowds earlier had demanded his downfall.

Once he was restored to power, Mazarin began arranging for his nieces, known as the Mazarinettes, to marry powerful French and Italian noblemen. In order to entice the prospective grooms to marry them despite their lower rank, Mazarin provided large dowries. Among his seven nieces, Laura Mancini and Anne Marie Martinozzi married into the royal House of Bourbon; Olympia Mancini married into the House of Savoy; and Laura Martinozzi married Duke Alfonso IV d'Este of Modena.

== Financing the Kingdom – Fouquet and Colbert ==
Finding money was a primary preoccupation for Mazarin throughout his entire time as first minister. His new taxes on Parisians and the nobility had provoked the first Fronde, but the end of the Fronde did not resolve the problem. The government had borrowed huge amounts to finance the campaigns against the first Fronde and against Condé, and also had to pay for the continual travels of the Regent and the young King, and the elaborate festivities, parades, and cavalcades that accompanied their travel and every major event. The royal budget for 1653 was about 109 million livres, which amounted to eight hundred tons of silver or sixty tons of gold. Expenditures were the greatest between 1656 and 1659. Twenty-seven agreements were made with bankers, who loaned the government 98 million livres to supplement the money collected through ordinary taxes.

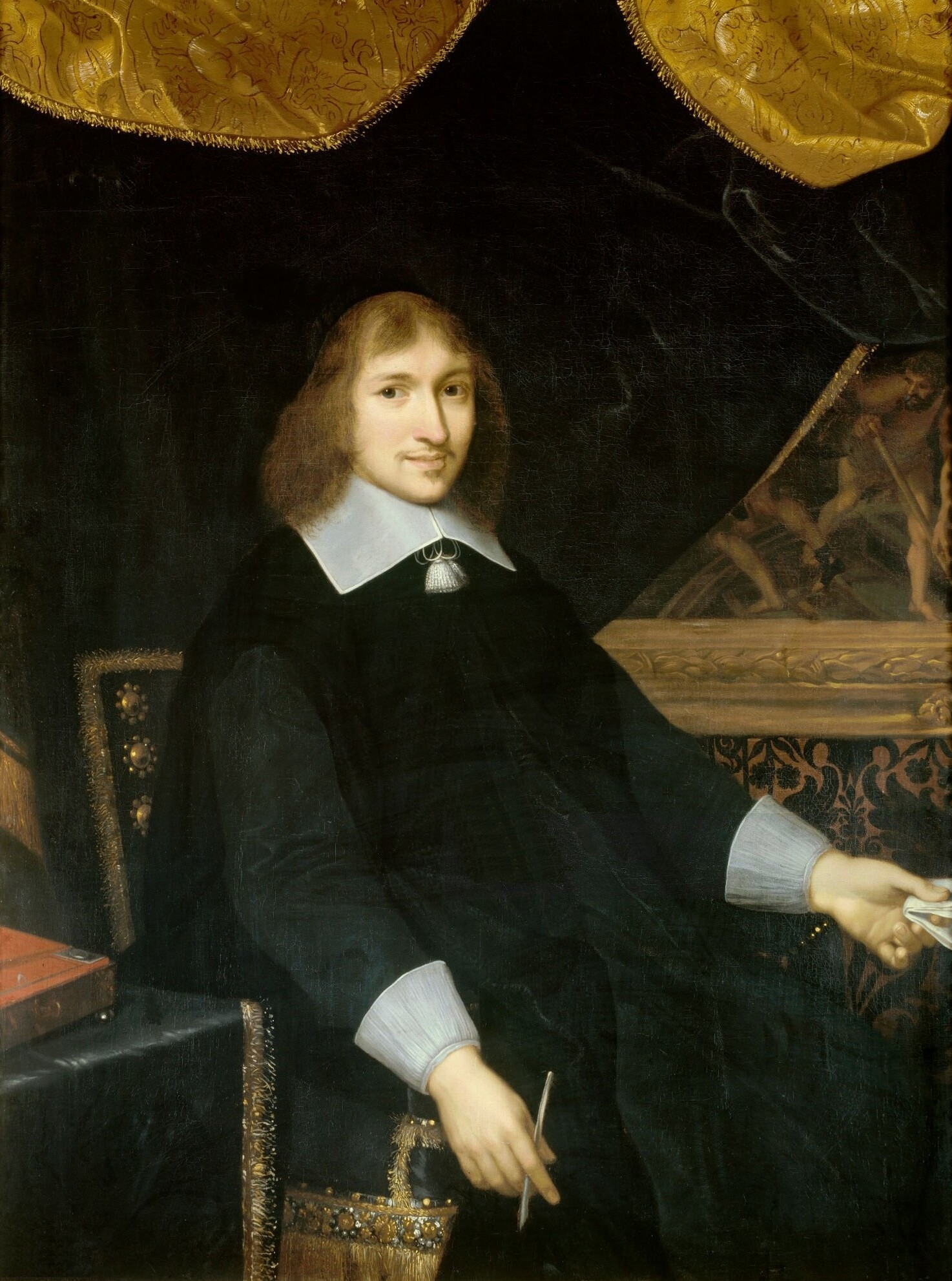
Nicolas Fouquet, the Superintendent of Finances

Following the death of his first finance minister, La Vieuville, on 2 February 1653, Mazarin chose a new minister, Nicolas Fouquet. At the age of twenty-five, Fouquet had inherited a very large fortune after the death of his young first wife, and an even greater fortune when he married the second time, to Marie-Madeleine de Castille, whose family was one of the wealthiest in Europe. Fouquet began as a master of receipts at age twenty, then an intendant to the army, then Procuror-General for the Parlement of Paris at the age of thirty-five.

Through his family connections, Fouquet had amassed a fortune of three to four million livres. One of the reasons for Fouquet's rapid rise was his willingness to lend very large sums to Mazarin for his various projects. In November 1657 Mazarin needed 11.8 million livres to pay the Army of the North. Fouquet, drawing upon his wealthy relatives, was able to provide the money. In 1659 he provided another loan of five million livres.

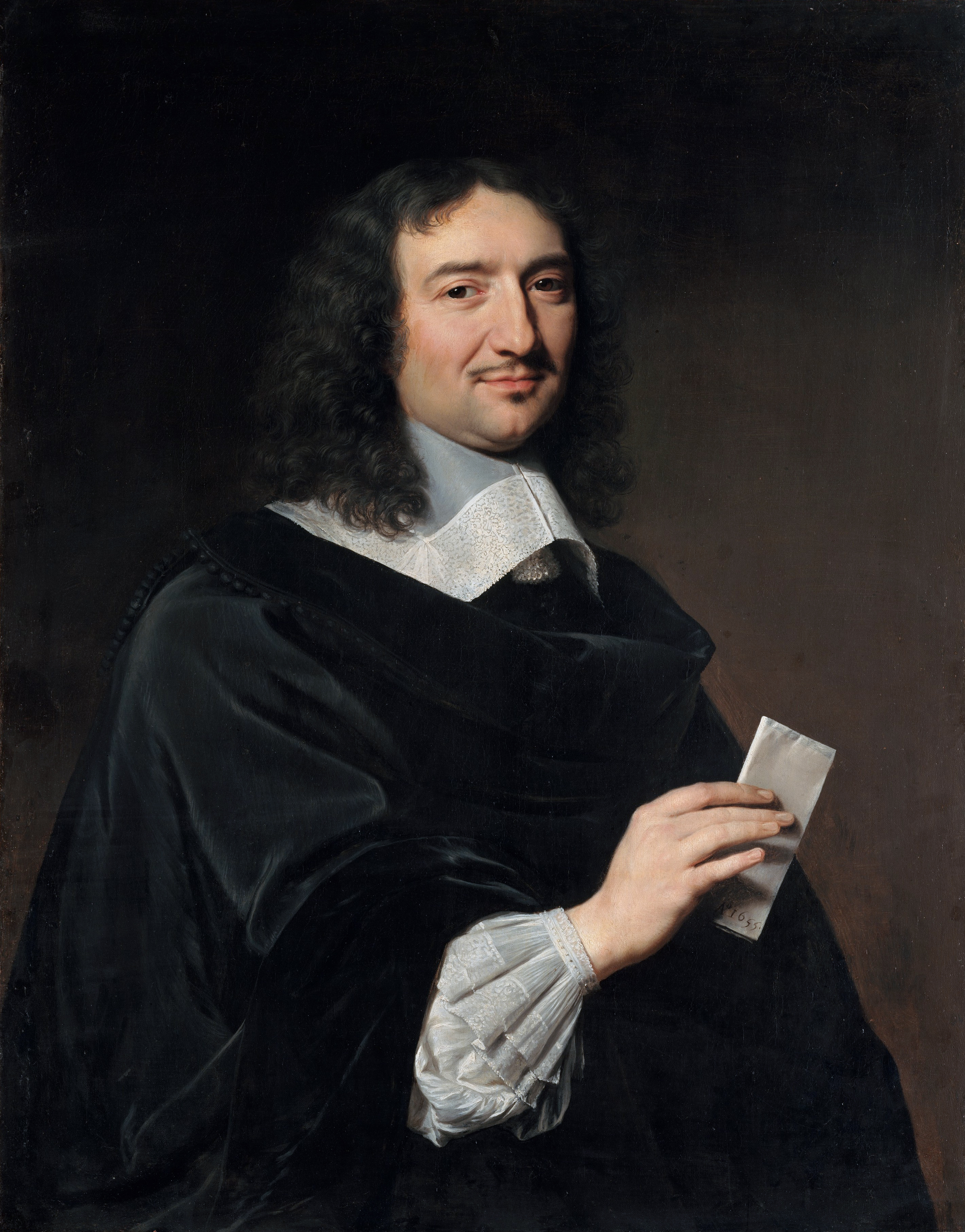
Jean-Baptiste Colbert, the enemy and successor of Fouquet

One effect of the enormous amount of money in the market during the period of the Regency of Anne of Austria and Mazarin was a decline in the value of the Livre tournois, the French royal unit of account, which lost twenty percent of its value against the gold Florentine Florin coin. However, without the money lent by Fouquet and other aristocratic financiers, Louis XIV could never have accomplished his early military and diplomatic successes.

The great rival of Fouquet was Jean-Baptiste Colbert, who was also recommended to Louis XIV and brought into the government by Mazarin. Soon after he became an assistant to Mazarin, he wrote a mémoire to Mazarin, claiming that of the taxes paid by the people, not one-half reached the King. The paper also accused Fouquet of using royal funds for his own enrichment. Mazarin did not defend Fouquet; shortly before his own death, he agreed that Fouquet had to go. Shortly after Mazarin's death, Fouquet was accused by Colbert of misuse of state funds, his property was confiscated, and he was put into prison until his death, with Colbert eventually taking his place.

== Personal wealth and purchase of titles ==
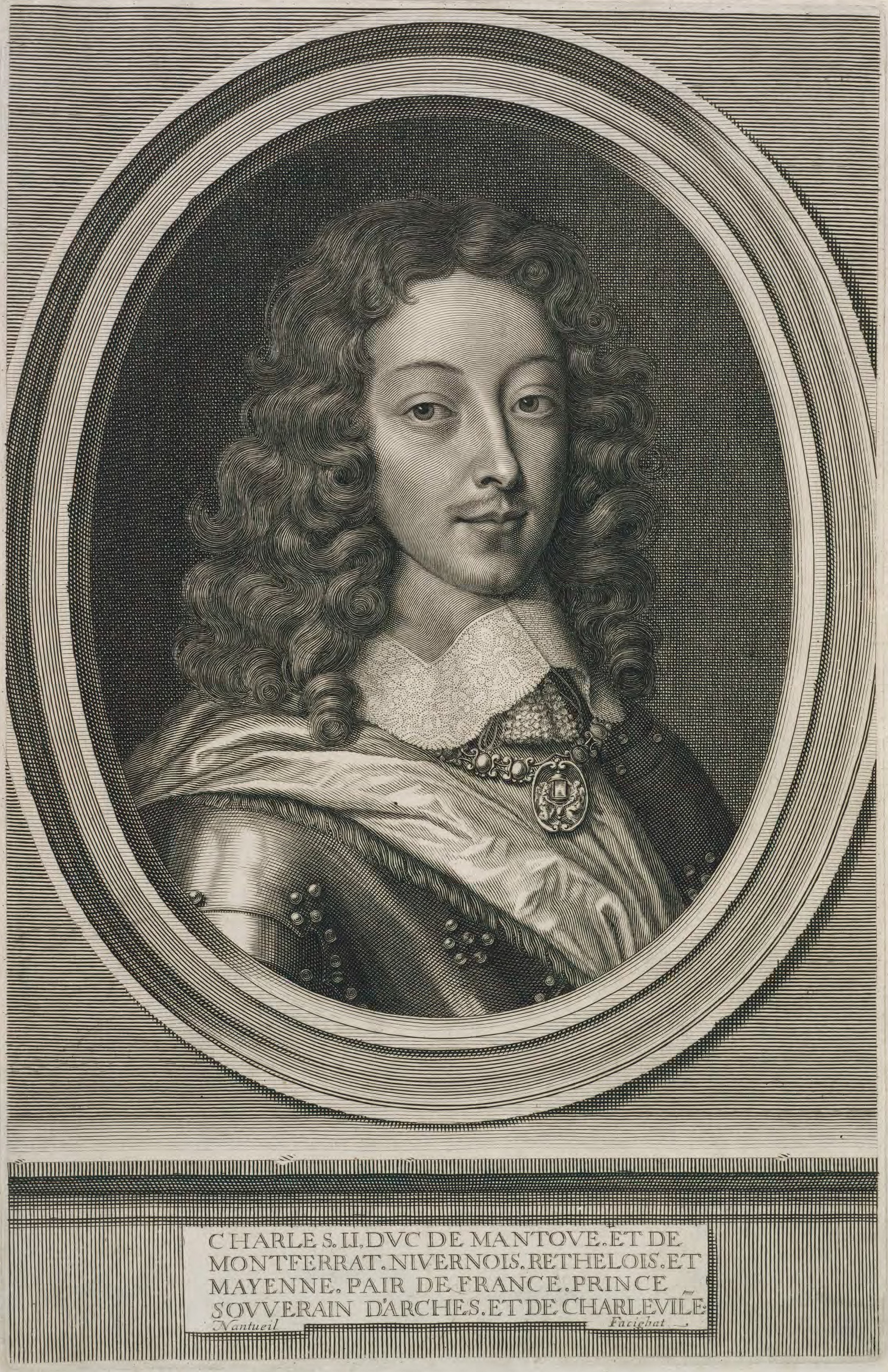
Charles Gonzaga, Duke of Mayenne and of Nevers

In 1645, Marie Louise Gonzaga, the aunt of Charles Gonzaga, Duke of Mantua, had been granted in marriage to Władysław IV of Poland. She and her family did not have enough money to pay the agreed upon dowry of 2,100,000 livres. As a result, they went deeply in debt to Louis XIV, and their duchies of Mayenne, Nevers, and Rethel were mortgaged for this purpose. The negotiations, begun by Chancellor Séguier, were taken over by Mazarin, probably because Séguier was unable to put together enough money. Through various machinations, Mazarin and Colbert were eventually able to force Charles to pay off these debts by selling to Mazarin in 1654, the duchy of Mayenne (for 756,000 livres), and in 1659, that of Nevers (valued at 1,800,000 livres, at a discount of 1,534,675 livres), as well as the duchies of Donzy and Rethel. Thus, on 18 October 1660, less than five months before his death, Mazarin was confirmed by letters patent, issued by the young Louis XIV, as duke and peer of France.

The personal fortune of Mazarin at the time of his death was immense, amounting to 35 million livres, not counting the sums he left to his nieces. It exceeded the second-greatest personal fortune of the century, that of Richelieu, worth some 20 million livres. About one third of the personal fortune of Mazarin came from some twenty-one abbeys around France, each of which paid him an annual share of their revenue. Unlike members of the nobility, he did not have any large estates; his only real estate was the palace in Paris which he purchased in 1649, and added several surrounding houses. It was valued at 1.2 million livres. Thirty-seven percent of his fortune was in easily transportable jewels and cash. Within the ebony cabinets of his rooms at the Louvre his heirs found 450 pearls of high quality, plus quantities of gold chains and crosses, and rings with precious stones, altogether adding another 400,000 livres. He left to his family jewels worth an estimated 2.5 million livres, and gave a collection of diamonds worth 50,000 livres to the new Queen, and a 14-carat diamond called The Rose of England, valued at 73,000 livres, to the Queen Mother. The most valuable legacies of all, including a set of eighteen diamonds known as the "Mazarins", worth two million livres, were given to the young Louis XIV.

== Patron of the arts ==
Mazarin was second only to Louis XIV as a patron of the arts in France in the 17th century. In 1648 he founded the Royal Academy of Painting and Sculpture. After his death in 1661, the inventory of his art collection at the Mazarin Palace recorded 858 paintings, 128 statues, 185 busts, plus 150 carpets, 514 pieces of jewelry and fine silver, and 317 precious stones, not counting the famous Mazarin diamonds, which he left to Louis XIV. His collection included works by most of the major French and Italian artists of his time and before, going back to the Renaissance. His acquisitions included works by Poussin, Rubens, Corregio, Van Dyck, Titian, and many others, as well as the famous Portrait of Baldassare Castiglione by Raphael, which had belonged to Charles I of England, and had been bought by Richelieu. Just before his death, he visited his gallery for the last time with his deputy Brienne, and told him: "Ah, my poor friend, I must leave all this. Farewell, dear paintings, which cost me so much and which I so much loved." Many of the paintings he owned are now in the Louvre.

Mazarin's art collection

Portrait of Baldassare Castiglione, by Raphael

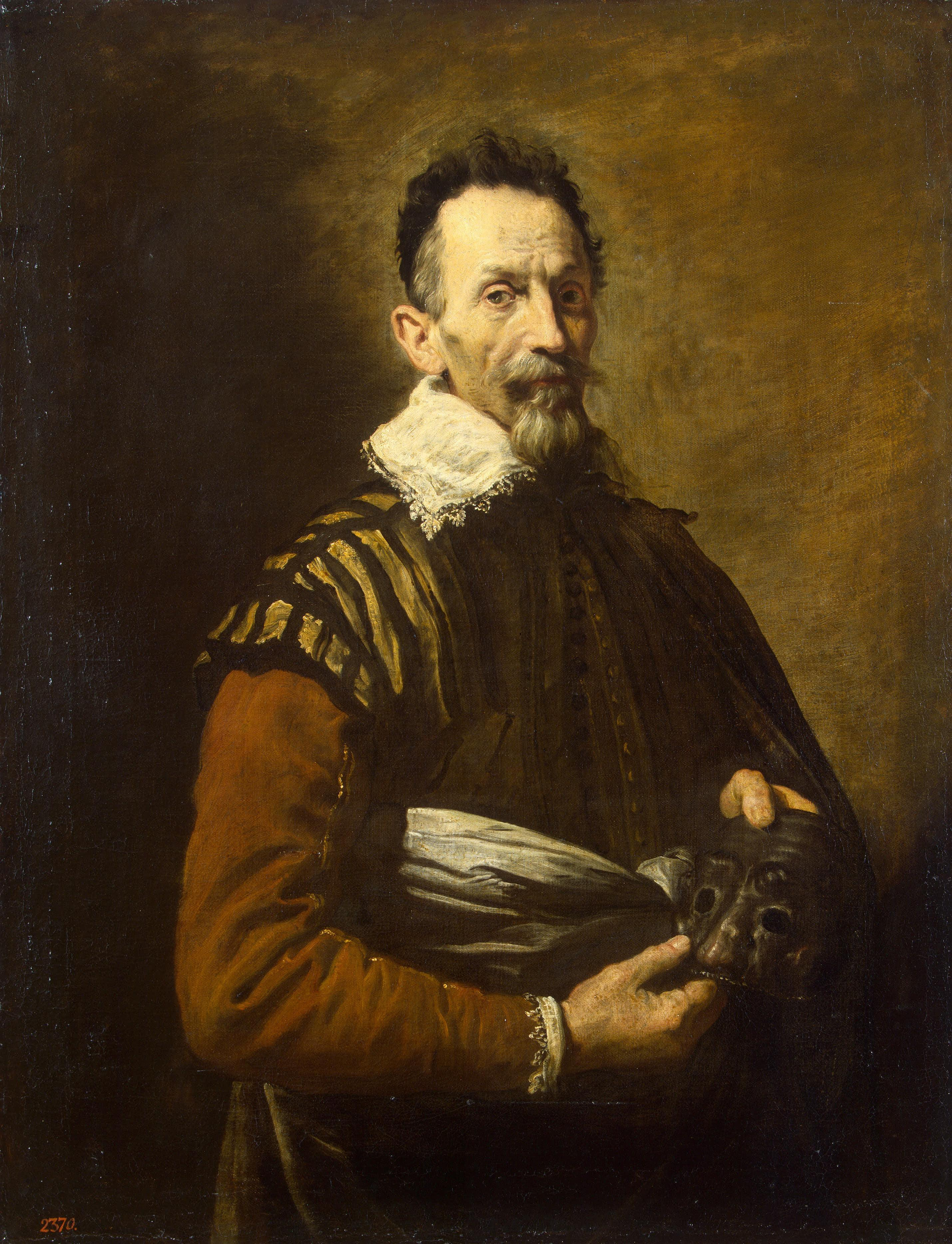
Portrait of an Actor by Domenico Feti

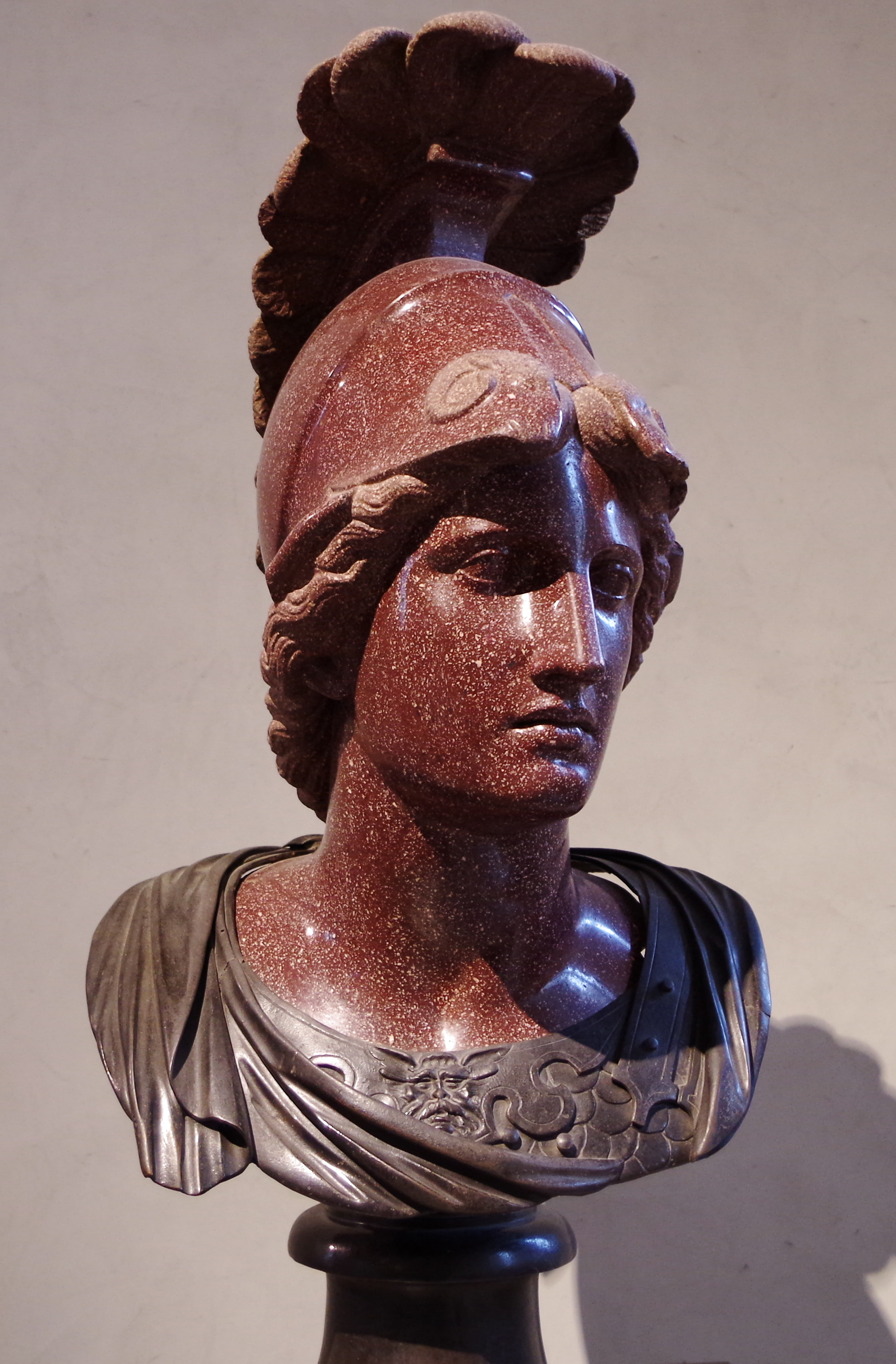
Minerve

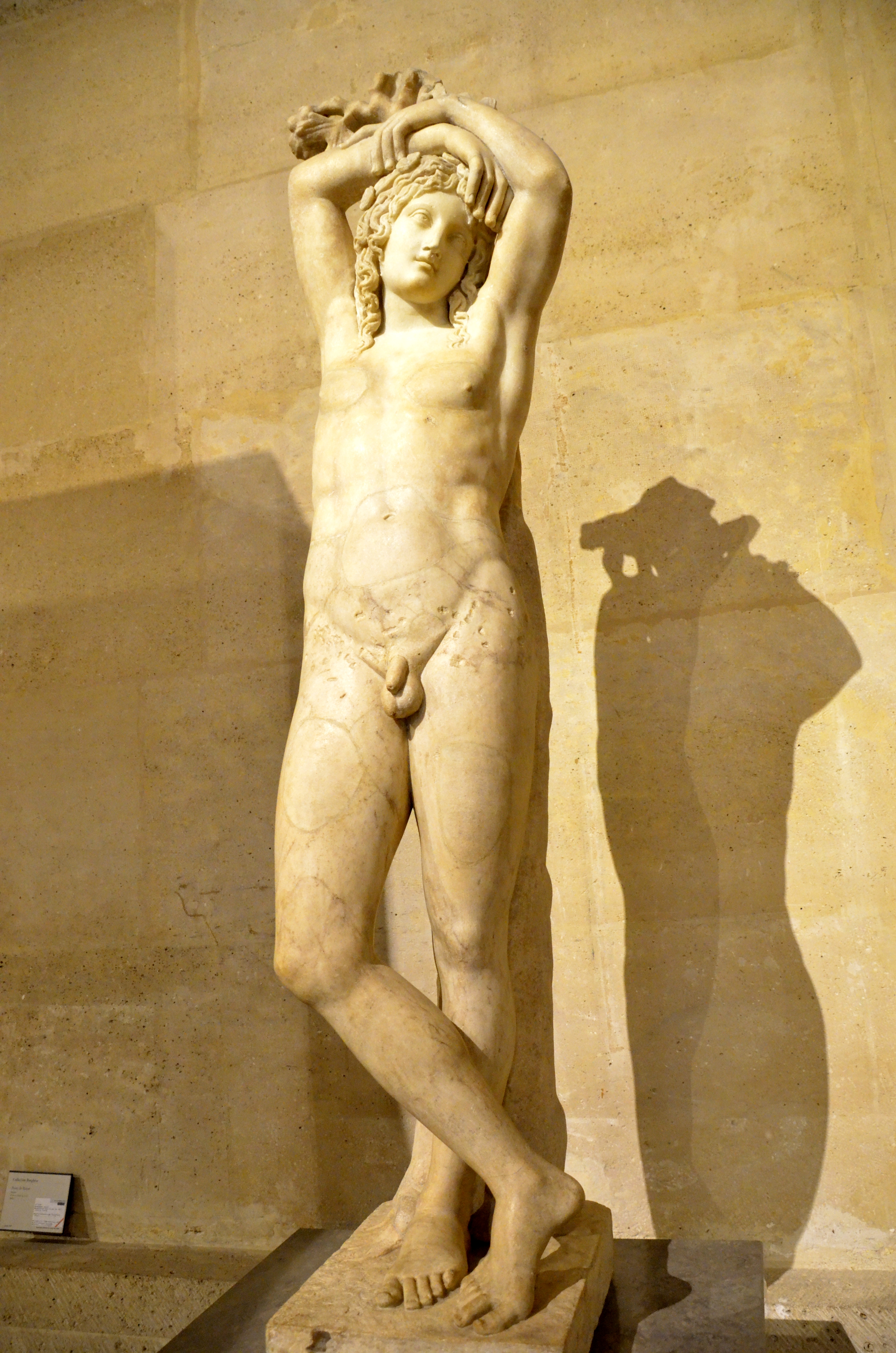
Narcissus

The Palais Mazarin (Mazarin Palace) was created by Mazarin beginning in 1643, soon after he became first minister, when he rented four adjacent hôtels on the north side of the Rue Neuve-des-Petits-Champs between the Rue Vivienne to the east and the Rue de Richelieu on the west and across from the Palais Royal, which was the King's residence. He commissioned François Mansart to add a garden wing with two superimposed galleries running north from the west end of the easternmost building, the Hôtel Tubeuf, where he could display his art collection, including paintings and antique sculpture. Between 1645 and 1647 he commissioned the Italian painter Giovanni Francesco Romanelli to create scenes from the works of Ovid on the ceiling of the upper gallery (although much modified, now known as the Galerie Mazarine).

Galerie Mazarine

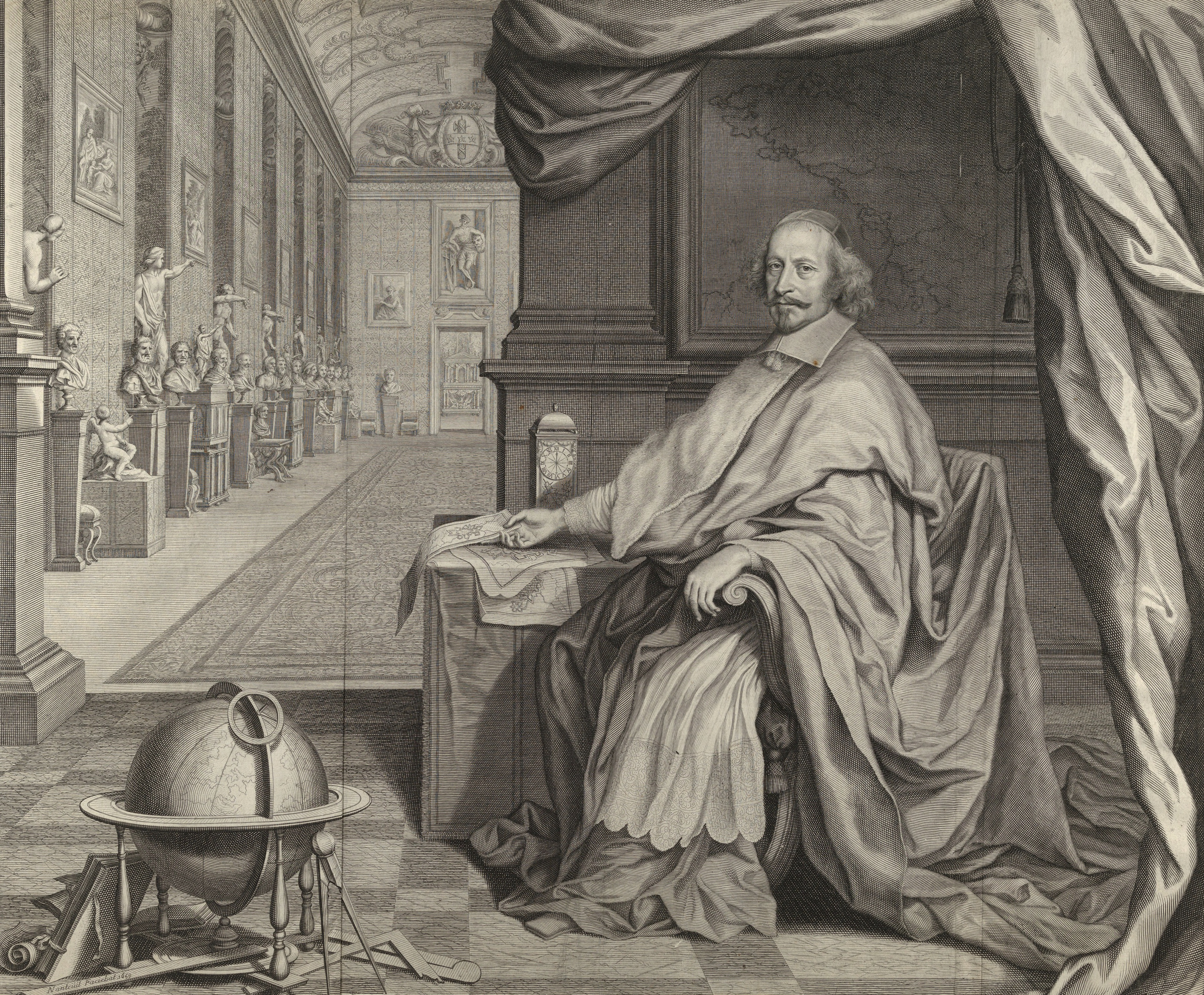
Mazarin seated within the gallery of his Palace (1659)

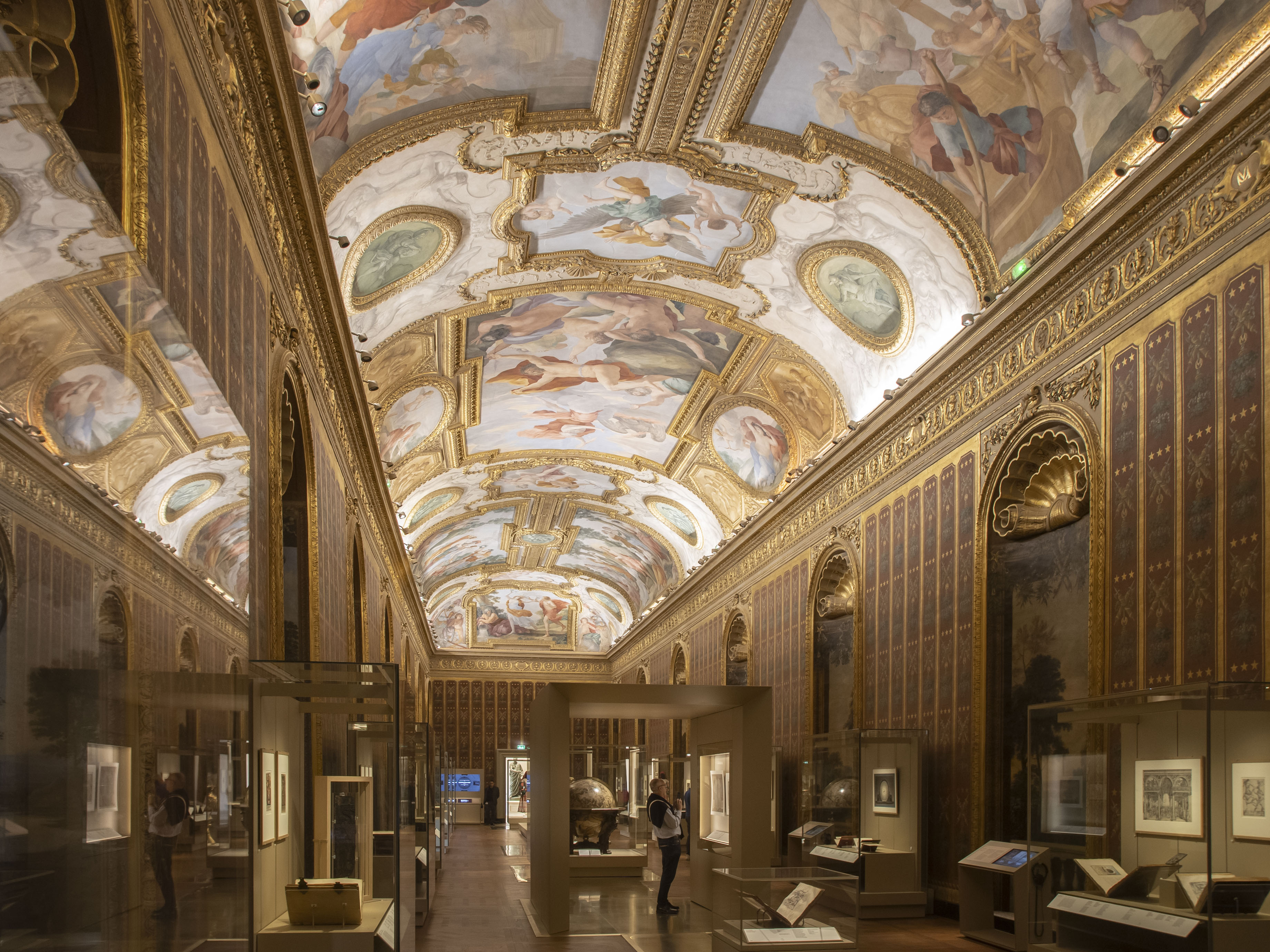
Galerie Mazarine in 2023

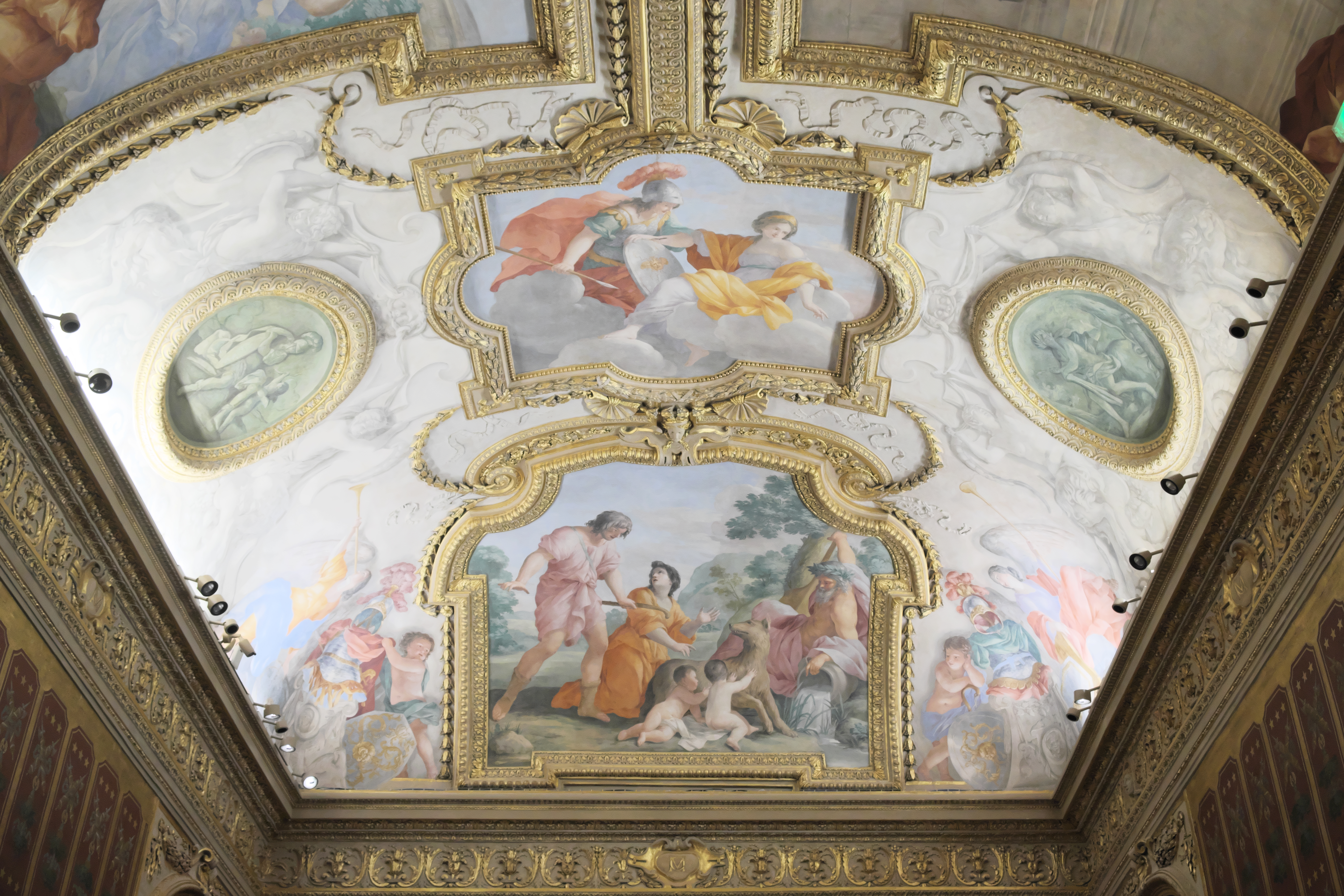
Ceiling paintings by Romanelli

In 1721, the Palais Mazarin became the site of the King's Library (Bibliothèque du Roi), now the Richelieu site of the Bibliothèque nationale de France. Mazarin spent little time in his Palace; he lived most of the time in the Palais Royal, when Louis XIV was in residence there, or in the Louvre. Near the end of his life he resided in the Château de Vincennes, where he decorated a suite of rooms. He also had the moats of the chateau turned into a kind of zoo, with lions, tigers, bears and other exotic animals, for the amusement of the young King.

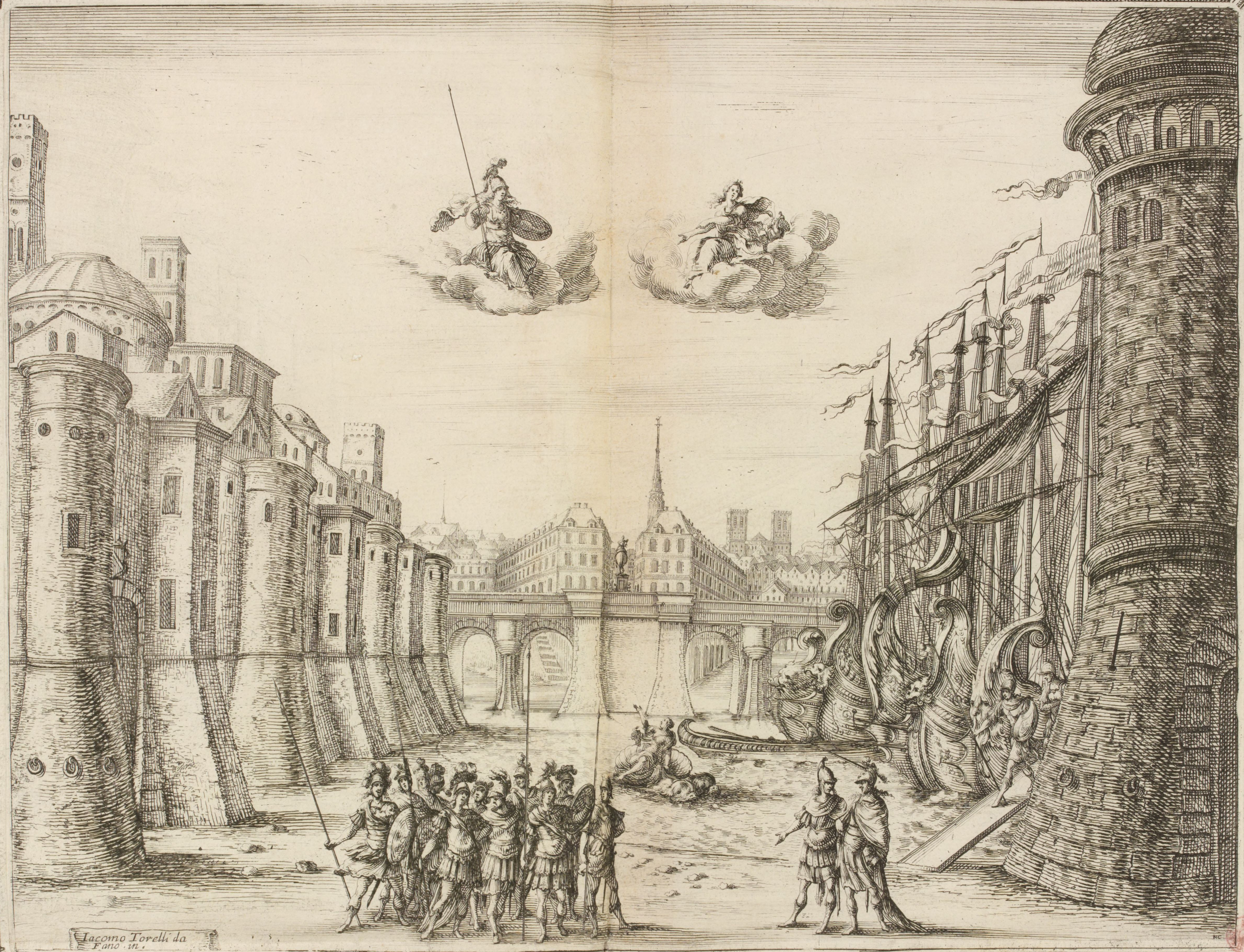
Torelli's set design for Act 1 of La finta pazza as performed at the Petit-Bourbon in 1645

Mazarin also played an important role in bringing Italian music to Paris. Before Mazarin, Italian opera was very little known or appreciated in Paris. Louis XIII, Catherine de Medici and Marie de Medici had all brought Italian musicians to Paris, but Mazarin did it more systematically and on a much larger scale. After his arrival as a minister in 1643, he invited the famous soprano Leonora Baroni and the castrato Atto Melani. Melani doubled as a diplomat; Mazarin sent him on several secret missions to other courts in Europe.

Due to Mazarin's efforts, seven Italian operas were performed in Paris between 1645 and 1662. In 1645 Mazarin brought to Paris the famous scenery designer Giacomo Torelli, who staged Sacrati's opera La finta pazza. In 1647, for Carnaval, he staged a lavish production of the premiere of Orfeo by Luigi Rossi. Later on Torelli became involved more in the ballet de cour than in opera, reflecting the passion of the king for dancing. Torelli's career in France came to a definitive end in 1661, when he worked on sets for Molière's Les fâcheux, presented by Nicholas Fouquet as part of his grand fête at Vaux-le-Vicomte in honor of the King, the overly ostentatious display which ultimately led to Fouquet's imprisonment.

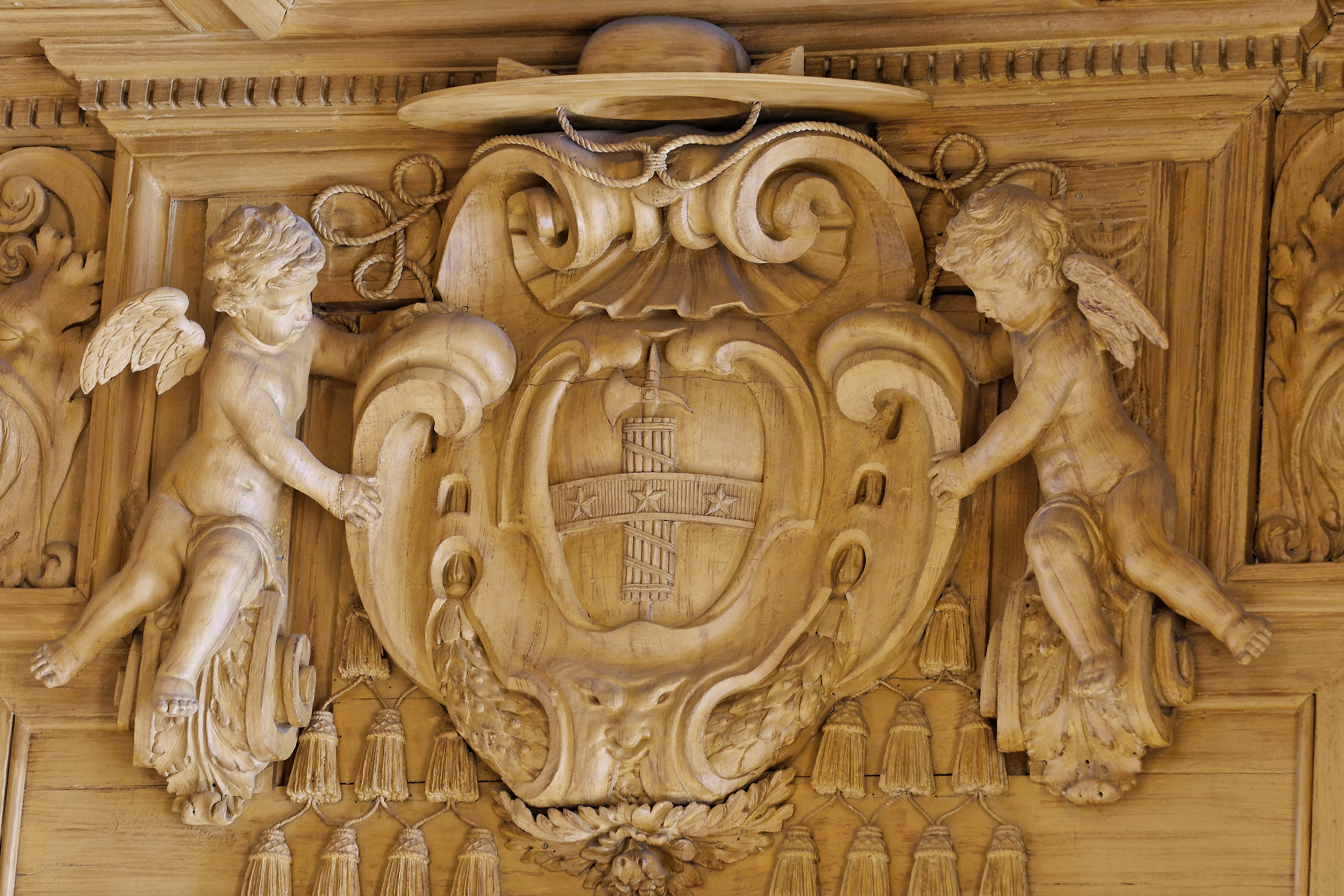
Carved coat of arms of Mazarin on a bookcase in the Bibliothèque Mazarine in Paris

Mazarin was also a famous collector of books. In 1646, he brought to Paris his collection of nine thousand volumes, which he installed in his residence. It was the second-largest library in Paris, second only to the library of the King. However, when Mazarin was forced to leave Paris during the Fronde, his library was seized by the Fronde leaders, and was dispersed. He then began a second library with what was left of the first. The library grew to over 25,000 volumes and was open to all scholars after 1643. It is recognized as the first true public library in France. In his will, he gave his library to the Collège des Quatre-Nations which he had founded in 1661. The original bookcases of his library were transferred to the reading room of the College of Quatre-Nations when it was built.

== Educator of Louis XIV ==
From the eighth birthday of the young Louis XIV, Mazarin took the title "Superintendent of the Royal Education" and managed every aspect of the young King's studies. All of the King's activities were governed and scheduled by Mazarin; his time of rising, his prayers, his physical exercise (paume fencing, and dance) followed by a morning lesson in politics with Mazarin himself. In the afternoons he was charged to write an essay each day for Mazarin on what he had learned. The education he gave Louis was purely practical, not theoretical. Among other topics, he instructed the King in the fine art of dissimulation, or lying, when needed, and always, when making an agreement, to leave a way out.

Beginning in 1659, as the King reached the age of twenty-one, and Mazarin approached the end of his life, he wrote a series of guidelines in political affairs for the King. When the King set off on his journey to Spain to be married, Mazarin wrote to him: "Remember, I ask you, what I have had the honor to tell you, when you asked me the way to take to become a great King....it is necessary to begin by making the greatest efforts to not be dominated by any passion....because, otherwise, if any misfortune arrives, regardless of what good will you have, you will not be able to do what has to be done."

Despite Mazarin's instructions, Louis XIV continued to correspond with Mazarin's niece Marie, with the tacit collusion of his mother. Mazarin immediately adopted a stricter tone: "God established Kings...for watching over the well-being, safety and peace of their subjects; and not to sacrifice this well-being and safety for their personal passions...you must remember your responsibilities to God for your actions and for your safety, and to the world for the support of your glory and your reputation." Mazarin also threatened to depart France with his family if the King did not agree to stop communicating with Marie. In response, Louis wrote a new letter to his mother, promising that henceforth he would forget Marie and concentrate exclusively on "the great occupation of King". (Grand metier du Roi)

== Final military and diplomatic accomplishments (1658–1661) ==
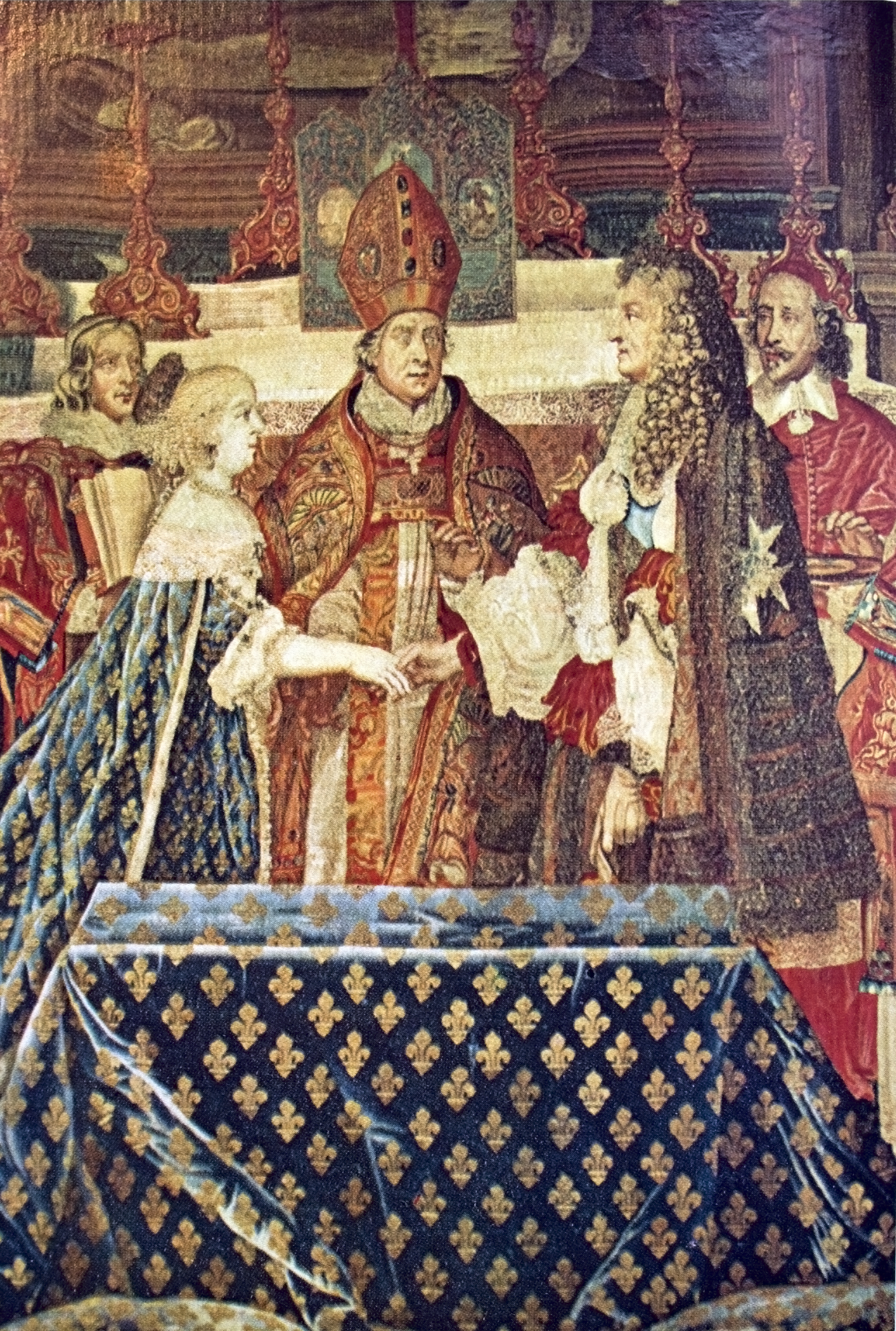
The wedding of Louis XIV and Maria Theresa. Mazarin is at their right.

The last years of Mazarin's life, between 1658 and his death in 1661, were marked by a series of major diplomatic victories, including the marriage of Louis XIV. In 1658, after long and intense preparation, Mazarin unveiled the League of the Rhine, a new group of fifty small German principalities which were now linked by a treaty with France. They promised not to allow enemy forces pass through them to invade France. This treaty weakened both the old Holy Roman Empire and the Austrian Empire of the Habsburgs, This gave a new measure of security to France's eastern border. In the same month, Marshal Turenne decisively defeated the army of Condé at the Battle of the Dunes in Flanders. This marked the end of the threats to France from the north, from the Spanish Netherlands.

Negotiation of a draft peace treaty between France and Spain took place between February and June 1659, but many critical details remained unresolved. Mazarin and Spain's Dom Luis de Haro personally took charge of the negotiations on 13 August. Their conferences, which continued for three months, were held on the French-Spanish border on the island of Faisans, midway between French Hendaye and Spanish Fuenterrabía, in the river Bidassoa. The resulting Treaty of the Pyrenees was signed on 7 November 1659 and added Artois, Cerdanya, and Roussillon as new provinces of France. It also provided for an even more important diplomatic event carefully arranged by Mazarin, the marriage of Louis XIV with Maria Theresa of Spain, the French celebration of which followed in June 1660 in nearby Saint-Jean-de-Luz. The couple made a triumphant entry into Paris on 26 August 1660. This marriage and accompanying agreements ended, at least for a time, the long and costly wars between the Austrians and France.

Mazarin, as the de facto ruler of France, played a crucial role in establishing the Westphalian principles that would guide European states' foreign policy and the prevailing world order. Some of these principles, such as the nation state's sovereignty over its territory and domestic affairs and the legal equality among states, remain the basis of international law to this day.

== Death and legacy ==
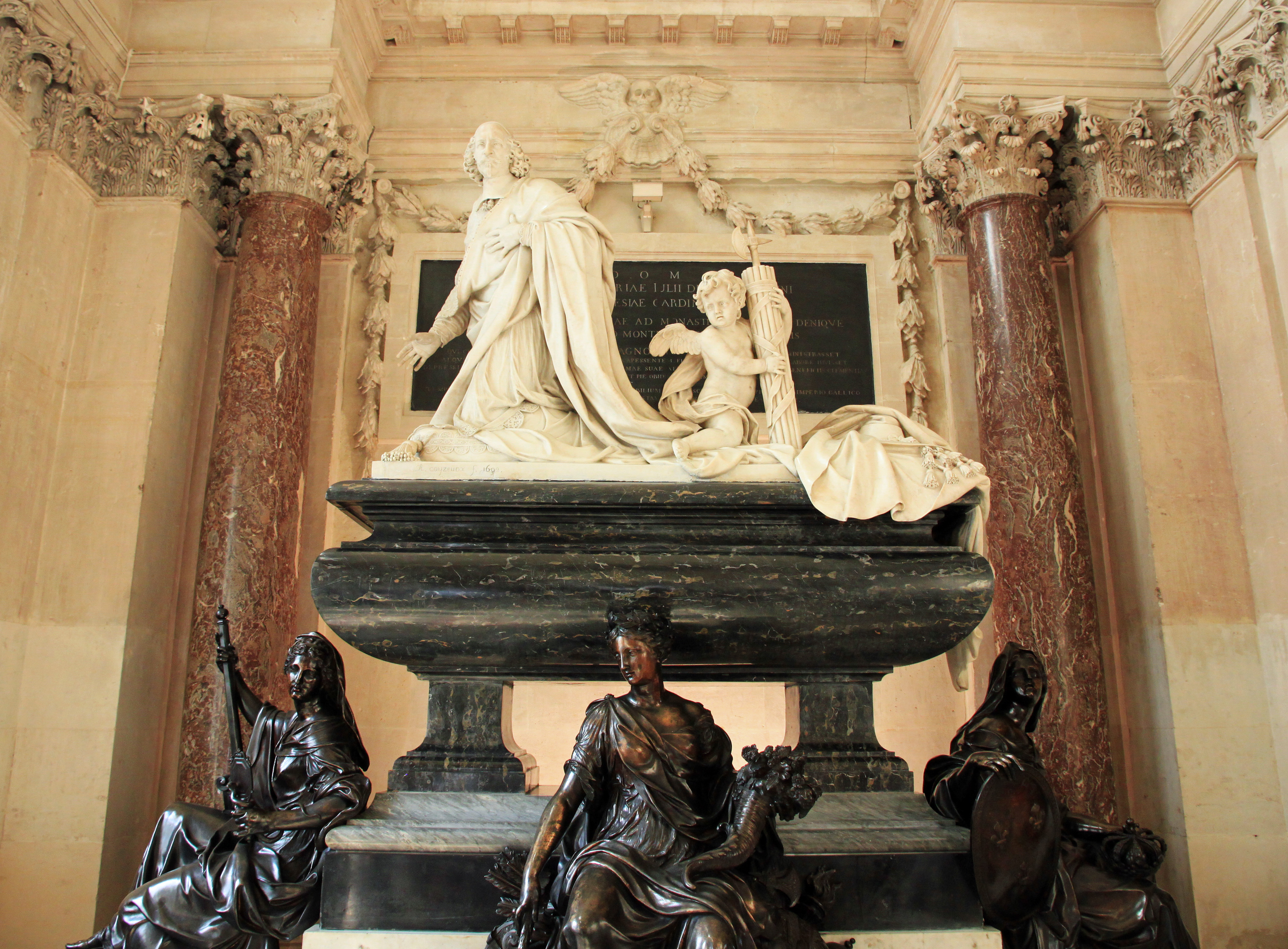
Tomb of Mazarin in the Institut de France

In his last months, Mazarin resided mainly in the Louvre Palace. A large fire broke out in the Galerie des Rois, the main picture gallery of the Petite Galerie of the Louvre, and destroyed many pictures, greatly upsetting Mazarin. It was the beginning of his decline. When his doctor informed him that his end was near, Mazarin asked, "How long?" The Doctor replied "two months." Mazarin responded, "That's enough." Mazarin had already been ill and weak before the fire at the Louvre. After the fire, he returned to Palais Mazarin, where he spent his last month, with frequent visits from Louis XIV and Queen Anne of Austria. Mazarin died of an unknown illness on 9 March 1661.

At Mazarin's death, he was second in France only to Louis XIV in wealth. Nearing death in March 1661, he offered a large gift of his estate to Louis XIV, which the king refused. Mazarin prepared a will to the King instead. In addition to works of art and fine furnishings, he issued a bequest of his jewels, including the dix-huits mazarins, the large eighteen diamonds in the collection, which were valued at two million livres. Mazarin had also prepared a different will, which left a large sum for the establishment of the Collège des Quatre-Nations, which he had founded for students from the four new provinces added to the territory of France by the Treaty of Westphalia. The college, now the Institut de France, was eventually built directly across the Seine from the Louvre, where it is visible from the Palace.

Mazarin had already prepared several wills. Knowing that his enemies at court were telling Louis XIV that he was taking money that belonged rightfully to the King, his first will, which he made public, cleverly left all of his fortune to Louis XIV. Mazarin probably calculated that the King would be too embarrassed to take all of his mentor's and chief Minister's wealth. The King waited for three days, then refused to accept it. Mazarin asked that his remains be interred there, where they rest today in a marble monument beneath the dome. The college is home to the five French academies, including the Academie Française.

== Mazarine blue colour ==
Since the eighteenth century, a deep blue-purple colour commonly used in porcelain has been called "mazarine blue" in commemoration of Cardinal Mazarin, and the colour was used to name the Mazarine Blue butterfly, Cyaniris semiargus.

== In fiction ==
- Mazarin is a major character in Alexandre Dumas' novels Twenty Years After and Le Vicomte de Bragelonne. In them, Mazarin is portrayed as greedy and devious, as well as the Queen's lover.
- Mazarin plays a significant part in Letitia Elizabeth Landon's historical novel, Francesca Carrara. He acts as uncle to his niece, Marie Mancini and her fictional sister, Henriette, both of whom have important roles.
- Cardinal Mazarin is an important supporting character in Rafael Sabatini's novel The Suitors of Yvonne. His plans set the main plot of the book in progress. He is portrayed fairly accurately as being ambitious and ruthless, but very protective of his family.
- Mazarin is a character of some importance in 1634: The Galileo Affair by Eric Flint and Andrew Dennis, and also in 1636: The Cardinal Virtues by Eric Flint and Walter H. Hunt.
- A diamond called the "Mazarin stone" is searched for in a 1921 Sherlock Holmes short story by Arthur Conan Doyle, "The Adventure of the Mazarin Stone".
- Mazarin is a major character in the 2005 series Young Blades, portrayed by Michael Ironside.
- Mazarin (played by Gérard Depardieu) serves as the mastermind antagonist in the Hallmark movie La Femme Musketeer. Personality- and ambition-wise, he is nearly identical to Cardinal Richelieu.
- Umberto Eco's novel The Island of the Day Before takes place just after the transition from Richelieu's rule to Mazarin's. Its protagonist witnesses the death watch for Richelieu and is subsequently forced by Mazarin to undertake a bizarre mission to the other side of the world.
- Mazarin plays a central role in the play "Vincent in Heaven", which tells the story of St. Vincent DePaul.
- Mazarin is a character in the French TV series of the 1960s, Le Chevalier Tempête, shown in the UK as The Flashing Blade. He was played by the Belgian actor Giani Esposito.
- Mazarin is claimed to be the actual biological father of Louis XIV in Edward Rutherfurd's novel, Paris (2013).
- Mazarin is the antagonist of the novel Enchantress of Paris (2015) by Marci Jefferson. Mazarin uses the wiles of his niece, Marie Mancini, in an attempt to secure his power over the king.

== Notes and citations ==
Notes

Citations

== Sources ==
- Ballon, Hilary (1999). Louis Le Vau: Mazarin's Collège, Colbert's Revenge. Princeton NJ: Princeton University Press. ISBN 9780691048956.
- Bluche, François (1990). Louis XIV. New York: Franklin Watts. ISBN 978-0531151129.
- Buelow, George J. (2004). A history of baroque music. Bloomington: Indiana University Press. ISBN 978-0-253-34365-9.
- Bourbon-Busset, Jacques de (1959). "Chapitre II: Le vaincu de la Fronde devient monarque absolu". In Mongrédien, Georges (ed.). Mazarin (in French). Paris: Hachette. pp. 53–81. OCLC 742625187.
- Colombier, Pierre du (1959). "Chapitre IV: Le Premier ministre se fait l'ambassadeur de l'art italien". In Mongrédien, Georges (ed.). Mazarin (in French). Paris: Hachette. pp. 113–151. OCLC 742625187.
- Dethan, Georges (1959). "Chapitre I: Le jeune Monsignore à la conquête de Richelieu". In Mongrédien, Georges (ed.). Mazarin (in French). Paris: Hachette. pp. 7–51. OCLC 742625187.
- Dethan, Georges (1977). The Young Mazarin. Translated by Baron, Stanley. London: Thames and Hudson. ISBN 978-0500870044.
- Dethan, Georges (1991). "Mazarin, Jules, Cardinal". The New Encyclopædia Britannica. Vol. 7 (15th ed.). Chicago: Encyclopædia Britannica, Inc. pp. 979–980. ISBN 0-85229-529-4.
- Dulong, Claude (1990). La fortune de Mazarin (in French). Paris: Perrin. ISBN 2-262-00849-3. ISBN 9782262056742 (ePub edition, 2015).
- Goubert, Pierre (1990). Mazarin (in French). Paris: Fayard. ISBN 2-213-01650-X.
- Jurewitz-Freischmidt, Sylvia (2002). Galantes Versailles. Die Mätressen am Hofe der Bourbonen (in German). Munich: Piper. ISBN 978-3-492-24494-7.
- Mongrédien, Georges (1959). "Chapitre VIII: Le rideau s'est levé sur le Grand Siècle". In Mongrédien, Georges (ed.). Mazarin (in French). Paris: Hachette. pp. 255–292. OCLC 742625187.
- O'Connor, John T. (1978). Negotiator Out of Season: Career of Wilhelm Egon Von Furstenberg, 1629–1704. Athens: U of Georgia Press. ISBN 978-0-8203-0436-6.
- Ormesson, Jean d' (1959). "Chapitre VI: Le vieil homme et le jeune Roi". In Mongrédien, Georges (ed.). Mazarin (in French). Paris: Hachette. pp. 201–225. OCLC 742625187.
- Parlett, David (1991). A History of Card Games. Oxford: Oxford University Press. ISBN 0-19-282905-X.
- Poncet, Olivier (2018). Mazarin l'Italien (in French). Paris: Tallandier. ISBN 979-10-210-3105-0.
- Treasure, Geoffrey (1995). Mazarin: The Crisis of Absolutism in France. London: Routledge. ISBN 0-415-014573.

Catholic Church titles
Preceded by Armand de Bourbon, Prince of Conti	Abbot of Cluny; 1654–1661	Succeeded by Rinaldo d'Este
Political offices
Preceded by Cardinal Richelieu	Chief Minister to the French Monarch; 1643–1661	Succeeded by Jean-Baptiste Colbert
French royalty
Preceded by Charles III Gonzaga	Duke of Nevers; 1659–1661	Succeeded by Philippe Jules Mancini
