= Russka =

1991 historical novel by Edward Rutherfurd

- First edition (UK)
- Author: Edward Rutherfurd
- Language: English
- Genre: Historical novel
- Publisher: Century Hutchinson (UK); Crown Publishers (US)
- Publication date: July 1991
- Publication place: United Kingdom
- Media type: Print (hardback & paperback)
- Pages: 704 pp (first edition, hardback)
- ISBN: 978-0-7126-2466-4 (first edition, hardback)
- OCLC: 21293710

Russka is a historical novel by Edward Rutherfurd, published in 1991 by Crown Publishers. It quickly became a New York Times bestseller.

== Plot summary ==
The narrative spans 1,800 years of Russian history. The families that provide the focus for the story are the Bobrovs, Romanovs, Karpenkos, Suvorins and Popovs. The five families span the main ethnic groups and social levels of the society in this northern empire.

Historical characters encountered through the narrative include Genghis Khan, Ivan the Terrible and his secret police, the westernizing Peter the Great, Catherine the Great, and the Bolsheviks of the twentieth century.

The stories of different characters in those families use actual stories of different Russian families. The peasant family that joins the nobility, because of its business, is based on the Stroganovs. The nobleman who is a friend of Ivan IV of Russia and asks his territory to be part of the Oprichnina is also based on a member of the Stroganovs but at a different period.

== Publication details ==
- 1991, UK, Century (ISBN 978-0-7126-2466-4), July 1991, hardback (first edition)
- 1991, USA, Crown Pub (ISBN 978-0517580486), ? September 1991, hardback
- 1992, UK, Arrow Books (ISBN 978-0099635208), June 1992, paperback
- 2005, USA, Ballantine Books (ISBN 978-0345479358), March 2005, paperback
- 2021, Russian Federation, Азбука-Аттикус (ISBN 978-5389197060), May 2021, hardback
