= Dublin: Foundation =

2004 book by Edward Rutherfurd

Dublin: Foundation (US title The Princes of Ireland: The Dublin Saga)
- First edition cover
- Author: Edward Rutherfurd
- Language: English
- Series: The Dublin Saga
- Genre: Historical novel
- Publisher: Century Hutchinson
- Publication date: 4 March 2004
- Publication place: United Kingdom
- Media type: Print (hardback & paperback)
- Pages: 804 pp (first edition, hardback)
- ISBN: 0-7126-8000-4 (first edition, hardback)
- OCLC: 54507587
- Followed by: Ireland: Awakening

Dublin: Foundation (2004) (also known in North America as The Princes of Ireland: The Dublin Saga or sometimes simply Dublin) is a novel by Edward Rutherfurd first published in 2004 by Century Hutchinson and then by Seal Books and Doubleday Canada.

It is a work of historical fiction and centers on a number of families and their descendants in and around the area of Ireland that is now Dublin. It begins in AD 430 with the love affair of a prince (Conall) and the daughter of an Irish chief (Deirdre) from the area of Dubh Linn. It concludes in AD 1533, with the disappearance of the Staff of Saint Patrick. Historical characters include Saint Patrick, Brian Boru, Strongbow, and King John of England, among others.

== Chapters ==
- Prologue - Emerald Sun
- Dubh Linn (AD 430)
- Tara (AD 430)
- Patrick (AD 450)
- Vikings (AD 981)
- Brian Boru (AD 999)
- Strongbow (AD 1167)
- Dalkey (AD 1370)
- The Pale (AD 1487)
- Silken Thomas (AD 1533)

== Publishing history ==
- 2004, UK, century Hutchinson (ISBN 978-0-7126-8000-4) 4 March 2004, hardback, (First edition)
- 2004, USA, Doubleday (ISBN 978-0-385-50286-3), pub date ? March 2004, hardback (as The Princes of Ireland: The Dublin Saga)
- 2004, Canada, Doubleday Canada (ISBN 978-0385659062), pub date ? March 2004, hardback (as The Princes of Ireland: The Dublin Saga)
- 2004, Canada, Random House Large Print Publishing (ISBN 978-0375433016), pub date ? March 2004, large print hardback (as The Princes of Ireland: The Dublin Saga)
- 2005, UK, Arrow Books (ISBN 978-0099279082), Pub date 5 May 2005, paperback (as Dublin)
- 2005, USA, Ballantine Books (ISBN 978-0-345-47235-9), Pub date ? March 2005, paperback (as The Princes of Ireland: The Dublin Saga)
- 2006, USA, Seal Books (ISBN 978-0-7704-2907-2), Pub date ? ? 2006, paperback (as The Princes of Ireland: The Dublin Saga)
