= London (novel) =

1997 novel by Edward Rutherfurd

- First edition cover
- Author: Edward Rutherfurd
- Language: English
- Genre: Historical novel
- Publisher: Century Hutchinson
- Publication date: May 1997
- Publication place: United Kingdom
- Media type: Print (hardback & paperback)
- Pages: 829 pp (first edition, hardback)
- ISBN: 978-0-7126-5419-7 (first edition, hardback)
- OCLC: 36915944

London is a historical novel by Edward Rutherfurd published in 1997, which charts the history of London from 54 B.C. to 1997. The novel begins with the birth of the River Thames and moves to 54 B.C., detailing the life of Segovax, a curious character with slightly webbed hands and a flash of white hair. Segovax becomes the ancestor of the Ducket and Dogget families, prominent fictional families woven into the novel.

Historical figures, such as Julius Caesar, Geoffrey Chaucer, Henry VIII, William Shakespeare, and Pocahontas, make appearances alongside fictional characters and historical kings and queens of England.

== Reception ==
"[W]ide range of characters that the readers will either love or hate... all manner of people with all kinds of backgrounds... Rutherfurd is adept at showing how all classes throughout history, from slaves to kings, have contributed to London's development".

The Virginia Pilot said of the novel:

"With confidence and skill, Rutherfurd has separated those layers and produced a remarkable story of a great city. Once or twice the social, political and economic factors overshadow the fictional families, but that is almost inevitable when even the best fiction comes up against such an impressive spectrum of historical fact."

== Publication details ==
- 1997, UK, Century (ISBN 978-0-7126-5419-7), May 1997, hardback (first edition)
- 1997, USA, Crown Pub (ISBN 978-0517591819), June 1997, hardback
- 1997, UK, Century (ISBN 978-0712678384), 1997, paperback
- 1998, USA, Fawcett Books (ISBN 978-0449002636), 30 April 1998, paperback
- 1998, UK, Arrow Books (ISBN 978-0099201915), 7 May 1998, paperback
- 2002, USA, Ballantine Books (ISBN 978-0345455680), 1 November 2002, paperback
