= Sarum (novel) =

1987 novel by Edward Rutherfurd

- Sarum first edition cover.
- Author: Edward Rutherfurd
- Language: English
- Genre: Historical novel
- Publisher: Century Hutchinson
- Publication date: 7 May 1987
- Publication place: United Kingdom
- Media type: Print (hardback & paperback)
- Pages: 1145 pp (first edition)
- ISBN: 0-7126-1447-8
- OCLC: 15591802

Sarum (also titled Sarum: The Novel of England) is a work of historical fiction by Edward Rutherfurd, first published in 1987. It was Rutherfurd's literary debut. It tells the story of England through the tales of several families in and around the English city of Salisbury, the writer's hometown, from prehistoric times to 1985.

== Characters ==
The main families of Sarum include:

- Forest
- Wilson
- Porters
- Mason
- Shockley
- Godfrey

== Synopsis ==
The story covers major points of British history. The following chapter listing parallels major periods and events :

=== Old Sarum ===
- Journey to Sarum (prehistoric Britain, 7500 BC)
- The Barrow (the arrival of agriculture in Britain, 4000 BC)
- The Henge (the building of Stonehenge, 2000 BC)
- Sorviodunum (the arrival of the Romans, 42 AD)
- Twilight (the fall of the Roman Empire/arrival of the Saxons, 427 AD)
- The Two Rivers (arrival of the Vikings/uniting of England, 877 AD)
- The Castle (Norman England, 1139 AD)

=== New Sarum ===
- The Founding (the founding of New Sarum/building of Salisbury Cathedral, 1244–1310)
- The Death (the Black Death, 1348–1382)
- The Rose (the Rule of Lancaster, 1456)
- A Journey From Sarum (1480)
- New World (The Reformation, 1553–1580)
- The Unrest (The English Civil War/ the Exclusion Crisis, 1642–1688)
- The Calm (the eighteenth century, 1720–1779)
- Boney (the Battle of Trafalgar, 1803–1830)
- Empire (the British Empire, 1854–1889)
- The Henge II (World War I/the selling of Stonehenge, 1915)
- The Encampment (World War II, 1944)
- The Spire (Salisbury in 1985)
