= New York (novel) =

2009 novel by Edward Rutherfurd

New York: a Novel
- New York first (UK) edition cover
- Author: Edward Rutherfurd
- Illustrator: Mike Morganfeld (maps)
- Language: English
- Genre: Historical novel
- Publisher: Century Hutchinson, Doubleday (US)
- Publication date: 3 September 2009
- Publication place: United Kingdom
- Media type: Print (hardback & paperback)
- Pages: 1040 pp (first edition) (862 pp US first ed.)
- ISBN: 978-1-84605-195-1
- OCLC: 613432261

Edward Rutherfurd talking on Bookbits radio about New York

New York: a Novel (2009) is an historical novel by British novelist Edward Rutherfurd. The United States edition is published by Doubleday under the title New York: The Novel.

== Synopsis ==
The novel chronicles the birth and growth of New York City, from the arrival of the first Dutch and other European colonists in the 17th century to the summer of 2009. Rutherford builds his novel on the histories of fictional families who live there. In New York, these families represent the successive waves of immigrants who have made the city multicultural.

The early Dutch founders of New Amsterdam are typified by the Van Dyck family, who prosper in trade with the Native Americans; both the local Algonquian tribes, especially the Lenape, and the Iroquoian Mohawk who lived farther up the Hudson Valley and primarily along the Mohawk Valley. The Van Dycks soon unite with the English Thomas Master family (he also has a natural Native American daughter, whom he brings with him from Puritan New England). Van Dyck-Master descendants continue to live in New York through the entire saga, providing one of the unifying narrative strands. The character Quash is an enslaved African, who was brought forcibly to New Amsterdam and is held by Thomas Master; his descendants become part of the New York cultural mix.

As the novel progresses, more families are introduced: the Irish O'Donnels, German Kellers, Italian Carusos, German-Jewish Adlers, and Puerto Rican Campos. Through their intertwining stories, Rutherfurd explores the various cultural traditions of the national groups and intercultural relations, which play out against the development of the city.

Rutherfurd breaks the narrative into sections by date, twenty-seven in all. Most dates comprise one chapter; a few dates continue through two or three chapters. A set of three well-drawn maps of Manhattan Island helps the reader follow the action as the city develops. A fourth map of the New York City region provides a larger geographical context.

== Critical reception ==
Brigitte Weeks of The Washington Post praised the novel and advised readers against trying to determine the accuracy of every name or event:

But analyzing the veracity of every incident will spoil the fun, and what makes this novel so entertaining is the riotous, multilayered portrait of a whole metropolis. Rutherfurd offers the reader a chance to watch a rural outcrop grow into one of the world's greatest cities in a mere 350 years. He delivers magnificently on the challenge; it is hard to imagine any other writer combining such astonishing depth of research with the imagination and ingenuity to hold it all together.

New York won the Langum Prize for American Historical Fiction in 2010.

== See also ==
- History of New York City
