= Ireland: Awakening =

2006 book by Edward Rutherfurd

Ireland: Awakening (US title: The Rebels of Ireland: The Dublin Saga)
- First edition cover
- Author: Edward Rutherfurd
- Language: English
- Series: The Dublin Saga
- Genre: Historical novel
- Publisher: Century Hutchinson
- Publication date: 2 March 2006
- Publication place: England
- Media type: Print (hardback & paperback)
- Pages: 896 pp (first edition, hardback)
- ISBN: 978-1-84413-794-7 (first edition, hardback)
- OCLC: 62479060
- Preceded by: Dublin: Foundation

Ireland: Awakening (2006) (also known in North America as The Rebels of Ireland: The Dublin Saga) is a novel by Edward Rutherfurd first published in 2006 by Century Hutchinson. It concludes the two-part series known as The Dublin Saga.

== Plot summary ==
This sequel to Dublin: Foundation, also set in Ireland, follows the clans or families of the O'Byrnes, Walshes, and MacGowans. Other families appear on the scene and together they live through the Cromwellian period, the Protestant Ascendancy and the Famine.

== Publishing history ==
- 2006, UK, Century (ISBN 978-1-84413-794-7), pub date 2 March 2006, hardback (first edition)
- 2006, Canada, Doubleday Canada (ISBN 978-0385659062), pub date 2 March 2006, hardback (as The Rebels of Ireland: The Dublin Saga)
- 2007, USA, Ballantine Books (ISBN 978-0345472366), pub date 27 February 2007, paperback (as The Rebels of Ireland: The Dublin Saga)
- 2007, UK, Arrow Books (ISBN 978-0099476559), pub date 1 March 2007, paperback

== Bibliography ==
- Rutherfurd, Edward (2 March 2006). Ireland: Awakening (1st ed.). London: Century Hutchinson. ISBN 978-1-84413-794-7.
- "Ireland: Awakening". FantasticFiction. Archived from the original on 26 September 2008.
