= Paris (Rutherfurd novel) =

2013 novel by Edward Rutherfurd

- First edition (US)
- Author: Edward Rutherfurd
- Language: English
- Genre: Historical novel
- Publisher: Hodder & Stoughton (UK); Doubleday (US)
- Publication date: 23 April 2013
- Publication place: USA
- Media type: Print (hardback & paperback)
- Pages: 832 pp (first edition, hardback)
- ISBN: 978-0-7126-5419-7 (first edition, hardcover)

Paris is a historical novel by Edward Rutherfurd published in 2013, which charts the history of Paris from 1261 to 1968.

The novel follows six core families set in locales such as Montmartre, Notre Dame and Boulevard Saint-Germain. It includes a map of old Paris. It was later titled Paris: A Novel.

== Plot ==
The novel follows six families: the Le Sourds (a revolutionary family), the de Cygnes (a noble family), the Renards (a bourgeois family of merchants), the Blanchards (a family of Napoleon supporters), the Gascons (a family from the slums) and the Jacobs (an art dealing Jewish family). The book follows two timelines throughout, containing a large number of characters and is based on real events.

== Reception ==
"This saga is filled with historical detail and a huge cast of characters, fictional and real, spanning generations and centuries. But Paris, with its art, architecture, culture and couture, is the undisputed main character." — Fort Worth Star-Telegram

"Both Paris, the venerable City of Light, and Rutherfurd, the undisputed master of the multigenerational historical saga, shine in this sumptuous urban epic." — Booklist

A columnist for The Telegraph, however, gave it a rather scathing review, calling the novel "swollen", "encyclopedic", and saying that "character and plot are blithely sacrificed on the altar of trivia with every turn of the page."

== Publication details ==
- 2013, UK, Hodder, 752 pages
- 2013, USA, Doubleday (ISBN 978-0385535304), hard cover, 832 pages, first edition
- 2014, USA, Ballantine Books (ISBN 978-0345530769), paperback, 832 pages
