= The Forest (novel) =

2000 historical novel by Edward Rutherfurd

- First edition cover
- Author: Edward Rutherfurd
- Language: English
- Genre: Historical novel
- Publisher: Century Hutchinson
- Publication date: 6 April 2000
- Publication place: United Kingdom
- Media type: Print (hardback & paperback)
- Pages: 624 pp (first edition, hardback)
- ISBN: 978-0-7126-7999-2 (first edition, hardback)
- OCLC: 59431431

The Forest is a historical novel by Edward Rutherfurd, published in 2000. Drawing on the success of Rutherfurd's other epic novels, this went on to sell well and appeared on numerous bestseller lists.

== Plot summary ==
Set in the New Forest of southern England, this novel covers the lives of a number of families tracing their history from the Saxons and Normans in 1099 through a "Jane Austen" style world of the early 19th century to present. Story and characters combine to reveal and decorate the narrative in an important region in England not often used by writers.

== Reception ==
"As entertaining as Sarum and Rutherfurd's other sweeping novel of British history, London." — Boston Globe

"The Forest is Michener told with an English accent." — St. Louis Post-Dispatch

"As literature, Edward Rutherfurd's historical novels are not successful. They judder slowly along ill-made roads, like carts with square wheels, and the beauty of the scenery through which they pass does not entirely distract the passenger's mind from his aching bottom and tired eyes. As vehicles for delivering the fruits of research, however, they are not only efficient, but might truly be called works of art." — The Independent

== Publication details ==
- 2000, UK, Century (ISBN 978-0-7126-7999-2), pub date 6 April 2000, hardback (first edition)
- 2000, USA, Crown Pub (ISBN 978-0609603826), pub date ? April 2000, hardback
- 2001, UK, Arrow Books (ISBN 978-0099279075), pub date 5 April 2001, paperback
- 2001, USA, Ballantine Books (ISBN 978-0345441782), pub date ? July 2001, paperback
