= Edward Rutherfurd =

English writer (born 1948)

Francis Edward Wintle
- Born: 1948 (age 77–78); Salisbury, England
- Occupation: Writer
- Writing career
- Pen name: Edward Rutherfurd
- Genre: Historical Fiction
- Notable work: Sarum
- Notable awards: Langum Prize for American Historical Fiction; City of Zaragoza's International Historical Novel Honor Award
- Website: edwardrutherfurd.com

Francis Edward Wintle (born 1948), known by his pen name Edward Rutherfurd, is an English novelist. He is best known as a writer of epic historical novels that span long periods of history but are set in particular places. His debut novel, Sarum, set the pattern for his work with a 10,000-year storyline.

== Biography ==
Rutherfurd attended the University of Cambridge and Stanford Business School, where he earned a Sloan fellowship. After graduating he worked in political research, bookselling and publishing. He abandoned his career in the book trade in 1983 and returned to his childhood home to write Sarum, a historical novel with a 10,000-year story, set in the area around the ancient monument of Stonehenge and Salisbury.

His books have sold more than 15 million copies and have been translated into 20 languages. Rutherfurd settled near Dublin, Ireland, in the early 1990s, but currently divides his time between Europe and North America.

In 2015 he received the City of Zaragoza's International Historical Novel Honor Award "for his body of work in the field of the historical novel."

== Style ==
Rutherfurd invents four to six fictional families and tells the stories of their descendants. Using this framework, he chronicles the history of a place, often from the beginning of civilisation to modern times – a kind of historical fiction inspired by the work of James Michener.

Rutherfurd's novels are generally at least 500 pages in length and sometimes more than 1,000. Divided into a number of parts, each chapter represents a different era in the place where the novel is set. There is usually an extensive family tree in the introduction, with each generational line matching the corresponding chapters.

== Works ==
- Sarum (1987): the story of England from prehistoric to modern times, centered on a number of families around Salisbury.
- Russka (1991): chronicles 1,800 years of Russian history.
- London (1997): presents the history of London from 54 B.C. to 1997.
- The Forest (2000): set in the New Forest, it centers on a number of families from the Saxons to the present.
- Dublin: Foundation (2004): centers on a number of families around what is now Dublin, Ireland, in the years 430-1533.
- Ireland: Awakening (2006) concludes Dublin: Foundation.
- New York (2009): a history of New York City from the 1600s to the summer of 2009.
- Paris (2013): follows six core families, set in locales such as Montmartre, Notre Dame and Boulevard Saint-Germain.
- China (2021)
