= Mari Yoriko Sabusawa =

American translator

Mari Yoriko Sabusawa (July 10, 1920 – September 25, 1994) was a translator, activist, and philanthropist. She was the third wife of novelist James A. Michener, whom she married on October 23, 1955, in Chicago, Illinois.

== Early life ==
A second-generation Japanese American, Sabusawa was born to Harry and Riki Sabusawa and raised in Las Animas, Colorado. Her family moved to Long Beach, California in 1936. Sabusawa graduated from Long Beach Polytechnic High School in 1938, and then began studying at Long Beach Junior College.

Following the attack on Pearl Harbor and enactment of Executive Order 9066, Subasawa and her family were sent to California's Santa Anita Assembly Center and then interned at the Granada War Relocation Center (Camp Amache) in Colorado. Shortly thereafter, she was allowed to leave for Antioch College in Ohio where she received a degree in political science and international relations. Through Antioch's cooperative job program, she translated Japanese propaganda for the US intelligence service in Washington DC before attending graduate school at the University of Chicago.

In 1948, Sabusawa became the first female president of the Chicago chapter of the Japanese American Citizens League (JACL). During the early 1950s, she was engaged in community work, especially around questions of civil rights Sabusawa was editor of the American Library Association's Bulletin in Chicago in 1954 when she met her husband.

== Activism ==
Both Sabusawa and Michener were supporters of the 1956 Hungarian Revolution against the USSR. They made their home in Vienna a safe haven for refugees created by the conflict. This experience would influence Michener's novel, The Bridge at Andau, 1957.

Sabusawa spoke out in support of American-Japanese marriages in the 1950s. She urged her husband not to run for Congress as a Democrat in 1962, but nevertheless supported him when he did. Sabusawa was encouraged and helped in the research of some of Michener's novels, such as, The Bridge at Andau, Hawaii, and The Source. Michener also wrote Centennial, written in 1974, which was later produced into a miniseries by the same name. It was filmed in part at Bent's Fort, close to Sabusawa's hometown of Las Animas, Colorado.

Together with her husband, Sabusawa was involved with charitable donations, with main fields of their philanthropy being art and higher education. Notably, she established the Mari Sabusawa Michener Endowment, which funded all the educational programs at the James A. Michener Art Museum in Doylestown, Pennsylvania.

== Death ==
Sabusawa died in Austin, Texas, on September 25, 1994. She left a bequest of $5 million to the University of Texas at Austin for the construction of what would become the Blanton Museum of Art in addition to the hundreds of paintings the couple gave the university during their lifetimes.
