= The Fires of Spring =

Novel by James A. Michener

- First edition cover
- Author: James A. Michener
- Language: English
- Publisher: Random House
- Publication date: 1949
- Publication place: United States
- Media type: print
- Pages: 495pp.
- ISBN: 1-4990-7709-2

The Fires of Spring (1949) is the second book and first novel published by American author James A. Michener. Usually known for his multi-generational epics of historical fiction, The Fires of Spring was written as a partially autobiographical bildungsroman in which Michener's proxy, young orphan David Harper, searches for meaning and romance in pre-World War II Pennsylvania.

Published in the wake of the critical acclaim Michener received for Tales of the South Pacific, The Fires of Spring was received poorly by critics and viewed as far more amateurish than his previous book. In reflecting on The Fires of Spring in his memoir The World Is My Home, Michener wrote of its importance:

I was willing to write The Fires of Spring out of order because I felt that it was a book that had to be written even though I was in my forties and it was the kind of book normally written when one is in one’s twenties or thirties. I have never regretted that decision, because through the years it has probably brought me more mail from readers than any other book I’ve written, having caught the imagination of young people who were pondering the direction their lives should take. I doubt that I have ever had a letter about it from a reader past the age of thirty-five, except to recall that it had a life-changing effect when he or she read the book as a teenager.

== Background ==
Michener's first manuscript of The Fires of Spring resulted in his newly-acquired agent (Note: Michener described him as "the dean of America's literary agents".) informing him that he "had no future as a writer". Macmillan Publishers declined to publish it, but it was accepted by Random House. Despite its generally negative reception, The Fires of Spring was still in print in hardcover in 1982. Michener said he received more letters from fans about The Fires of Spring than any of his other books.

== Reception ==
John Horne Burns, whose novel The Gallery was a contender for the Pulitzer Prize that Michener received, wrote a scathing negative review of The Fires of Spring for Saturday Review.

In the New York Times, William DuBois compared The Fires of Spring unfavorably to Tales of the South Pacific, and notes that the story begins well but is overtaken by heavy-handed melodrama. Orville Prescott, also in the New York Times, takes a more generous view of the semi-autobiographical novel, finding it "immensely readable", but judges the book to be uneven and the main character "less interesting and less clearly defined than Mr. Michener's host of wonderfully well-portrayed minor characters".

Over a decade later, Robert Payne described The Fires of Spring as "probably the best" of Michener's novels. In the 1990s, when Michener published his memoir, The World Is My Home, his literary agent said that readers interested in Michener's personal life "might better turn to The Fires of Spring".
