= Brücke von Andau =

Bridge between Austria and Hungary

Coordinates: 47°42′24″N 17°04′37″E

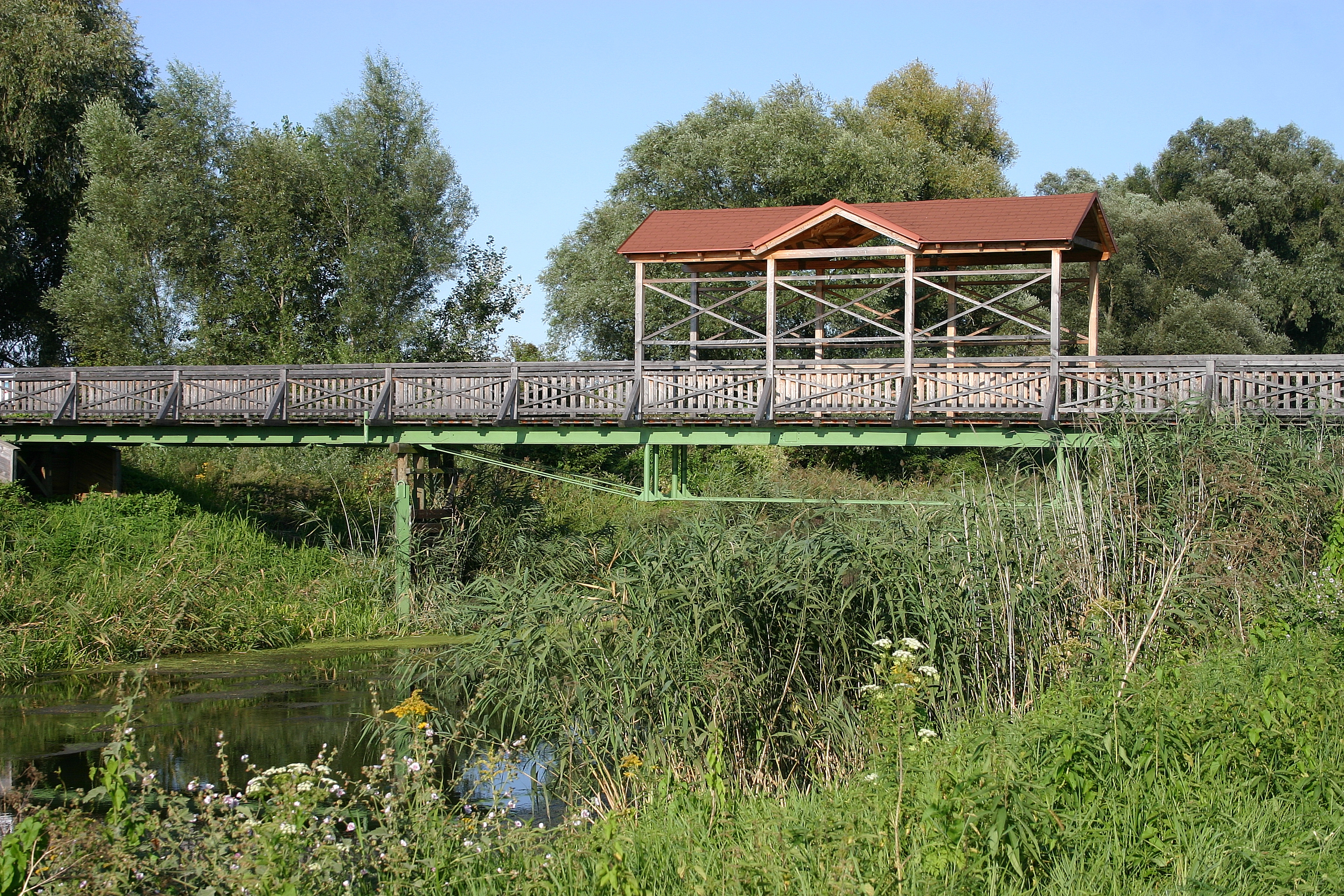
The Bridge at Andau today

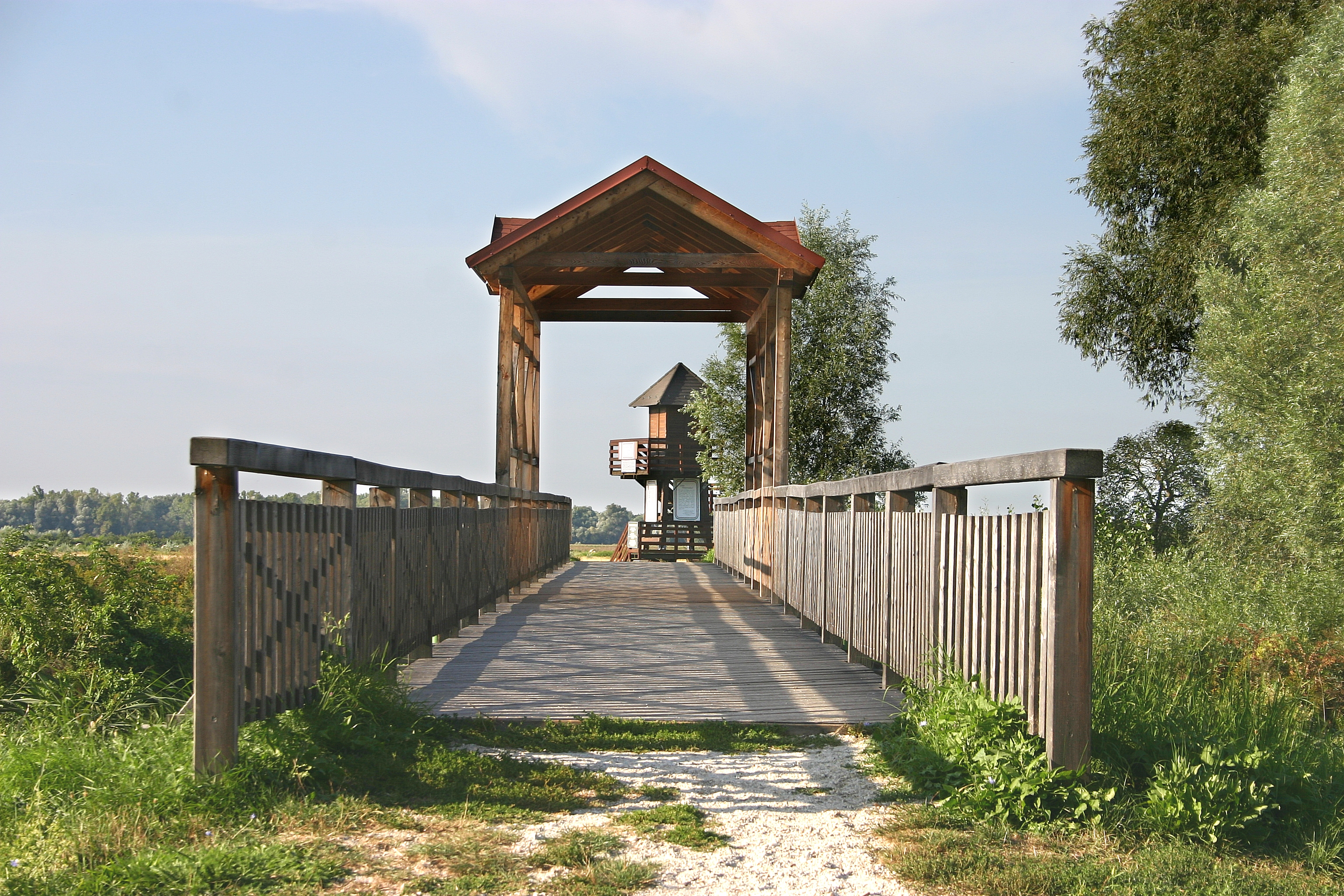
The Bridge at Andau looking to Austria from Hungary.

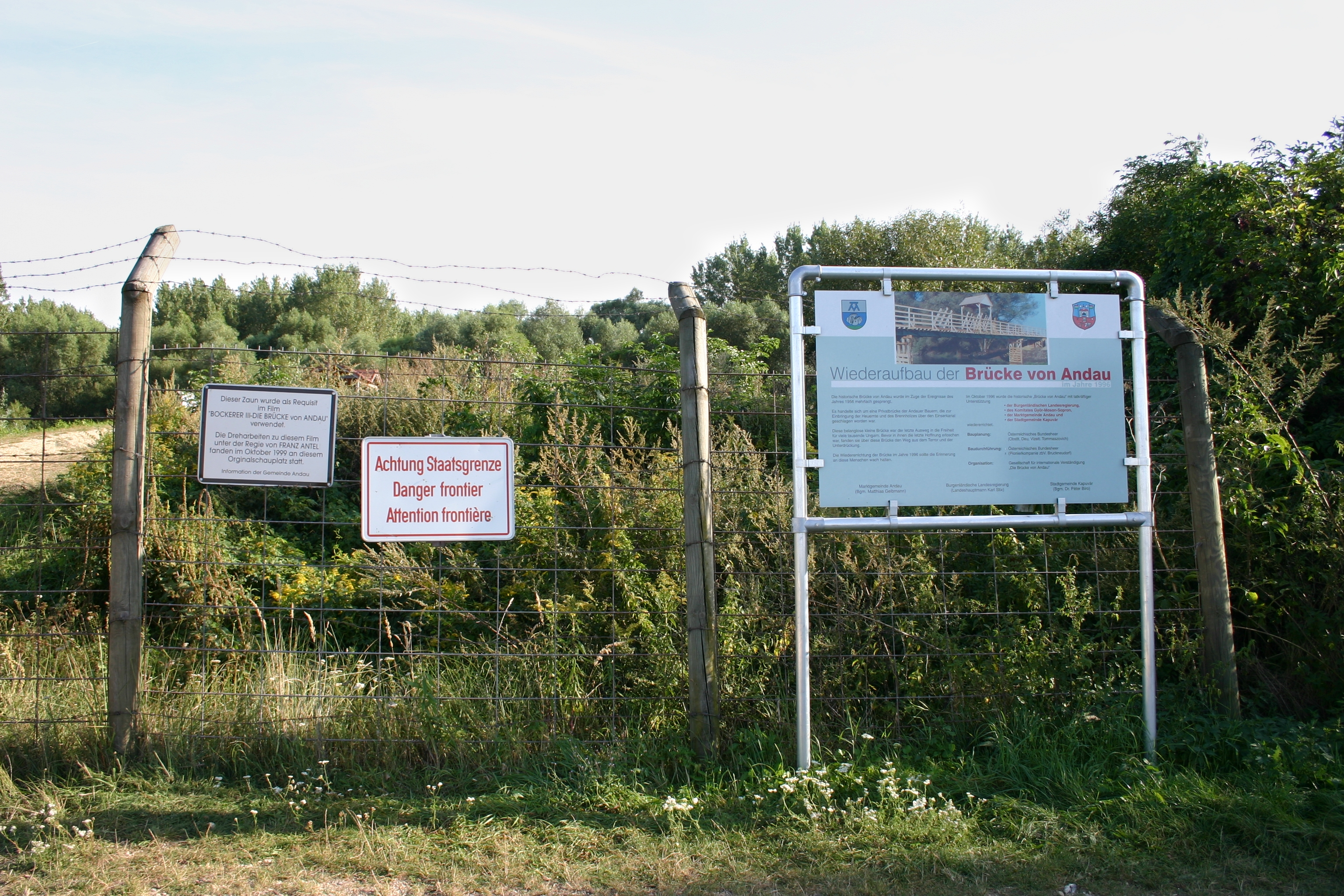
Backdrop for the film “Der Bockerer III”

The Brücke von Andau (Hungarian: Mosontarcsai híd or Andaui híd) is a small bridge over the Einserkanal / Hanság-főcsatorna, a small artificial river which forms part of the border between Austria and Hungary. It is located near to the village of Andau (Burgenland, Austria).

== History ==
With political turmoil in the People's Republic of Hungary during the summer and fall of 1956, more and more Hungarians fled to the west over the border to Austria. Even though it was just a small, wooden bridge over a small river, the bridge at Andau was the escape route for about 70,000 Hungarians during the Hungarian Revolution.

After crossing the border, fugitives had to walk a nine km (5.6 mi) long road, the "Road To Freedom" (Fluchtstraße), to the village of Andau, where they were received with great hospitality by the inhabitants of Andau and the surrounding villages.

On November 21, 1956, the bridge was blasted by Soviet troops.

== Today ==
In 1996, with the 40th anniversary of the Hungarian Revolution, the bridge was rebuilt as a symbol of tolerance and helpfulness. Organised as a joint operation by the Austrian and Hungarian armies, it replaced a stub bridge, which had been built by peasants for transportation reasons. At the same time, the Road Of Freedom was used as an open-air exhibition with the title "Road Of Woes", showing about ninety sculptures and other art works by Hungarian and Austrian artists. In 2006, the bridge had to be rebuilt, as it continues to face problems with the wood rotting on the bridge due to moisture.

== Literature and film ==
As a symbol of freedom, the bridge not only achieved fame with the book The Bridge at Andau by James Michener (1957), but also became a world-known memorial. The Bridge of Andau is also the topic of Der Bockerer III – Die Brücke von Andau, a 2000 Austrian movie dealing with the Hungarian Revolution in a slightly humorous manner, the third part of Der Bockerer.

== See also ==
- Pusztasomorja, Jánossomorja
- List of international bridges
