= My Lost Mexico =

1992 book by James A. Michener

- First edition
- Author: James Michener
- Language: English
- Genre: non-fiction
- Publisher: State House Press, Austin, Texas
- Publication date: 1992
- Publication place: United States
- Media type: Print (Hardback)
- Pages: 165pp.
- ISBN: 0-938349-93-7

My Lost Mexico (1992) is a nonfiction account by American author James A. Michener about his endeavor to write a big novel about Mexico in the grand style of his other popular novels like Hawaii. Michener relates the long journey of a novel which he had begun writing early in his career but had abandoned, and the manuscript had ultimately been lost. Its discovery 30 years later led to the 1992 bestseller Mexico. My Lost Mexico also includes the never-before published novella The Texas Girls.
