= Andau =

- Municipality
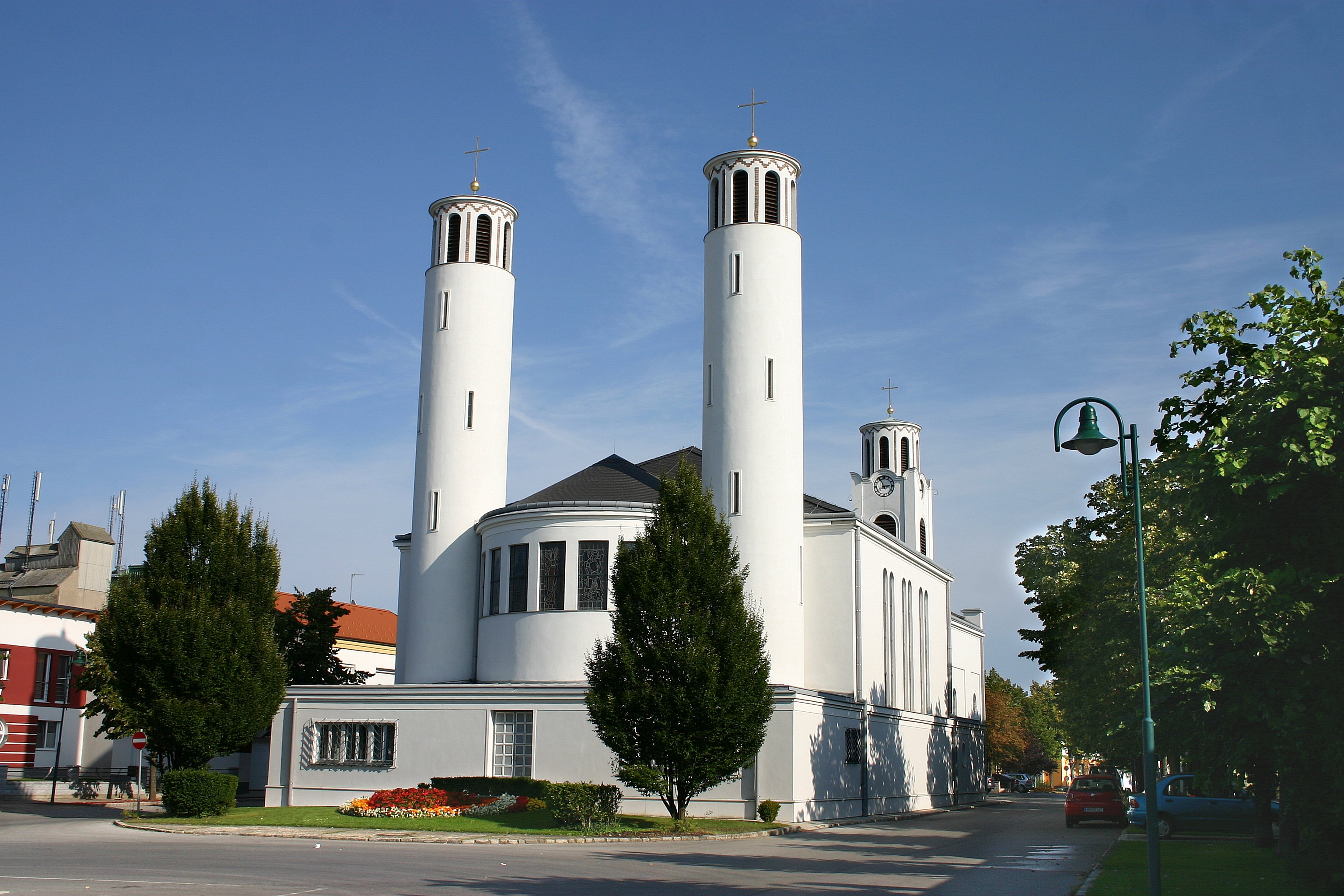
- Saint Nicholas Church

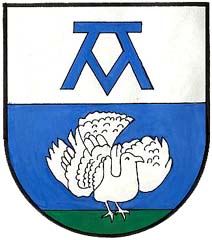
- Coat of arms

- Location within Burgenland Location within Austria
- Coordinates: 47°47′N 17°2′E
- Country: Austria
- State: Burgenland
- District: Neusiedl am See

Government
  - Mayor: Andreas Peck (ÖVP)

Area
  - Total: 47.3 km^{2} (18.3 sq mi)
- Elevation: 120 m (390 ft)

Population (2018-01-01)
  - Total: 2,285
  - Density: 48.3/km^{2} (125/sq mi)
- Time zone: UTC+1 (CET)
  - Summer (DST): UTC+2 (CEST)
- Postal code: 7163
- Website: https://www.andau-gemeinde.at/

Andau ((German pronunciation: [ˈandaʊ]), Hungarian: Mosontarcsa, Moson-Tarcsa), (Yiddish: Turcze) is a village in Burgenland, Austria, near the border of Hungary. It is situated in the flat, lake-studded Seewinkel region which is part of the Little Hungarian Plain.

== Name ==
The village was first mentioned in 1487 under the name Anthau al. nom. Zantho. Szántó means "plower, or tiller" in Hungarian. The German name was derived from the Hungarian one by dropping the first "z" : z'Antau - Antau - Andau. Another village in present-day Burgenland, Antau (Selegszántó) had a similar etymology. In 1525 it was mentioned as "Anthau das dorff". During the 17th century the Hungarian name changed from Szántó to Tarcsa, first recorded in 1659 as Tarcza, Tarcsa seu Andau in 1679 and Tarcsa seu Ontau ad Pratum in 1680. Tarcsa is an old personal name which appears often in Hungarian toponymy. From the 18th century onwards both names were used consistently. In the 19th century the village was called unofficially Moson-Tarcsa to show its location in Moson county. In 1904 the name was officially changed to Mosontarcsa. After 1923 the official name was changed to Andau.

== History ==
Andau and all of present-day Burgenland belonged to the Kingdom of Hungary until 1921 as part of the historical county of Moson. The village was first mentioned in 1487 under the name Zantho (with modern orthography Szántó). In the late Middle Ages the village belonged to the Magyaróvár estate. Szántó was destroyed two times by the invading Ottoman army, first in 1529, later in 1683.

The deserted village was re-settled in 1689 under the name Tarcsa. The first small Baroque chapel was built in 1747 and it was enlarged in the 19th and later in the 20th century. During the Hungarian Revolution of 1848 Tarcsa was plundered by Ban Josip Jelačić's troops.

The traditional way-of-life was shaped by the usage of natural resources of the region. According to Vályi's description from the end of the 18th century: "There is reed and rush growing in the lakes and the latter is used in mat weawing. The peasants sell their hay produce in Vienne."

According to a description from 1851: "Tarcsa or Andau is a German village in Moson county, near the Hanság, with 1037 Roman Catholic inhabitants and a parish church.... The villagers earn much money from hay and cartage services. The squire is Archduke Charles."

With the end of the First World War and the Treaties of St. Germain and Trianon, the territory was given to Austria, where it formed part of the new state of Burgenland.

During the Hungarian revolution of 1956, 70,000 refugees escaped the communist regime by crossing the border from Hungary into Austria over a small wooden bridge, called the Brücke von Andau. This was memorialized by James A. Michener in his book The Bridge at Andau. The event was also commemorated with a large painting by Ferenc Daday showing Richard Nixon greeting refugees. It is now in the Richard Nixon Presidential Library and Museum.

== Population ==
Andau/Tarcsa was populated by native German Heidebauer peasants with a small Hungarian minority during the 18th and 19th centuries. The population was steadily growing from 1787 until 1971 when it reached its historical peak with 3058 people. That time onwards the population went into a gradual decline, with a loss of about 500 people in 30 years. The decrease is caused by low birth rates and migration similarly to many rural communities in Europe.

Year	Total	Germans	Hungarians
1787	870	n/a	n/a
1869	1,751	n/a	n/a
1880	1,980	1,674	167
1890	1,987	1,730	249
1900	2,192	1,906	282
1910	2,397	2,068	304
1920	2,648	2,234	401
1923	2,388	2,217	167
1934	2,655	2,401	252
1939	3,033	n/a	n/a
1951	3,003	2,810	192
1961	3,011	2,913	91
1971	3,058	2,984	64
1981	2,766	2,729	21
1991	2,624	2,522	64
2001	2,514	2,410	49
2006	2,453	n/a	n/a

== Hungarians ==
Andau/Tarcsa was home of a small Hungarian community until the mid-20th century. The number of them was steadily growing in the second half of the 19th century until 1920 when it reached its historical peak with 401 people or about 15% of the whole population. After the Austrian take-over many Hungarians left the village and emigrated to Hungary, a fact reflected in the data of the first Austrian census in 1923.

The community had two distinct components: Hungarians living in the village itself and manorial workers living in Albrechtsfeld manor nearby. Albrechtsfeld (Albrechtmajor, Albertföld) was established in the 19th century by the squires of the Magyaróvár estate. It was inhabited by indentured agricultural workers, mainly Hungarians, coming from the Rábaköz region. Their archaic way-of-life remained basically unchanged until the mid-20th century. Lack of property and economic hardships caused rapid emigration from the 1950s. A sociological study from 1964 recorded the last phase of existence of this community. That time there were 48 families working on the estate but only 2 or 3 families lived in Albrechtsfeld. Older people bought houses in Andau village while the younger ones moved into the towns. The manor was dissolved in 1965 when this special minority group ceased to exist. The population of Albrechtsfeld was always included in the census data of Andau. Partial data from the 20th century:

Year	Total	Hungarians	Germans
1920	333	229	96
1934	293	219	73
1964	199	196	1

== Sights ==
- Saint Nicholas Church – The first Baroque chapel was built in 1747. It was rebuilt according to the plans of Peter Koch in 1829–31. A new wing was added in 1931 by Karl Holey. The original 19th-century tower and nave are Neo-Classical while the apse with the two round towers follows the Art Deco style. The furniture and the angel statues on the main altar were made in 1931. The huge fresco on the ceiling was painted in 1951. There is a cross from 1825 in front of the church.
- Brücke von Andau
- anni

== Coat-of-arms ==
The coat-of-arms of Andau were granted in 1992 when the village received the status of "Marktgemeinde".
