= Collectors, Forgers—and a Writer: A Memoir =

1983 memoir by James A. Michener

Collectors, Forgers – And A Writer: A Memoir
- Title page for Collectors, Forgers—and a Writer: A Memoir (1983)
- Author: James Michener
- Language: English
- Genre: Memoir
- Publisher: Targ Editions
- Publication date: 1983
- Publication place: United States
- Media type: Print
- Pages: 65pp.

Collectors, Forgers – And A Writer: A Memoir (1983) is a memoir written by American author James A. Michener.

A discussion of Michener's college years and some acquaintances and works that still influenced him later in his life and career.

Originally published by Targ Editions in 1983.

Republished in 1993 as a chapter of Literary Reflections.
