= The Watermen =

1979 novel by James A. Michener

- First edition
- Author: James A. Michener
- Illustrator: John Moll
- Language: English
- Publisher: Random House
- Publication date: July 24, 1979
- Publication place: United States
- Media type: print
- Pages: 193pp.
- ISBN: 0-394-50660-X

The Watermen is a 1979 book by American author James A. Michener. It contains excerpts from his larger novel, Chesapeake, which was published by Random House in 1978.
