= Caravans (film) =

1978 American film by James Fargo

- Directed by: James Fargo
- Screenplay by: Nancy Voyles Crawford; Thomas A. McMahon; Lorraine Williams
- Based on: Caravans (1963 novel) by James A. Michener
- Produced by: Elmo Williams
- Starring: Anthony Quinn; Behrouz Vossoughi; Michael Sarrazin; Christopher Lee; Jennifer O'Neill
- Cinematography: Douglas Slocombe
- Edited by: Richard Marden
- Music by: Mike Batt
- Production company: FIDCI; Ibex Films; Universal Pictures
- Distributed by: Universal Pictures
- Release date: November 2, 1978 (Radio City Music Hall)
- Running time: 127 minutes
- Countries: United States; Iran
- Languages: English; Persian
- Budget: $10 million
- Box office: $1.965 million (US-Canada rentals)

Caravans is a 1978 adventure drama film directed by James Fargo and starring Anthony Quinn, Jennifer O'Neill, Michael Sarrazin, Christopher Lee and Behrouz Vossoughi. It is based on the 1963 novel by James A. Michener.

The film was an international co-production between the United States and the Imperial State of Iran, and was filmed on-location in Iran. It was released by Universal Pictures on November 2, 1978.

== Plot ==
The story is set in the fictional Middle Eastern country of Zadestan in 1948. Mark Miller is stationed at the American Embassy in the ]city of Kashkhan. He is assigned to investigate the disappearance of a young woman, Ellen Jasper, the daughter of a United States senator, who vanished after her marriage to Colonel Nazrullah several months previously. Nazrullah is desperate to find her and becomes defensive when Miller asks about her, insisting that he never laid a hand on her. By law, Ellen has relinquished her US citizenship upon marrying him. Miller traces her to a band of nomads led by Zulffiqar, who are illegal gun-runners. She doesn't want to leave, being estranged from both her parents and her husband; her parents having forced her into an arranged and loveless marriage. Miller doesn't want to return without proof she's alive and well, which she refuses to give. Nazrullah lures the gun-runners into a trap. He separates Miller from the nomads and asks his wife to return to him, but she refuses. At last, Ellen gives Miller a note for her family. As the nomads leave, Nazrullah orders his troops to fire on them, and Ellen is killed trying to rescue a child. A heartbroken Nazrullah carries away the body of his dead wife.

== Cast ==
- Anthony Quinn as Zulffiqar
- Michael Sarrazin as Mark Miller
- Christopher Lee as Sardar Khan
- Jennifer O'Neill as Ellen Jasper
- Behrouz Vossoughi as Colonel Nazrullah
- Joseph Cotten as Crandall
- Barry Sullivan as Richardson
- Jeremy Kemp as Dr. Smythe
- Duncan Quinn as Moheb
- Behrouz Gramian as Peasant Boy
- Mohammad-Ali Keshavarz as Shakkur
- Parviz Gharib-Afshar as Nur Mohammad
- Fahimeh Amouzandeh as Mira
- Mohammad Kahnemoui as Maftoon
- Khosrow Tabatabai as Dancing Boy

== Production ==
In the 1967 MGM Lionpower featurette, it was advertised as one of many coming attractions in development at the time. MGM later dropped out of the film's distribution. Universal later distributed the film.

This was the final theatrical film role of Barry Sullivan.

=== Changes from the source novel ===
The film was not well received by James Michener, as it strayed wildly from the plot of his book, even eliminating its main character, a Nazi war criminal on the run who falls in love with the female lead. The original novel is set in Afghanistan, while the film is set in the fictional "Zadestan".

== Reception ==
Harold C. Schonberg of The New York Times panned the film as a "fake epic", adding: "It has a fabricated plot, based on the James Michener novel, it has bad acting, it has unbelievably inane dialogue, and it has every cliché in the books, including an ending with the caravan silhouetted against the sunset. Even so reliable an actor as Anthony Quinn looks idiotic; he displays his macho by grunts and muttering, and occasionally there is a peculiar look on his face that suggests what he really thinks of all this nonsense". Variety wrote: "The main trouble with Caravans isn't the Iranians, it's Hollywood. Almost every fake moment in the film, and there are lots of them, has the touch of Hollywood laid on with a heavy coating. Take away the Americans, of course, and you wouldn't have such a slick film, but you might have a more honest one". Roger Ebert of the Chicago Sun-Times gave the film two stars out of four and wrote that it was "slow and obvious, and at the end rather pointless", but "if you're facing a slow Sunday afternoon with a lot of time before the roast is done, Caravans could, in its own way, be fun". Gene Siskel of the Chicago Tribune gave the film one star out of four and called it "a thoroughly laughable desert adventure" with the relationship between Quinn and O'Neill getting "short shrift" and the movie lacking "an action scene of any merit. Only at the very end is there a battle of sorts. But director James Fargo ... shoots these scenes in boring medium shots. They are as exciting as if they had been shot with models in a sandbox". Kevin Thomas of the Los Angeles Times called the film "a stirring romantic epic on a grand scale marred by patches of truly terrible dialogue. As a result, despite all that this Universal release has going for it in the way of visual splendor and high adventure, it is likely to be entertaining only for the least discriminating (or most indulgent)". Gary Arnold of The Washington Post wrote: "Caravans will be lucky if it's remembered as an expensive flop ... Ironically, the film's emptiness is magnified by the contrast between its drab, flimsy plot and vast, majestic landscapes. Caravans is too inert to be salvaged by the photogenic advantages of impressive scenery". Tim Pulleine of The Monthly Film Bulletin wrote that "Ellen's twofold defection remains resolutely undramatised and the gun-running sub-plot is mainly demoted to a few cryptic reference to off-screen action. The movie thus becomes a tiresome exercise in anti-climax".

== Soundtrack ==
Mike Batt wrote the score, which has been the most successful element of the film; the album remained a bestseller for many years after the film's release. The main instrumental, "Theme From Caravans", has been widely used in the media, for example, by East German ice skater Katarina Witt in her World Championship-winning routine. It was also arranged as a march (marcha mora) for the Moors and Christians festival in Villena (Spain), as it served as the opening theme for the annual radio program dedicated to that festival since its first broadcast in 1983. The vocal song "Caravan Song" was written by Mike Batt and sung by the British singer Barbara Dickson. It peaked at No. 41 in the UK charts and was included on her album All for a Song.
