= James A. Michener's Texas =

1994 American television miniseries

- Also known as: Texas
- Genre: Historical fiction
- Based on: Texas by James A. Michener
- Screenplay by: Sean Meredith
- Directed by: Richard Lang
- Starring: Patrick Duffy; Stacy Keach; Chelsea Field; Rick Schroder; Grant Show; David Keith; John Schneider; María Conchita Alonso; Benjamin Bratt
- Narrated by: Charlton Heston
- Composer: Lee Holdridge

Production
- Executive producers: Aaron Spelling; E. Duke Vincent; John Wilder
- Producers: Shelley Hull; Cheryl R. Stein
- Production locations: Brackettville, Texas; Del Rio, Texas; Alamo Village - Highway 674, Brackettville, Texas
- Cinematography: Neil Roach
- Running time: 180 minutes
- Production companies: ABC; Branded Productions; Spelling Entertainment

Original release
- Network: ABC
- Release: April 16 – April 18, 1995

James A. Michener's Texas (also called Texas) is a 1994 ABC television miniseries directed by Richard Lang. It was adapted from the 1985 historical fiction novel Texas by James A. Michener, but includes only the section of the book related to Texas Independence and the Battle of San Jacinto. The novel is more wide-ranging, starting with Spanish explorer Álvar Núñez Cabeza de Vaca and ending in the modern day.

== Plot ==
The year is 1821. The vast, unsettled territory that will one day be known as Texas still belongs to Mexico. But the forces that will shape the future of this land have already been set in motion. It begins with Mexico's General Santa Anna and turns into an armed revolt led by Sam Houston, Stephen Austin, and the heroes of the Alamo: Davy Crockett and Jim Bowie.

Set against the backdrop of America's turbulent frontier, Texas explores conflict, romance, and adventure. It's the story of a fight for freedom and statehood - and of the soldiers, settlers, outlaws and empire-builders caught up in their young homeland's quest to fulfill its destiny.

== Cast ==
- Patrick Duffy as Stephen F. Austin
- Stacy Keach as Sam Houston
- Chelsea Field as Mattie Quimper
- Rick Schroder as Otto McNab
- Grant Show as William B. Travis
- David Keith as James Bowie
- John Schneider as Davy Crockett
- María Conchita Alonso as Lucia
- Benjamin Bratt as Benito Garza
- Frederick Coffin as Zave (credited as Fred Coffin)
- Anthony Michael Hall as Yancey Quimper
- Randy Travis as Captain Sam Garner
- Daragh O'Malley as McNab
- Miguel Sandoval as General Martin Perfecto de Cos
- Lloyd Battista as General Antonio Lopez de Santa Anna
- Lonnie Schuyler as James Bonham
- Joe Torrenueva as Lopez
- Esteban Powell as Young Yancey
- Sully Ross as Young Otto
- Russ McCubbin as "Panther" Komax
- Roland Rodriguez as Juan Seguin
- Woody Watson as R.J. Poteet
- Deborah Nunez as Josephine Garza
- Lanell Pena as Maria Trinidad Garza
- Morgan Redmond as Father Clooney

The film is narrated by Charlton Heston. Aaron Spelling was the executive producer.

== Release ==
Although produced for television, Texas was released on home video first. This decision was not due to its quality, but to recoup its $12 million production cost feasibly as broadcast networks had shied away from expensive productions.
