= Dick Berg =

American film producer

Richard Berg (February 16, 1922 – September 1, 2009) was an American screenwriter as well as a film and television producer. Among his credits is the 1985 miniseries Space and Wallenberg: A Hero's Story.

== Biography ==
Berg was born in New York City and raised in New Rochelle, New York. After graduating from Lehigh University in 1942, Berg went west to Hollywood to pursue a career in acting or producing and found work as a dialogue coach for Roy Rogers and other cowboy actors at Republic Pictures. Berg died on September 1, 2009, after falling at his home in Los Angeles. He was 87.
