= The Voice of Asia =

1951 book by James A. Michener

The Bridge at Andau
- First US edition
- Author: James A. Michener
- Language: English
- Publisher: Random House
- Publication date: 1951
- Publication place: United States
- Media type: print (Hardback)
- Pages: 245pp.

The Voice of Asia (1951) is a work of non-fiction published by American author James A. Michener. The book chronicles his travels throughout Asia, detailing the cultures and lives of locals in areas such as Japan, Korea, Hong Kong, Singapore, Pakistan, Burma, India, Thailand, etc.

"Today Asia is of utmost importance to Americans. What happens there may make or mar us as a nation. We need to know what makes Asia tick. I had the good luck to travel to many towns and villages in Asia and to talk with the people about what worried them. I met rickshaw boys and millionaires, peasant farmers and heads of state. They told me about the religious problems, the economic questions and the social revolutions that disturb them today. I talked of America and of Russia; and, like people everywhere, they told me some very funny stories about their politicians. In 'The Voice of Asia' I have tried to share with you what the people of Asia told me." --James A. Michener
