= Caribbean (novel) =

Novel by James A. Michener

- First edition cover
- Author: James Michener
- Language: English
- Genre: Historical
- Publisher: Random House
- Publication date: 1989
- Publication place: United States
- Media type: Print (hardback)
- Pages: 672pp.
- ISBN: 0-394-56561-4

Caribbean (1989) is a historical novel written by James A. Michener, which describes and explores the history of the Caribbean region from the pre-Columbian period of the native Arawak tribes until about 1990.

The author mixes fact and fiction, as he notes in the foreword. For example, the story about the island of All Saints is purely fictional, though the book's map shows it as an island in the location of Saint Lucia.

In researching the book, Michener traveled the Caribbean for three years and consulted over 400 books.

== Chapter Summary ==
1. A Hedge of Croton: the invasion of the Caribs in the Arawak homelands.
2. Death of Greatness: the classic Mayan Period.
3. Christopher Columbus in Hispaniola: the trial of Christopher Columbus after his ruthless rule of Hispaniola.
4. The Spanish Lake: the adventures of Sir Francis Drake.
5. Big Storms in Little England: history of Barbados.
6. The Buccaneer: stories of Henry Morgan and English privateers.
7. The Sugar Interest: a fictional story that revolves around the island St. John's and the Caribbean sugar monopoly.
8. A Wedding on Nevis: the accounts of Horatio Nelson.
9. The Creoles: a history of Guadeloupe, a French colony.
10. The Tortured Land: Haiti and the Haitian Revolution.
11. Marshal Law: the Morant Bay rebellion and following legal battle between John Stuart Mill and Alfred Tennyson.
12. Letters of Introduction: a fictional account of "All Saints Island" and a Caribbean perspective of the pre-World War II relationship between United Kingdom and Germany.
13. The Scholar: a fictional story of a young Trinidadian scholar who leaves the University of West Indies to stay in Miami shortly after the Cuban exile wave of immigration.
14. The Rasta Man: a fictional story of a young Rastafarian whose travels to All Saint's Island revolve around the Caribbean obsession over the sport of cricket.
15. Twins: a fictional story of two Cuban refugees returning to Cuba, which culminates in their meeting with Fidel Castro.
16. The Golden Sea: a character meets descendants and other characters from previous chapters.
