= Space (miniseries) =

- Also known as: James A. Michener's Space
- Genre: Miniseries
- Based on: Space by James A. Michener
- Written by: James A. Michener; Richard Berg; Stirling Silliphant
- Directed by: Lee Philips; Joseph Sargent
- Starring: James Garner; Beau Bridges; Blair Brown; Bruce Dern; Harry Hamlin; Michael York
- Music by: Tony Berg; Miles Goodman
- Country of origin: United States
- Original language: English

Production
- Executive producer: Richard Berg
- Producer: Martin Manulis
- Cinematography: Héctor R. Figueroa (episodes 1, 5, 6); Gayne Rescher (episodes 2–4)
- Editors: Donald R. Rode; Patrick Kennedy; George Jay Nicholson
- Running time: 780 minutes
- Production company: Paramount Television

Original release
- Network: CBS
- Release: April 14 – April 18, 1985

Space (also known as James A. Michener's Space) is a 1985 American television miniseries starring James Garner as Sen. Norman Grant. It is based on the 1982 novel of the same name by James A. Michener that aired on CBS. Like the novel, the miniseries is a fictionalised history of the United States space program.

Space won an Emmy Award, for film sound mixing. It originally aired from April 14 through 18, 1985, and consisted of five parts running a total of 13 hours. In subsequent showings, it was cut to nine hours.

== Characters ==
Norman Grant (James Garner) is a former war hero turned senator who tirelessly promotes the American space program despite almost insurmountable opposition. Other principal players include John Pope (Harry Hamlin), who, after failing to win his way to Annapolis, matriculates from a Navy recruit to a naval officer, Naval Aviator, test pilot and pioneering astronaut in the company of fellow space-traveler Randy Claggett (Beau Bridges); Penny Hardesty Pope (Blair Brown), an ambitious and beautiful counsel to Senator Grant since his election and wife of John Pope; Leopold Strabismus (David Dukes), a hedonistic wheeler-dealer who hopes to capitalize on the 1947 UFO scare; German rocket scientist Dieter Kolff (Michael York), whose ideals (or lack thereof) are put to the test when he shifts his allegiance from the Nazis to the Americans; and Stanley Mott (Bruce Dern), an aeronautical engineer whose secret assignment is to make certain that men like Kolff aren't snatched up by the Soviets after the fall of Germany.

== Cast and crew ==
=== Cast ===
- James Garner as Norman Grant
- Beau Bridges as Randy Claggett
- Blair Brown as Penny Hardesty Pope
- Bruce Dern as Stanley Mott
- Harry Hamlin as John Pope
- Michael York as Rocket Scientist Dieter Kolff
- James Sutorious as Tim Finnerty
- Melinda Dillon as Rachel Mott
- Martin Balsam as Senator Glancey
- Barbara Sukowa as Liesel Kolff
- Susan Anspach as Elinor Grant
- Stephanie Faracy as Debbie Dee Claggett
- David Dukes as Leopold Strabismus / Martin Scorcella
- G.D. Spradlin as Tucker Thomas
- Dick Anthony Williams as Gawain Butler
- Les Lannom as Larry Penzoss
- Richard Delmonte as Ramirez
- Charles Tyner as "Dracula"
- Jennifer Runyon as Marcia Grant
- David Spielberg as Skip Morgan
- Maggie Han as Cindy Rhee
- Ralph Bellamy as Paul Stidham
- Clu Gulager as Victor Hardesty
- Shane Rimmer as General Quigley
- Bert Remsen as Ed Specktor
- Wolf Kahler as Funkhauser
- Mary Jackson as Frankie
- Murphy Dunne as Lt. Wiles
- Richard F. Gordon Jr. as CapCom
- Bill Morey as NYU Dean Robert Hawkins
- Michael Talbott as Tom Savage
- James Avery as Jean-Marie
- Roscoe Lee Browne as Farquar
- Laurence Luckinbill as Narrator

=== Production credits ===
- Lee Philips (Director)
- Joseph Sargent (Director)
- Allan Marcil (Producer)
- Martin Manulis (Producer)
- Dick Berg (Executive Producer, Screenwriter)
- Stirling Silliphant (Screenwriter)
- Hector R. Figueroa (Cinematographer)
- Gayne Rescher (Cinematographer
- Donald R. Rode (Editor)
- Patrick Kennedy (Editor)
- George Jay Nicholson (Editor)
- Lionel Couch (Art Director)
- Tony Berg (Composer - Music Score)
- Miles Goodman (Composer - Music Score)
- Joseph Jennings (Production Designer)
- Paul Corbould (Special Effects)

== Awards ==
- 1985: Emmy Award, Outstanding Film Sound Mixing for a Limited Series or a Special
- 1985: Emmy Award nominee, Outstanding Limited Series
- 1986: Artios Award nominee, Best Casting for TV Miniseries

Preceded by The Day After	Emmy Award for Outstanding Film Sound Editing for a Limited Series or a Special; 1985	Succeeded by An Early Frost
