= The World Is My Home =

Book by James A. Michener

The World Is My Home: A Memoir
- First edition
- Author: James Michener
- Language: English
- Genre: Autobiography
- Publisher: Random House
- Publication date: 1992
- Publication place: United States
- Media type: Print (Hardback, Paperback)
- Pages: 528
- ISBN: 978-0-8129-7813-1

The World Is My Home: A Memoir (1992) is an autobiography written by James A. Michener, first published by Random House.

Beginning with his time in the South Pacific, the subject of and location where he wrote his first book, Michener ranges through the course of his life by the subjects that affected him. Michener provides insight into his discovery of the locations he would later write about including Espiritu Santo and Bali Ha'i from Tales of the South Pacific.
