= Texas (novel) =

1985 novel by James A. Michener

- First edition cover
- Author: James Michener (1907-1997)
- Language: English
- Genre: Historical novel
- Publisher: Random House
- Publication date: 1985
- Publication place: United States
- Media type: Print (Hardback)
- Pages: 1096pp.
- ISBN: 0-394-54154-5

Texas is a 1985 novel by American writer James A. Michener (1907–1997), based on the history of Texas. Characters include real and fictional characters spanning hundreds of years, such as explorers, Spanish colonists, American immigrants, German Texan settlers, ranchers, oil men, aristocrats, Chicanos, and others, all based on extensive historical research.

== Background ==
Michener did extensive research on the novel in Texas, receiving much support from the state government. Governor Bill Clements offered him access to numerous state archives and research staff at the University of Texas at Austin. Michener rented 3506 Mt. Bonnell Road for $1 per year to write the manuscript.

At 1,076 pages, it was the longest Michener novel published by Random House. Given the success of his previous novels, the company did a first printing of 750,000 copies, 'the largest in the company's history'.

== Chapters ==
The book is divided into an introduction and 14 subsequent chapters:

The Governor's Task Force - Provides a fictional account of the setting up of a group in 1983 to write a report encouraging an interest in Texas history on the eve of the sesquicentenary in 1986. Each chapter traces the events and lives of key characters then ends with a return to the present time alongside some analysis of the themes covered.

1. Land of Many Lands - Introduces the early Mexican expeditions of Cabeza de Vaca, Fray Marcos, and Coronado in the 1530s and 1540s. Other elements include Esteban, Isla de Malhado, the Seven Cities of Cibola, Quivira, El Turco, the Requerimiento, and The Black Legend.
2. The Mission - Covers the era in the 18th century of evangelism by Franciscans, the construction of missions and presidio (i.e. Presidio San Antonio de Béxar), and settlement by Spanish (i.e. Canary Islanders led by Juan Leal Goras), criollo, and mestizo immigrants in central and north-eastern New Spain. Other elements include matchmaking paseo, land acquisition, conflicts in Apacheria and Comancheria, relations with French Louisiana, and Catholic martydom.
3. El Camino Real - Explains the weakening of the missions in the late 18th century and how "The Royal Road" running through San Antonio linked the barren north with the more prosperous south of Spanish Texas. The early focus on casta, particularly by the Spanish-born class, influenced marriage and land ownership, contrasting with the culture of the non-Spanish entering the area from the north.
4. The Settlers - Details the ongoing influx of settlers from the north in the 1820s. Crossing the Neutral Ground, immigrants were often attracted by empresario (such as Stephen F. Austin) but had to submit to Catholicism in order to settle. Many brought with them strong convictions about freedom, government, and religion. Conflict over land with natives (such as the Karankawa) also ensued, leading to their eventual displacement.
5. The Trace - By the early 1830s, the Mississippi and the Natchez Trace (where Meriweather Lewis died) became organized routes for migration and trade to Texas, slowly becoming more settled and less lawless. The influence of Scots-Irish Protestants is highlighted—particularly in land settlement (i.e. league and a labor grants) and early industry (selling horses and cattle to New Orleans) alongside the local Mexicans.
6. Three Men, Three Battles - Traces the events leading up to the Texas Revolution of 1835–1836, a rebellion of Texians and Tejanos resisting the centralist government of Mexico. The campaign north by Santa Anna results in clashes at the Alamo Mission in Béxar and near the Presidio La Bahía in Goliad. Despite the general chaos, rivalry, and indecision shown by the various commanders, including Sam Houston's Runaway Scrape, the decisive battle at San Jacinto secures independence.
7. The Texians - Covers the formative and chaotic period of the Republic of Texas (1836–1845) and the ongoing skirmishes across the Nueces Strip. Governing the new nation was difficult given its size and formative legal institutions. The presidencies of Sam Houston and Mirabeau B. Lamar are detailed against increasing tensions with native tribes (see Texas Cherokees, Council House Fight, and Great Raid of 1840) and Mexicans. The arrival of German Texan settlers help the developing industry and agriculture sectors.
8. The Ranger - After being granted statehood, the Mexican-American War (1846–1848) erupts as a result of historical border tensions and a failed attempt to purchase the region. Various battles are covered as is the return from exile of Santa Anna. Texas forces (i.e. the Texas Rangers) join the US force under General Zachary Taylor, and although brave, they prove to be ill-disciplined and prone to vengeance against Mexicans.
9. Loyalties - Covers the late period of the Antebellum South to the end of the American Civil War. It highlights the fundamental influence that the Old South had on the "New South" (including Texas), from agriculture (cotton), the export economy, to labor (slavery), and social and political attitudes. It also outlines the impact of the Vicksburg campaign and Union blockade on families and increasing tensions due to the Emancipation Proclamation.
10. The Fort - Highlights the shift in focus in post-war Texas to the frontier and conflicts with native tribes over land and resources (such as water and buffalo). As settlers moved increasingly to the west, forts followed to provide security. The book introduces Buffalo Soldiers of the 10th Cavalry and Benjamin Grierson, cultural prejudices, and the slow erosion of native resistance and inevitable resettlement.
11. The Frontier - Covers the late 1870s–1880s as attention turned to developing settlements and land holdings. Cattle drives and droving became a significant way to profit from the extension west of railroad heads (primarily Abilene and Dodge City), as did the cross breeding of longhorns with imported herefords to increase sale values. The introduction of barbed wire, to enclose land and water resources, led to several range wars.
12. The Town - Moves the narrative to 1900 and the devastating arrival of the boll weevil. It explains the particularly strong and local nature of Protestantism in Texas. It also highlights voter fraud and collusion as an element in local politics as well as the revival of the KKK as a local moral force. The discovery of oil changes the nature of the Texas economy while the development of high school football affects local sports culture.
13. The Invaders - The focus of the novel moves to the 1960s and illegal immigration (and border patrol) along the Mexican border alongside the regional economic activity supported by immigrants. It contrasts with internal migration and relocation from declining economic regions such as Detroit. The inevitable spread north of the nine-banded armadillo is also detailed as another 'invader'. The rise of seasonal hunting and aquifer irrigation is also explained.
14. Power and Change - Covers the first half of the 1980s, including the early 1980s recession, where oil prices fell and office space in major cities became over supplied. Other themes include Texas' influence on national politics, the Ogallala Aquifer depletion, regular regional droughts, and longhorn sales. The ongoing changes in Texas universities are covered as is the establishment of notable art museums (e.g., Kimbell Art Museum in Fort Worth).

== Reception ==
Texas Monthly did not like the novel, awarding Michener its 'Bum Steer of the Year Award' (given to people who have done something to merit ridicule or embarrassment) for the work's "hackneyed dialogue" and "tendency to resort to stereotypes". The magazine, however, made peace with Michener later.

== Adaptations ==
The novel was adapted as a 1994 made-for-TV movie of the same name, directed by Richard Lang and featuring actors Stacy Keach, Benjamin Bratt, Rick Schroder, and Patrick Duffy.
