= Space (Michener novel) =

1982 novel by James A. Michener

- First edition cover
- Author: James A. Michener
- Illustrator: Jean Paul Tremblay (cartography)
- Language: English
- Publisher: Random House
- Publication date: 1982
- Publication place: United States
- Pages: 622
- ISBN: 0-394-50555-7
- OCLC: 8493271

Space is a novel by James A. Michener published in 1982. It is a fictionalized history of the United States space program, with a particular emphasis on human spaceflight.

Michener writes in a semi-documentary style. The topics explored in the novel include naval warfare in the Pacific Ocean, air combat in the Korean War (something Michener had already explored in The Bridges at Toko-Ri), test pilot life at 'Pax River', astronaut selection and training, the role of the media in promoting the space program as a national achievement, and the development of the Gemini and Apollo spacecraft, the rise of the military-industrial complex and the evolution of NACA into NASA.

== Plot summary ==
The story begins in 1944 and covers more than 30 years in the lives of four men and their families: Dieter Kolff, a German rocket engineer who worked for the Nazis; Norman Grant, a World War II hero turned U.S. Senator from the fictional Midwestern state of Fremont; Stanley Mott, an aeronautical engineer charged with a top-secret U.S. government mission to rescue Kolff from Peenemünde; and John Pope, a small-town boy turned Naval Aviator who becomes a test pilot and then an astronaut. Randy Claggett, a rambunctious Marine Corps aviator and astronaut, is considered by Michener to be the most important supporting character (the first two parts of the book are entitled "Four Men" and "Four Women"). The lives of the fictional characters interweave with those of historical figures, such as Wernher von Braun and Lyndon Johnson. A group of trainee astronauts are introduced to fly fictional but plausible Project Gemini and Project Apollo missions; the intensive training and jockeying for position among the astronauts forms much of the background of the middle of the novel, reminiscent of a fictional version of Tom Wolfe's The Right Stuff and the movie as well.

Michener dramatizes the life experiences of these men and their families against the backdrop of the real history of the U.S. space program, depicting their experiences in post-war aviation; the space race between the United States and the Soviet Union; the development of congressional funding for the space program; the early failures in the Gemini program; and the successful Moon landings in the Apollo program. In a fictional postscript to history, Michener creates a last, "Apollo 18" launch to further the drama of Pope, Claggett and Linley, America's first black astronaut. This is the only Apollo mission in which the lunar module lands on the far side of the Moon; in order to remain in contact with NASA after landing, while still in lunar orbit the Apollo craft must launch communication satellites that will bounce the lunar module's signals to Earth. An exceptional and unexpected burst of sunspot activity results in the death of Claggett and Linley: the two astronauts are exposed to a lethal level of radiation while out on the lunar surface during a large solar flare. After hastily returning to the Lunar Module, Linley loses consciousness and Claggett attempts an emergency ascent back towards the command module. However he also loses consciousness, and the Lunar Module crashes back onto the lunar surface. Pope, the command module pilot, returns to Earth safely. The mission profile is significantly different from that of the real-world canceled mission that would have been Apollo 18.

On the human side, various subplots run through the novel, contrasting the "official" heroism of NASA with the human fallibilities of the cast—the difficulties the Kolffs face in integrating into American society; Norman Grant's initial embrace of the space program and his abandonment of it as it no longer serves his political aims, while his unstable wife and their daughter fall in with a highly intelligent but cynical cult leader calling himself Leopold Strabismus, who exploits first the UFO craze and then an anti-scientific creationist agenda to increase his wealth; Randy Claggett's womanizing; the contrast between Stanley and Rachel Mott's ordered, rational existence and their troubled relationship with their sons, and John Pope's unusual yet supportive relationship with his lawyer wife Penny.

Pope retires from NASA and becomes a respected professor of astronomy, his wife Penny is elected to the Senate, and Mott is consulted on "Grand Tour" uncrewed missions to the outer Solar System, as well as the development of the Space Shuttle. The novel ends with a NASA workshop on the possibility of extraterrestrial life, at which Strabismus drops the creationist/fundamentalist persona he has adopted and joins in the intellectual debate on the inevitability of life elsewhere in the Universe.

== History, geography and current science ==
The author displays extensive knowledge about the intricacies of rocket and spacecraft systems, which he gained as a member of the Advisory Council to the National Aeronautics and Space Administration from 1979 to 1983.

== Television adaptation ==
The novel was adapted into a five-part, 13-hour CBS miniseries, James A. Michener's Space, starring James Garner. This television series aired April 14–18, 1985 and won an Emmy Award for film sound mixing. Two years later CBS reran it as a re-edited four-part 9-hour weekly series during July 1987.
