= South Pacific (2001 film) =

2001 television film directed by Richard Pearce

- DVD cover
- Genre: Musical; Romance; Comedy drama War
- Based on: South Pacific (1949 musical) by Oscar Hammerstein II Joshua Logan; Tales of the South Pacific (1947 collection) by James A. Michener
- Screenplay by: Joshua Logan; Lawrence D. Cohen
- Directed by: Richard Pearce
- Starring: Glenn Close; Harry Connick Jr. Rade Sherbedgia
- Music by: Richard Rodgers (songs); Michael Small
- Country of origin: United States
- Original language: English

Production
- Executive producer: Howard Braunstein; Glenn Close; Lawrence D. Cohen; Michael Gore; Michael Jaffe
- Producer: Christine A. Sacani
- Production location: Port Douglas, Australia; Moʼorea, French Polynesia
- Cinematography: Stephen F. Windon
- Editor: Lynzee Klingman
- Running time: 129 minutes
- Production companies: Trillium Productions; White Cap Productions; Jaffe/Braunstein Films, Ltd. Touchstone Television

Original release
- Network: ABC
- Release: March 26, 2001

South Pacific (also known as Rodgers & Hammerstein's South Pacific) is a 2001 American romantic musical television film based on the 1949 stage musical of the same name, itself an adaptation of James A. Michener's 1947 book Tales of the South Pacific.

Directed by Richard Pearce, the film stars Glenn Close, Harry Connick Jr. and Rade Sherbedgia. The screenplay, adapted by Joshua Logan (who directed the previous 1958 film version) and Lawrence D. Cohen, tells the story of a war-torn romance between a young American nurse (Close) and an older French plantation owner (Sherbedgia).

The film premiered on March 26, 2001 on ABC to mixed critical reviews, praising its performances but criticizing changes to the source material. At the 53rd Primetime Emmy Awards, the film was nominated for Outstanding Music Direction and Outstanding Sound Mixing for a Limited or Anthology Series or Movie.

== Cast ==
- Glenn Close as Ensign Nellie Forbush
- Harry Connick Jr. as Lt. Joseph Cable
- Rade Sherbedgia as Émile de Becque
- Jack Thompson as Capt. George Brackett
- Lori Tan Chinn as Bloody Mary
- Ilene Graff as Dinah Cuthbert
- Natalie Mendoza as Liat
- Simon Burke as Cmdr. William Harbison
- Steve Bastoni as Lt. Buzz Adams
- Kimberley Davies as Luann
- Robert Pastorelli as Luther Billis
- Craig Ball as Austin
- Damon Herriman as Professor
- Salvatore Coco as DeVito
- Peter Lamb as Bruno
- Steve Le Marquand as Stewpot
- Simon Pryce as Bass Sergeant
- Henri Szeps as Benoit

== Production ==
Principal photography took place primarily in Australia, with some scenes shot in Moorea, an island close to Tahiti.

Several new scenes, such as Nellie and Emile's first meeting at the officer's club, were added, and a new character was created to serve as Nellie's best friend and confidante. The sex scenes between Liat and Cable are also dealt with more frankly in the film than in the original 1949 musical.

=== Music ===
Sixteen songs from the musical are featured in the film, although "Happy Talk" was omitted and "Bali Ha'i" was cut in half. Vincent Paterson choreographed the musical numbers.

South Pacific: Original TV Soundtrack

Soundtrack album by Richard Rodgers
- Released: March 20, 2001
- Recorded: Studios 301 (Sydney, Australia)
- Genre: Film/Soundtrack
- Label: Columbia Records/Sony Music
- Producers: Michael Gore, Paul Bogaev

A soundtrack was released on March 20, 2001.

1. "Overture"
2. "There Is Nothing Like a Dame"
3. "A Cock-Eyed Optimist" - Close
4. "Bloody Mary"
5. "Bali Ha'i"
6. "Twin Soliloquies" - Close
7. "Some Enchanted Evening" - Šerbedžija
8. "Dites-moi"
9. "Younger Than Springtime" - Connick Jr.
10. "I'm Gonna Wash That Man Right Outa My Hair" - Close and Graff
11. Some Enchanted Evening (Reprise) - Close
12. "I'm in Love with a Wonderful Guy" - Close and Graff
13. "You've Got to Be Carefully Taught" – Connick Jr.
14. "This Nearly Was Mine"
15. "Honey Bun" - Close and Graff
16. "Finale Ultimo" - Close
17. "My Girl Back Home" - Close and Connick Jr.

== Release ==
=== Home media ===
The film was released on DVD on August 28, 2001. Special features include deleted scenes and a behind-the-scenes featurette.

In 2013, it was reissued on DVD by Mill Creek Entertainment in a double-feature set alongside the 1993 TV remake of Gypsy.

== Reception ==
=== Ratings ===
The movie was the most-watched program the night of its premiere, receiving 15.8 million viewers.

=== Critical response ===
Julie Salamon of The New York Times praised the film and, particularly, Close's performance, writing, "Ms. Close, lean and more mature, hints that a touch of desperation lies in Nellie's cockeyed optimism. 'I'm stuck like a dope with a thing like hope' means one thing when you are in your 20's, something else when you are not." She also noted that the movie "is beautifully produced, better than the stagy 1958 film. ... The other cast members, including Ms. Close, also sing well." The New York Post wrote that "Notions of racism toward the islanders were glossed over in the 1958 movie, but in tonight's remake, the racial themes are brought to the surface, to the production's advantage ... there's a heightened sense of drama and tension in the remake because the war is closer at hand ... the rewards are great."

The Washington Post noted:

[M]ost of the songs have been preserved, although, ironically, "Happy Talk" is gone, reportedly because it was deemed offensive – portraying natives of the region as simpleminded sillybillies .... Also removed, whether easily or not, is "My Girl Back Home" .... And yet there are musical highlights that all but leap from the screen, probably the highest being Close's infectious "Wonderful Guy". Cuts made in "I'm Gonna Wash That Man Right Outa My Hair" for the '58 movie have been restored, and the arrangement includes a bit of Andrews Sistersly harmonizing that works well.... Close is, of course, a better actor on her worst days than Gaynor was on her best, and though she's older than is usual for someone playing nurse Nellie Forbush, she brings radiance, warmth and stature to the part. She also tears merrily into Nellie's numbers.

There was criticism by some, for example, theatre critic and historian John Kenrick because the order of the songs was changed, and because Rade Sherbedgia, unlike previous Emiles, did not have an operatic singing voice. Playbill reported that "Internet chat room visitors have grumbled that Close is too old for the role of Nellie Forbush, who, in the song, 'A Cock-Eyed Optimist', is described as 'immature and incurably green'", but also that "[co-producer] Cohen said the 'May–December' romance plot point ... has less resonance with audiences today and it was cut. Nellie is ageless, in effect."

In the 2008 Oxford Companion to the American Musical, Thomas Hischak wrote:

South Pacific (ABC-TV 2001) was an odd mixture of faithful Rodgers and Hammerstein and some headstrong changes that give one pause. Glenn Close's Nellie was neither young nor a hick, exuding more sophistication than an Empress. Rade Serbedzija was a short, scruffy, beach bum of an Emile who sang with a tenor voice. Whether this was foolhardy casting or a refreshing interpretation is a matter of opinion.

=== Awards and nominations ===
Award	Year	Category	Nominee	Result	Ref.
Primetime Emmy Awards	2001	Outstanding Music Direction	Paul Bogaev	Nominated	
Primetime Emmy Awards	2001	Outstanding Sound Mixing for a Limited or Anthology Series or Movie	Guntis Sics, Rick Ash, Joe Earle, Joel Moss	Nominated	

== See also ==
- List of television films produced for American Broadcasting Company
