= Caravans (novel) =

Novel by James A. Michener

- First edition cover
- Author: James A. Michener
- Cover artist: Barry Martin
- Language: English
- Publisher: Random House
- Publication date: August 9, 1963
- Publication place: United States
- Media type: print
- Pages: 341
- ISBN: 0-394-41849-2

Caravans, a novel by James A. Michener, was published in 1963.

The story is set in Afghanistan immediately following World War II. The protagonist, Mark Miller, is stationed in Kabul at the American embassy and has been assigned to investigate the disappearance of Ellen Jasper, also from the United States, who had married an Afghan national thirteen months earlier.

During his journey through Afghanistan, Miller comes to a deeper understanding of the complexities and nuances of contemporary Afghan life. His travels also reveal the similarities of human nature across cultural and social boundaries.

The novel was the basis of a 1978 film with the same title starring Anthony Quinn and Jennifer O'Neill.
