= The Eagle and the Raven =

1990 novel by James Michener

The Eagle And The Raven
- First edition
- Author: James Michener
- Language: English
- Genre: Historical novel
- Publisher: State House Press
- Publication date: Sep 1990
- Publication place: United States
- Media type: Print (Hardback)
- Pages: 214
- ISBN: 0-938349-57-0

The Eagle and the Raven is a 1990 book written by author James Michener, published by State House Press of Austin, Texas.

The Eagle and the Raven was originally the fourth chapter of Michener's novel Texas, but was deleted. It was then published separately at the insistence of Debbie Brothers, Michener's former secretary. It is a character study of the two dominant figures from the opposing sides of the separation of Texas from Mexico, Sam Houston (the raven) and Antonio López de Santa Anna (the eagle).

The book begins with a 32-page autobiographical prologue, which gives details and reasons for Michener's explosion of productivity in the last decade of his life.
