= Alaska (novel) =

Novel by James A. Michener

- 1st edition cover
- Author: James A. Michener
- Language: English
- Genre: Historical
- Publisher: Random House
- Publication date: 1988
- Publication place: United States
- Media type: Print (Hardcover)
- Pages: 868 pp
- ISBN: 0-394-55154-0
- OCLC: 17441704
- Dewey Decimal: 813/.54 19
- LC Class: PS3525.I19 A79 1988

Alaska is a 1988 historical novel by James A. Michener. Like other Michener titles, Alaska spans a considerable amount of time, traced through the gradual interlinking of several families.

== Plot introduction ==
Alaska is 868 pages long. Along with the reading, Michener provides a table of contents, a list of acknowledgements, and a Fact and Fiction section. The third item offers the reader an insight into what occurred in real life and what the author invented.

== Plot summary ==
=== Chapter I: The Clashing Terranes ===
A sweeping description of the formation of the North American continent. The reader follows the development of the Alaskan terrain over millennia. The city of Los Angeles is now some twenty-four hundred miles south of central Alaska, and since it is moving slowly northward as the San Andreas Fault slides irresistibly along, the city is destined eventually to become part of Alaska. If the movement is two inches a year, which it often is, Los Angeles can be expected to arrive off Anchorage in about seventy-six million years.

=== Chapter II: The Ice Castle ===
The plot of this chapter follows the mastodons, sabre-toothed tigers and woolly mammoths as they make their way into Alaska via the land bridge. First, the animals are discussed in general terms. Then, in the second half of the chapter, the reader learns about a specific mammoth named Mastodon, and another named Matriarch. The plot follows Matriarch and her family, as they encounter man for the first time.

=== Chapter III: People of the North ===
About some of the early Eskimos, particularly a man named Oogruk and his family. The chapter details the hunting of a whale as well as the beginning of hunting sea otters for fur by the Russians.

=== Chapter IV: The Explorers ===
This chapter tells of the early exploration of Alaska along with Russia's first encounters with the native peoples, including the brutal slaughter of many native people and sea otters.

=== Chapter V: The Duel ===
The duel referred to in the chapter's title is the one between the shamanism of the native people and the Christianity of the Russian settlers. After the men from one tribe are taken away to aid in hunting, the women and babies are left to fend for themselves. They learn to pilot kayaks, something that had been forbidden to them, and ultimately harpoon a small whale to ensure their survival. After the Russians return, a girl named Cidaq is "purchased" and taken to Kodiak Island, but not before she is brutally abused by one sailor in particular. On Kodiak, she consults with a shaman and his mummy and decides to seek revenge upon this man by converting to Christianity to marry him when he returns to Kodiak, believing that she can humiliate him by refusing to marry him at the last moment. However, she goes through with the wedding and becomes a battered wife. A priest on Kodiak falls in love with her, and after her husband is killed by a great tidal wave, Cidaq (rechristened Sofia) marries the priest, who changes his relationship with the church to become the kind of priest who can marry. At the end of the chapter, Michener states that Christianity won over shamanism, but in the process, the population of native people dwindled from more than 18,000 to fewer than 1,200.

=== Chapter VI: Lost Worlds ===
This chapter further details the clashes between the Native people and the Russians, most specifically the Battle of Sitka. The events are shown through the eyes of a native named Raven-heart and an Arkady Voronov, the son of Father Vornov and Sofia Kuchovskaya (formerly Cidaq). Arkady Voronov marries a Russian woman who moves to Alaska, and together they navigate the Yukon River. The chapter also explains the death of Alexander Baranov and ends with the purchase of Alaska by the United States of America.

=== Chapter VII: Giants in Chaos ===
This chapter shows the clash between two rival ship captains, Captains Schransky and Michael A. Healy. Meanwhile, Reverend Sheldon Jackson, a missionary, travels to Alaska to further establish it as a state, with the help of Senator Benjamin Harrison. He sets about establishing Christian missions of various denominations to further spread Christianity to the native people of Alaska.

=== Chapter VIII: Gold ===
The eighth chapter tells of the chaos surrounding the Alaskan gold rush using the fictitious Venn family and a prospector named John Klope. It mentions the real character of Soapy Smith and his fatal duel with Frank H. Reid. It also details the hardships of crossing the Chilkoot Pass.

=== Chapter IX: The Golden Beaches of Nome ===
Gold is discovered in Nome, and Tom Venn and his stepmother Missy pick up their stakes and move there. Tom is appointed manager of a branch of Ross and Raglan, a store that sells food and outdoor supplies. Missy's boyfriend Matt Murphy joins Tom and Missy in Nome, arriving there via bicycle. Although these characters are fictitious, the bike trip is based on the real bike trek of Max R. Hirshberg in 1900, and the troubles of gold mine thieving with judicial collusion is based upon the politician Alexander McKenzie and Judge Arthur H. Noyes.

=== Chapter X: Salmon ===
This chapter describes the formation and operation of a fictional company's cannery (an Alaskan first) on the Taku Inlet when Ross and Raglan appoint Tom Venn to be in charge of the cannery, the fishing and the Chinese laborers. Along the way, the company clashes with local members of the Tlingit tribe, whose fishing rights are being encroached upon. Tom begins on-and-off romances with two girls; one is Lydia Ross, the daughter of the owner of Ross and Raglan, and the other is Nancy Bigears, the daughter of a local Tlingit of whom Tom is very fond. Nancy Bigears, knows the romance cannot continue because Tom Venn is unable to comprehend the fishing rights and salmon conservancy issues created by his cannery. Nancy Bigears father, who lived across the inlet from the cannery is now prohibited from fishing on his ancestral lands. At the end of the chapter, the reader learns that Tom marries Lydia, and that Nancy marries Ah Ting, a Chinese man who was once employed as a foreman at the salmon cannery before striking out on his own.

=== Chapter XI: The Railbelt ===
In 1919, a government official arrives in a small town of Minnesota made up of immigrants of Swedish and Finnish descent, as well as those who have been in the United States for several generations. He recruits a group of families to move to Alaska and settle in the Matanuska Valley, where they will be provided with land that they will not begin to pay on for at least three years, as long as they promise to farm. This chapter follows the Flatch family closely, especially the children. LeRoy Flatch grows up to become a bush pilot and Flossie is an animal lover who falls in love with a local "half-breed" man of white and Eskimo descent.

=== Chapter XII: The Rim of Fire ===
In a typical James Michener fashion, the final chapter is an interaction between various characters in preceding chapter or their descendants. Alaska is in the process of applying for statehood. Missy remains on the side advocating for statehood, while Tom Venn petitioned to keep Alaska a territory and under Seattle business control. In the end President Dwight D. Eisenhower signs the Alaska Statehood Act, making Alaska the 49th state of the Union.

== Allusions/references to actual history, geography and current science ==
Michener invents characters and places although he also uses factual people or places in fictional events.

- Vitus Bering and the Bering Strait
- Alexander Baranov
- James Cook
- Kodiak Island
- The Tlingit people
- Battle of Sitka
- Dmitri Petrovich Maksutov
- The Yukon River
- The Reverend Sheldon Jackson
- The settlement in Matanuska Valley
- Captain Michael A. Healy

== Artwork ==
=== Drawings and maps ===
Throughout the novel are drawings (at the beginnings of chapters) and maps (frontispiece, pages 102–103, and inside back cover). There is also an amount of calligraphy. The maps are credited to Jean-Paul Tremblay. Carole Lowenstein is responsible for the book's physical and calligraphy.

=== Jacket design ===
The jacket of Alaska features an illustration on the front and a photograph of Michener on the back. The jacket design and aforementioned sketch are credited to Wendell Minor. The illustration is an oval-shaped sketch of items easily identifiable with the state of Alaska.They include (clockwise):

- a snow-capped mountain
- a sky of pink, orange, and yellow hues
- an amphibious airplane (known as a 'bush plane' in the state)
- a dark gray-green hill
- a floating, craggy iceberg
- calm, highly-reflective water
- a small figure in a kayak
- a tiny village at the foot of another hill

The photograph of James Michener, on the back cover, was taken in 1986 when Michener was working on Alaska. Michener's picture is credited to Michael A. Lewis of the Sheldon Jackson College in Sitka, Alaska.

== Journey ==
Michener's novel Journey (1989) was expanded from a section originally cut from Alaska.

== Critical reception ==
Kirkus Reviews was lukewarm about the novel, describing the characters as puppets and that the historical framework of the book lacked rigor and substance. The Harbus described the book as easily-digestible, compelling, and accessible. The Christian Science Monitor points out that people, rather than events, uniquely shape this historical novel.
