= Journey (novel) =

1989 novel by James Michener

- First edition cover
- Author: James Michener
- Language: English
- Genre: Historical novel
- Publisher: Random House
- Publication date: 1989
- Publication place: United States
- Media type: Print (Hardback)
- Pages: 224pp.
- ISBN: 0-394-57826-0

Journey is a novel by James Michener published in 1989. He developed it from a section originally cut from his large novel Alaska (1988). The book depicts five men, one of which is an English lord (Lord Luton). All the men journey from Great Britain through Canada to Dawson, Yukon in 1897-99 to participate in the Klondike gold rush.

According to the novel's afterword, Michener cut the section from his original book because Alaska already contained a chapter on the Alaskan side of the gold rush. He decided that chapter (which eventually was fully developed as Journey) could stand on its own as a short novel.

Directed by Lord Luton, the group purposely embarks on a more difficult than normal route available to pioneers of the era, purely to ensure that they remained the entire route on British soil and avoided American territory, which Luton has a patriotic aversion against. Along the way they encounter the Athabasca Landing, the Great Slave Lake, the Mackenzie River, Fort Norman (a remote Hudson's Bay Company outpost), exploding ice floes in springtime, starvation, scurvy, swarming Arctic mosquitoes, and members of the native Hän group.

== Journey Prize ==
In 1989, Michener donated the royalty earnings from the Canadian edition of Journey, published in Canada by McClelland & Stewart, to endow the Journey Prize, an annual Canadian literary award worth Cdn$10,000 that is awarded for the year's best short story published by an emerging Canadian writer.

== Research ==
Michener notes during his 'Reflections' chapter of the book that the writings of J.G. MacGregor in Klondike Rush Through Edmonton 1897-1898 proved invaluable in describing conditions of the time, including susceptibility to scurvy.
