= Literary Reflections =

1993 memoir by James A. Michener

- First edition
- Author: James Michener
- Language: English
- Genre: Memoir
- Publisher: State House Press
- Publication date: 1993
- Publication place: United States
- Media type: Print (Hardback)
- Pages: 213pp.
- ISBN: 1-880510-06-5

Literary Reflections (1993) was written by American author James A. Michener.

A compilation of previously published materials with updates and an Introduction written by Mr. Michener in 1993.

== Chapter Summary ==
=== 1. Collectors, Forgers — And A Writer: A Memoir ===
65 pages. Originally published by Targ Editions in 1983.
A discussion of Mr. Michener's college years and some acquaintances and works that still influenced him later in his life and career.

=== 2. Testimony ===
25 pages. Originally published by A. Grove Day of White Knight Press in 1983.
A discussion of his self-education on how to write a novel and the books which most influenced his style.

=== 3. Who Is Virgil T. Fry? ===
9 pages. Originally published in The Clearing House in October 1941, with a foreword written by Mr. Michener in 1993.
Michener's first published work of fiction.
Unlike his later work, much of the action is told through dialog.
The main character was also the basis for the main character in "Tales Of The South Pacific".

=== 4. Verses To A Writer Heading For Ninety ===
4 pages. Original to this book. 1993

=== 5. Opinions On Other Writers ===
==== Ernest Hemingway ====
Introduction to "The Dangerous Summer" Originally published by Scribers in 1985 and updated for this book by Mr. Michener in 1993.

==== Margaret Mitchell ====
Introduction to the 1975 Anniversary Edition of "Gone With The Wind". Originally published by Macmillan in 1975.

==== Marcus Goodrich ====
Afterward to a reprint of "Delilah" published by Southern Illinois University Press in 1977 and updated for this book by Mr. Michener in 1993.

==== Truman Capote ====
Foreword to "Conversations With Capote" written by Lawrence Grobel and Originally published by New American Library in 1985.
