= Mexico (novel) =

1992 novel by James A. Michener

- Cover of the first edition
- Author: James Michener
- Language: English
- Genre: Historical novel
- Publisher: Random House
- Publication date: 1992
- Publication place: United States
- Media type: Print (hardback)
- Pages: 625pp.
- ISBN: 0-679-41649-8

Mexico is a novel by James A. Michener published in 1992. Michener began work on the novel in 1961, abandoned it, and returned to it in 1991.

== Plot ==
The main action of Mexico takes place in Mexico over a three-day period in the fictional city of Toledo in 1961. The occasion is the annual bullfighting festival, at which two matadors — one an acclaimed hero of the sport, the other a scrapping contender — are prepared to fight to the death for fame and glory.

Through the memories of the book's narrator, Norman Clay, an American journalist of Spanish and Indian descent, Michener provides plenty of historical background, including a depiction of the fictitious Indian civilization that once flourished on the city's periphery. The story focuses on bullfighting, but also provides insight into Mexican culture. The reader follows the bulls from their breeding to their "sorting" to the pageantry and spectacle of the bullring, where picadors and banderilleros prepare the bull for the entrance of the matador with his red cape.

== Reception ==
Publishers Weekly gave a negative review, criticizing the characterizations and plotting, and wrote that Mexico "doesn't catch fire as a personal story." Despite this negative review, Mexico charted at number 8 of Publishers Weekly's list bestselling books in the USA for 1992.
