= The Bridge at Andau =

1957 book by James A. Michener

- First US edition cover
- Author: James A. Michener
- Language: English
- Publisher: Random House
- Publication date: 1957
- Publication place: United States
- Media type: print
- Pages: 270pp.
- ISBN: 0-394-41778-X

The Bridge at Andau is a 1957 nonfiction book by the American author James Michener chronicling the Hungarian Revolution of 1956. Living in Austria in the 1950s, Michener was at the border of Austria and Hungary during the period in which a significant wave of refugees fled Hungary.

The book is one of Michener's journalistic works (his 9th or 10th published book) and much shorter than the episodic novels that he wrote over the next thirty years. While the book is of an historical event based upon interviews with eyewitnesses, the story is told largely through composite characters or characters based on real people whose names were changed, either for their safety or the safety of family left behind. The story examines the experience of different segments of Hungarian society, both before and during the uprising, such as students, workers, soldiers, secret police, and ordinary citizens. The book takes the reader to the streets of Budapest, where unarmed young people, factory workers, and poorly equipped Hungarian soldiers fought Soviet tanks. It also tells the bittersweet story of the few days of freedom enjoyed by the citizens of Budapest before the Soviets returned in force.

Written soon after the events it chronicles, and published during the ongoing general strike that started soon after the Soviet reoccupation, the book serves to give the reader an idea of the middle years of the Cold War.

The title of the books refers to an actual bridge on the Austria-Hungary border near the village of Andau. The bridge was destroyed in November 1956 by Soviet troops. It was rebuilt in 1996 as a symbol of tolerance and helpfulness.

== Characters ==
=== Josef Toth ===
He is an 18-year-old boy who was blond, gray-eyed, and had a fair amount of acne. Josef escaped to Austria and helped many others escape as well. He became known for being a man who not only looked out for himself but for others as well.

=== AVO ===
The State Protection Authority (Hungarian: Államvédelmi Hatóság or ÁVH, referred to as "AVO" in the book) was the secret police of Hungary from 1945 until 1956. It was conceived as an external appendage of the Soviet Union's secret police forces and gained an indigenous reputation for brutality during a series of purges beginning in 1948, intensifying in 1949 and ending in 1953. In 1953 Joseph Stalin died, and Imre Nagy (a moderate reformer) was appointed Prime Minister of Hungary. Under Nagy's first government from 1953 to 1955, the ÁVH was gradually reined in.
