= Chesapeake (novel) =

1978 novel by James A. Michener

- First edition cover
- Author: James A. Michener
- Language: English
- Genre: Historical
- Publisher: Random House
- Publication date: June 12, 1978
- Publication place: United States
- Media type: Print (hardback & paperback)
- Pages: 865 pp; 1001 pp (paperback)
- ISBN: 0-394-50079-2
- OCLC: 3730647
- Dewey Decimal: 813/.5/4
- LC Class: PZ3.M583 Ch PS3525.I19

Chesapeake is a novel by James A. Michener, published by Random House in 1978. The story deals with several families living in the Chesapeake Bay area around Maryland from 1583 to 1978.

== Plot summary ==
The story-line, like much of Michener's work, depicts a number of characters within family groups over a long time period, richly illustrating the history of the area through these families' timelines. It starts in 1583 with American Indian tribes warring, moves with English settlers through the 17th century (land appropriation, tobacco farming, indentured servitude, religious persecution, etc.), slavery, pirate attacks, the American Revolution and the Civil War, Emancipation and attempted assimilation, to the final major event being the Watergate scandal of 1972-1974. The last voyage, a funeral, is in 1978.

== Chapters ==
The book is divided into 14 separate chapters with two sections each. The first part provides a key date and describes the background behind the arrival of a person or thing (i.e., a family of Canada geese in Voyage Eight and floodwaters in Voyage Eleven) to the Delmarva Peninsula area, while the second section provides a thematic name and describes how the new arrivals interact with places and the people already settled in the area.

- Voyage One: 1583
  - The River
- Voyage Two: 1608
  - The Island
- Voyage Three: 1636
  - The Marsh
- Voyage Four: 1661
  - The Cliff
- Voyage Five: 1701
  - Rosalind's Revenge
- Voyage Six: 1773
  - Three Patriots
- Voyage Seven: 1811
  - The Duel
- Voyage Eight: 1822
  - Widow's Walk
- Voyage Nine: 1832
  - The Slave-Breaker
- Voyage Ten: 1837
  - The Railroad
- Voyage Eleven: 1886
  - The Watermen
- Voyage Twelve: 1938
  - Ordeal by Fire
- Voyage Thirteen: 1976
  - Refuge
- Voyage Fourteen: 1978

== Geography ==
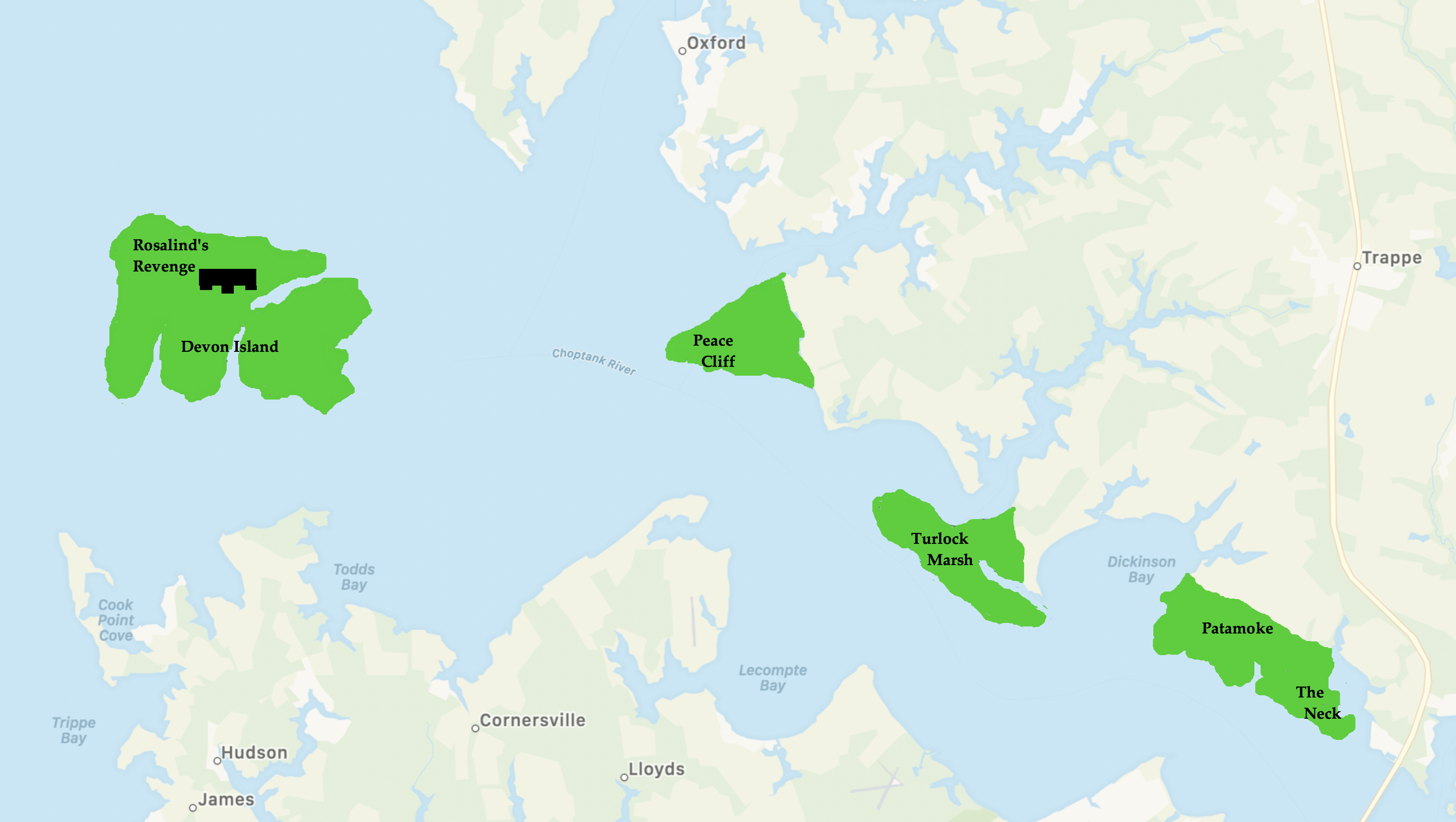

Most of the events of the novel take place on the Eastern Shore of Maryland, and, more specifically, on and around the Choptank River. Michener lived near there, in St. Michaels, while he worked on the book.

Michener developed four fictional pieces of land in Maryland to build the locations of his novel: Patamoke and The Neck; The Turlock Marsh; Peace Cliff; and Devon Island on which Rosalind's Revenge was built. All of these locations were placed by the open water of the Choptank. The location of Devon Island would be immediately north of Todds Point, approximately 3 miles southeast of the southern tip of Tilghman Island. The town of Patamoke lies on a fictitious promontory on the Choptank opposite Cambridge.

The Quaker Meeting House that Michener places in Patamoke in the novel is based upon the Third Haven Meeting House, built in Easton, Md. in the 1680s; it is the oldest Quaker meeting house in the United States (see List of the oldest churches in the United States).

== Themes and motifs ==
The novel has a number of central themes, such as religion, slavery, poverty, and industry, each personified by a particular family that settles on the Bay, and in some cases, by several families.

The religious element of the novel applies to the Steeds, who are Roman Catholic and the Paxmores who are Quakers (Michener himself was raised a Quaker by his adopted mother). At several points the novel takes the form of debate with religious themes or overtones, beginning with a doctrinal discussion about the religious role of women between Ralph Steed, a Catholic priest, and Ruth Brinton, a matriarch of the Paxmore family. Each such debate always involves one of the Paxmores, with the source of disagreement being rooted in that individual Quaker's beliefs.

Slavery is an overriding theme of the entire book. The Steeds are great landowners and one of the greatest holders of slaves in the colonies, whereas the Paxmores, through Ruth Brinton, are the first proponents of emancipation. It is said that the Choptank Quakers' Association (near the Choptank River) is the first religious organization to ban slavery. Later in the book, Cudjo Cater is captured in Africa and put to work on the Steed plantation, where he buys his freedom and settles in the nearby township with a wife. The Cater family is forever affected by slavery, even after emancipation, as evidenced when Jeb Cater tries to get his son treated for an ear infection. Prior to the American Civil War (1861–1865), the Paxmores form the Maryland link of the "Underground Railroad" to free territory in Pennsylvania, which Cudjo contemplates using before he buys his freedom.

Poverty is best shown in the living standards of the Turlocks, who live in a marsh on the riverside. While they are one of the families closest to nature throughout the whole novel, akin to most of the Indians, they live in the same one bedroom shack built in the 17th century, and the children often watch the adults' sexual activity. However, by the end of the book, at least some of the Turlocks have risen out of poverty. The head of the Turlock family by 1978 is a wealthy real estate broker, selling waterside properties to a well-heeled clientele; one of his customers is a returning member of the Steed family. The other side of poverty is the place in the township dubbed "The Neck" in the 20th century, where all the Negro housing is located, including a separate segregated school and baseball diamond. Living standards are greatly reduced in "The Neck", with the school teacher managing multiple years, and children counting themselves privileged to have either a book or a desk. "The Neck" is eventually burned down by black activists, one of them Jeb Cater's son.

Industry is seen in how each family builds their life up around them due to need, and eventually flourishes. It starts with Pentaquod, a Susquehannock Indian, who settles on a clifftop which is paradise to him. Edmund Steed settles on Devon Island and builds his home, complete with chapel, and founds his great plantation from the ground up with land bought from the Indians. The Steeds eventually own thousands of acres and are extremely wealthy. The Paxmores start with Edward Paxmore, a Quaker carpenter, being banished from Massachusetts and building his house on a cliff overlooking the Choptank. He learns how to build a boat because of necessity and with only help from Indians, and eventually learns how to build an ocean-going sailing ship. His boat-building business becomes highly successful and thrives in the township. The Caters struggle for a long time, until 'Big Jimbo' Cater becomes a cook for an oyster harvesting skipjack sailing vessel. He eventually earns enough money to buy his own skipjack, which he staffs with his family, and becomes a successful captain. The Caveneys, who emigrated from Ireland due to the Great Famine of the 1840s, are easily assimilated into the town, and become central characters in the oyster and duck subplots. As can be seen from each family's success through determination, the message is that they worked hard and attained great things.
