= The Source (novel) =

1965 historical novel by James A. Michener

- First edition
- Author: James A. Michener
- Illustrator: Jean-Paul Tremblay
- Cover artist: Guy Fleming
- Language: English
- Genre: Historical novel
- Publisher: Random House
- Publication date: 1965
- Publication place: United States
- Media type: Print (Hardback & Paperback)

The Source is a historical novel by James A. Michener published in 1965. It is a survey of the history of the Jewish people and the land of Israel from pre-monotheistic days through the birth of the modern State of Israel and up until 1964. In a description by Emily Alward, she says that by using the experiences of its characters, the story illustrates "the survival and resilience of the Jewish people in the face of adversity,... invasions and persecution."The Source uses, for its central device, a fictional tell (mound/hill) called "Makor" (Hebrew: מָקוֹר, "source"), in the Galilee region of Israel. Prosaically, the name comes from a freshwater well just north of Makor, but symbolically it stands for much more, historically and spiritually.

Unlike most Michener novels, this book is not in strict chronological order. A parallel frame story set in Israel in the 1960s supports the historical timeline. Archaeologists digging at the tell at Makor uncover artifacts from each layer, which then serve as the basis for a chapter exploring the lives of the people involved with that artifact. The book follows the story of the Family of Ur from a Stone Age family whose wife begins to believe that there is a supernatural force, which slowly leads us to the beginnings of monotheism. The descendants are not aware of the ancient antecedents revealed to the reader by the all-knowing writer as the story progresses through the Davidic kingdom, Hellenistic times, Roman times, etc. The site is continually inhabited until the end of the Crusades when it is destroyed by the victorious Mameluks (as happened to many actual cities after 1291) and is not rebuilt by the Ottomans.

== Development ==
At the time of publication in 1965, Michener was a writer in his prime as an acclaimed author. He had been wanting to write a book concerning the Middle East for nearly 10 years prior to beginning this book. It was while he was visiting the ruins of a crusader castle near Haifa that the story began to form in his mind.

In the summer of 1963 Michener parked himself in a room of the Haifa Dan Carmel Hotel and began work on The Source. He used the method of working on location so as to have easy access to the many experts he would use as sources.

== Chapter list ==
1. The Tell – 1963, three archeologists, a Jew, a Catholic, and a Muslim, are at a modern archeological dig. The story moves back and forth between the historical chapters and the modern dig at the tell at Makor.
2. The Bee-Eater (Level XV, 9831 BCE) – Introduction to the Ur family in Stone Age times and their first move into an agricultural society.
3. Of Death and Life (Level XIV, 2202 BCE) – Starting prior to 2000 BCE, the concept of an ultimate supreme being takes root with the introduction of the Cult of El, as are some barbaric and mystic practices, like child sacrifice and temple prostitution.
4. An Old Man and His God – Bronze Age, an early view of Hebrews as they moved from the desert life into Canaan and brought along the early teachings of El Shaddai. Makor is sacked by the Hebrews in 1491 BCE.
5. Psalm of the Hoopoe Bird – Takes place 1040–970 BCE, during the last years of King David.
6. The Voice of Gomer – 605–562 BCE. Following the Egyptian defeat at the Battle of Carchemish, Nebuchadnezzar II marches into the Levant and deports the Jews to Babylon.
7. In the Gymnasium – 222–187 BCE, Jewish life under the Seleucid Empire.
8. King of the Jews – 74 BCE – 4 CE: this chapter is told in epistolary form and describes the rise of the ambitious Herod the Great and his eventual descent into madness.
9. Yigal and His Three Generals – 12–70 CE: this chapter begins with the rule of the mad Caligula and his attempt to force idolatry on the Jews. After his death, he was replaced by the madder Nero, who ordered Vespasian to repress Josephus and the First Jewish–Roman War.
10. The Law – This chapter takes place after the Empress Helena's pilgrimage to the Holy Land. Christianity is being forced in Galilee as churches are mass-produced. This chapter is about two Jews who convert to Christianity due to the strictness of the Talmud (during this time the Gemara is being written), but are soon disenfranchised by the Christian Schism. This chapter is also the fictional origin of St. Mark.
11. A Day in the Life of a Desert Rider – This chapter begins with the introduction of Islam to the Holy Land by Muslim conquests.
12. Volkmar – This chapter opens with Peter the Hermit as he travels the European countryside in search of participants for the ill-fated People's Crusade. It concludes with the First Crusade and the Siege of Jerusalem.
13. The Fires of Ma Coeur – In 1291, the last crusader strongholds begin to fall to the Mamaluks. The final stronghold is Acre.
14. The Saintly Men of Safed – This chapter focuses on the three rabbis who meet in Safed while escaping the Spanish Inquisition and European pogroms, and their culture clashes between Sephardim, Ashkenazim and Kabbalistic traditions.
15. Twilight of an Empire – In the 1880s the Ottoman Empire is falling apart and this chapter delves into the deep corruption in the public administration and Sultan Abdul Hamid II's backlash at reform.
16. Rebbe Itzik and the Sabra – 1948 – The new state of Israel starts to emerge. This chapter deals with the origins of two characters in the present day narrative – Ilan Eliav and Vered Bar El.
17. The Tell – The culmination of the novel and rediscovery of the well built and described in Chapter 5, Psalm of the Hoopoe Bird.

== Recurring symbols and themes ==
=== Fertility/The phallus ===
In the early civilizations, the concept of fertility sprouts from agriculture and the desire for a fruitful harvest. During the earliest layer of history, the giant stone idol named El is created to please the earth and bring good crops.

As society moves away from a rural and agricultural existence, fertility is given less and less importance. The phallus is present from the Stone Age ("The Bee Eater"), until 606 BCE ("The Voice of Gomer").

=== Prayer ===
Later, as modern Judaism begins to take form, the theme of dedication and tenacity is brought forward again and again. The final words of many of the book's characters are of prayer; they are defending their religion with their life. As anti-Semitism becomes more prevalent, this theme grows stronger, as if to show the strength of the faith that the Jewish people hold.
