= James A. Michener =

American author (1907–1997)

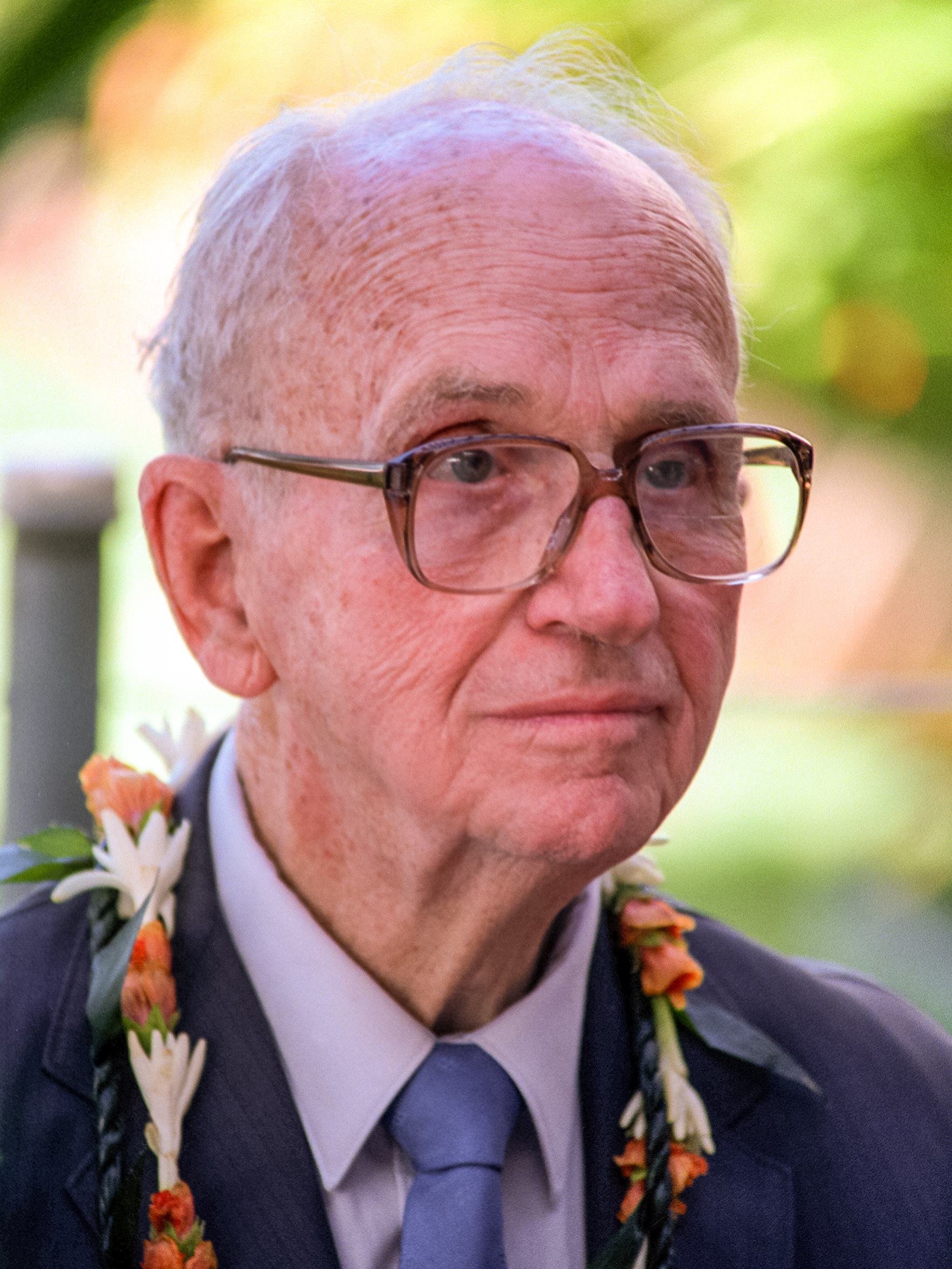
- Michener in 1991
- Born: James Albert Michener; February 3, 1907; Doylestown, Pennsylvania, U.S.
- Died: October 16, 1997 (aged 90); Austin, Texas, U.S.
- Education: Swarthmore College (BA); University of St Andrews; University of Northern Colorado (MA)
- Occupations: Author; philanthropist; teacher; academic; naval officer; political advisor
- Spouses: Patti Koon (m. 1935; div. 1948) Vange Nord (m. 1948; div. 1955) Mari Yoriko Sabusawa (m. 1955; died 1994)
- Writing career
- Genre: Historical fiction
- Notable work: Tales of the South Pacific (1946)
- Notable awards: Pulitzer Prize for Fiction (1948); Presidential Medal of Freedom (1977)

James Albert Michener (/ˈmɪtʃənər/ or /ˈmɪtʃnər/; February 3, 1907 – October 16, 1997) was an American writer. He wrote more than 40 books, most of which were long, fictional family sagas covering the lives of many generations, set in particular geographic locales and incorporating detailed history. Many of his works were bestsellers and were chosen by the Book of the Month Club. He was also known for the meticulous research that went into his books.

Michener's books include his first book, Tales of the South Pacific, for which he won the Pulitzer Prize for Fiction in 1948; Hawaii; The Drifters; Centennial; The Source; The Fires of Spring; Chesapeake; Caribbean; Caravans; Alaska; Texas; Space; Poland; and The Bridges at Toko-ri. His non-fiction works include Iberia, about his travels in Spain and Portugal; his memoir, The World Is My Home; and Sports in America. Return to Paradise combines fictional short stories with Michener's factual descriptions of the Pacific areas where they take place.

Tales of the South Pacific was adapted as the popular Broadway musical South Pacific, by Rodgers and Hammerstein. The musical in turn was adapted as a feature film in 1958 and 2001, adding to his financial success. A number of his other stories and novels were adapted for films and TV series.

He also wrote Presidential Lottery: The Reckless Gamble in Our Electoral System, in which he condemned the United States' Electoral College system. It was published in 1969, and republished in 2014 and 2016.

== Early life and education ==
Michener was born in Doylestown, Pennsylvania, on February 3, 1907. He later wrote that he did not know who his biological parents were, or exactly when or where he was born. He was raised a Quaker by an adoptive mother, Mabel Michener, in Doylestown.

Michener graduated from Doylestown High School in 1925. He attended Swarthmore College in Swarthmore, Pennsylvania, where he played college basketball and was a member of the Phi Delta Theta fraternity. After graduating summa cum laude in 1929 with a Bachelor of Arts degree in English and history, he traveled and studied in Scotland at the University of St Andrews in the medieval town of St. Andrews, Fife, on the coast of the North Sea for two years.

Michener talks about hoboing, the practice of riding freight trains for free, during the Great Depression, as mentioned in the 1998 Great Depression documentary on the History Channel.

Michener took a job as a high school English teacher at The Hill School in Pottstown, Pennsylvania. From 1933 to 1936, he taught English at George School in Newtown, Pennsylvania. He attended Colorado State Teachers College, later renamed the University of Northern Colorado, in Greeley, Colorado, where he earned a Master of Arts degree in education.

== Career ==
After graduation, Michener taught at the university and at College High School. The Michener Library at the University of Northern Colorado was named after him in October 1972.

In 1939, Michener accepted a position as a guest lecturer at Harvard University, where he worked for a year. He left to join Macmillan Publishers as their social studies education editor.

As a Quaker, he could have qualified as a conscientious objector and not been drafted into the military, but Michener enlisted in the United States Navy during World War II. He traveled throughout the South Pacific Ocean on various assignments which he gained because his base commanders mistakenly thought his father was Admiral Marc Mitscher. His experiences during these travels inspired the stories published in his breakout work Tales of the South Pacific.

=== Writing career ===
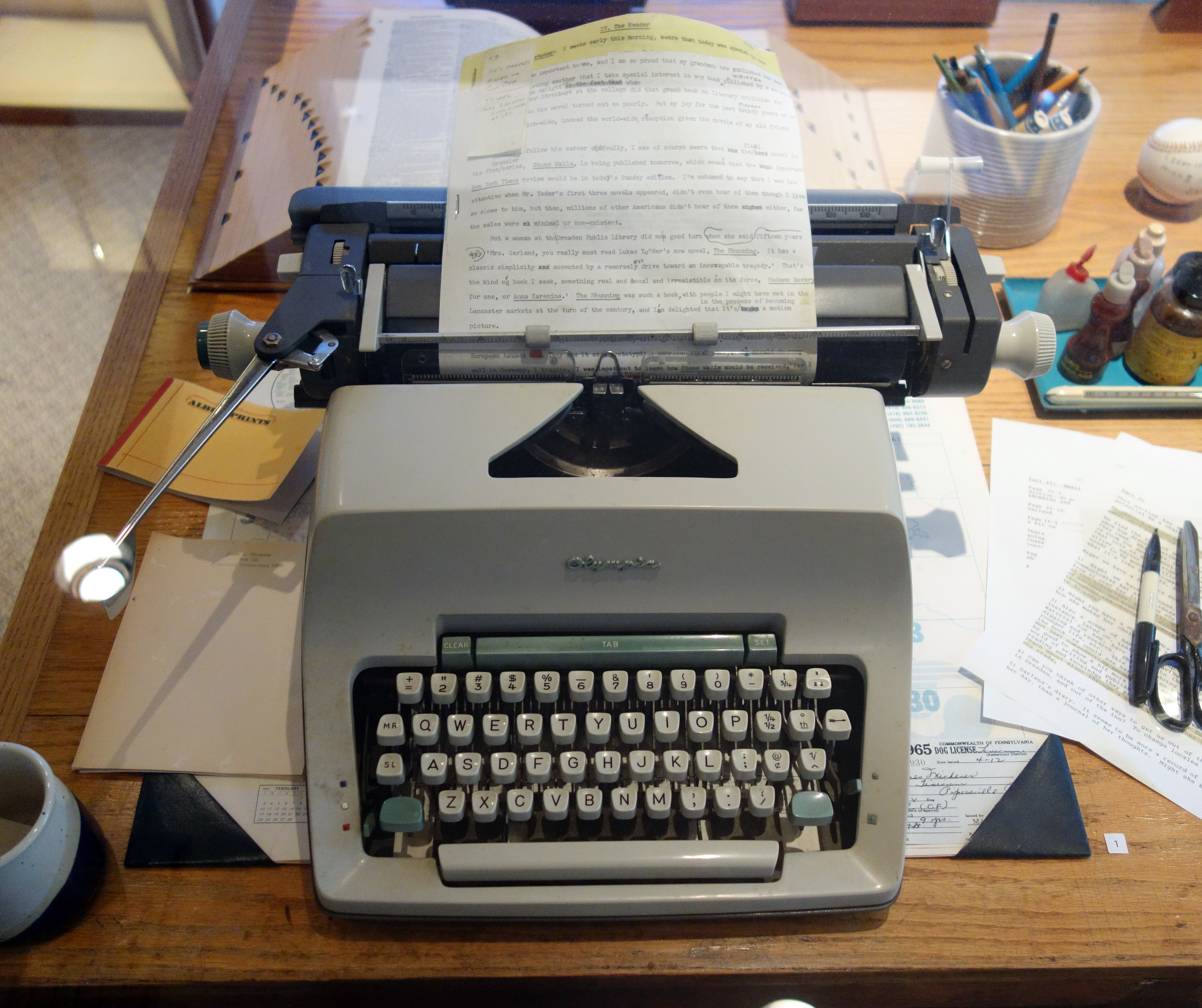
Michener's typewriter (James A. Michener Art Museum, Doylestown, Pennsylvania)

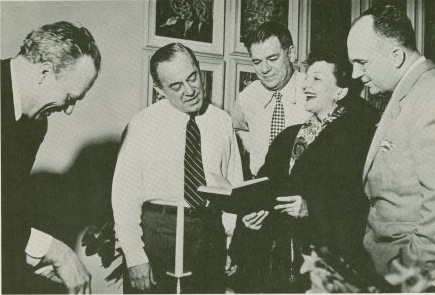
The creative team and star of South Pacific. Left to right: Joshua Logan, Richard Rodgers, Oscar Hammerstein II, Mary Martin, and Michener in 1949

Michener began his writing career during World War II, when as a lieutenant in the U.S. Navy he was assigned to the South Pacific as a naval historian. He later turned his notes and impressions into Tales of the South Pacific (1947), his first book, published when he was age 40. It won the Pulitzer Prize for fiction in 1948, and Rodgers and Hammerstein adapted it as the hit Broadway musical South Pacific, which premiered on Broadway in New York City in 1949. The musical was also adapted as eponymous feature films in 1958 and 2001.

Michener tried television writing but was unsuccessful. American television producer Bob Mann wanted Michener to co-create a weekly anthology series from Tales of the South Pacific and serve as narrator. Rodgers and Hammerstein, however, had bought all dramatic rights to the novel and did not relinquish their ownership. Michener did lend his name to a different television series, Adventures in Paradise, in 1959, starring Gardner McKay as Captain Adam Troy in the sailing ship Tiki III.

Michener was a popular writer during his lifetime; his novels sold an estimated 75 million copies worldwide. His novel Hawaii (1959), well-timed on its publication when Hawaii became the 50th state, was based on extensive research. He used this approach for nearly all of his subsequent novels, which were based on detailed historical, cultural, and even geological research. Centennial (1974), which documented several generations of families in the Rocky Mountains of the American West, was adapted as a popular 12-part television miniseries of the same name and aired on the National Broadcasting Company (NBC television network) from October 1978 through February 1979.

In the mid-1970s, Michener was a contributor to the Readers' Guide to Periodical Literature.

In 1996, State House Press published James A. Michener: A Bibliography, compiled by David A. Groseclose. Its more than 2,500 entries from 1923 to 1995 include magazine articles, forewords, and other works.

Several of his novels run more than 1,000 pages. The author states in My Lost Mexico (1992) that at times he would spend 12 to 15 hours per day at his typewriter for weeks on end, and that he used so much paper, his filing system had trouble keeping up.

== Personal life ==
Michener was married three times. In 1935, he married Patti Koon. In 1948, they divorced, and the same year Michener married his second wife, Vange Nord. Michener met his third wife, Mari Yoriko Sabusawa, at a luncheon in Chicago. An American, she and her Japanese parents were interned in western camps that the U.S. government set up during the early years of World War II to hold ethnic Japanese from West Coast / Pacific communities. Michener divorced Nord in 1955 and married Sabusawa the same year. Sabusawa died in 1994.

Michener's novel Sayonara (1954) is quasi-autobiographical. Set during the early 1950s, it tells the story of Major Lloyd Gruver, a United States Air Force ace jet pilot in the Korean War (1950–1953), now stationed in Japan, who falls in love with Hana-ogi, a Japanese woman. The novel follows their cross-cultural romance and illuminates the racism of the post-World War II time period. In 1957 it was adapted into the highly successful movie Sayonara which starred Marlon Brando, James Garner, Miiko Taka, Miyoshi Umeki and Red Buttons; Umeki and Buttons both won the 1958 Academy Award ("Oscar") for best supporting actor / actress for their performances.

=== Political career ===
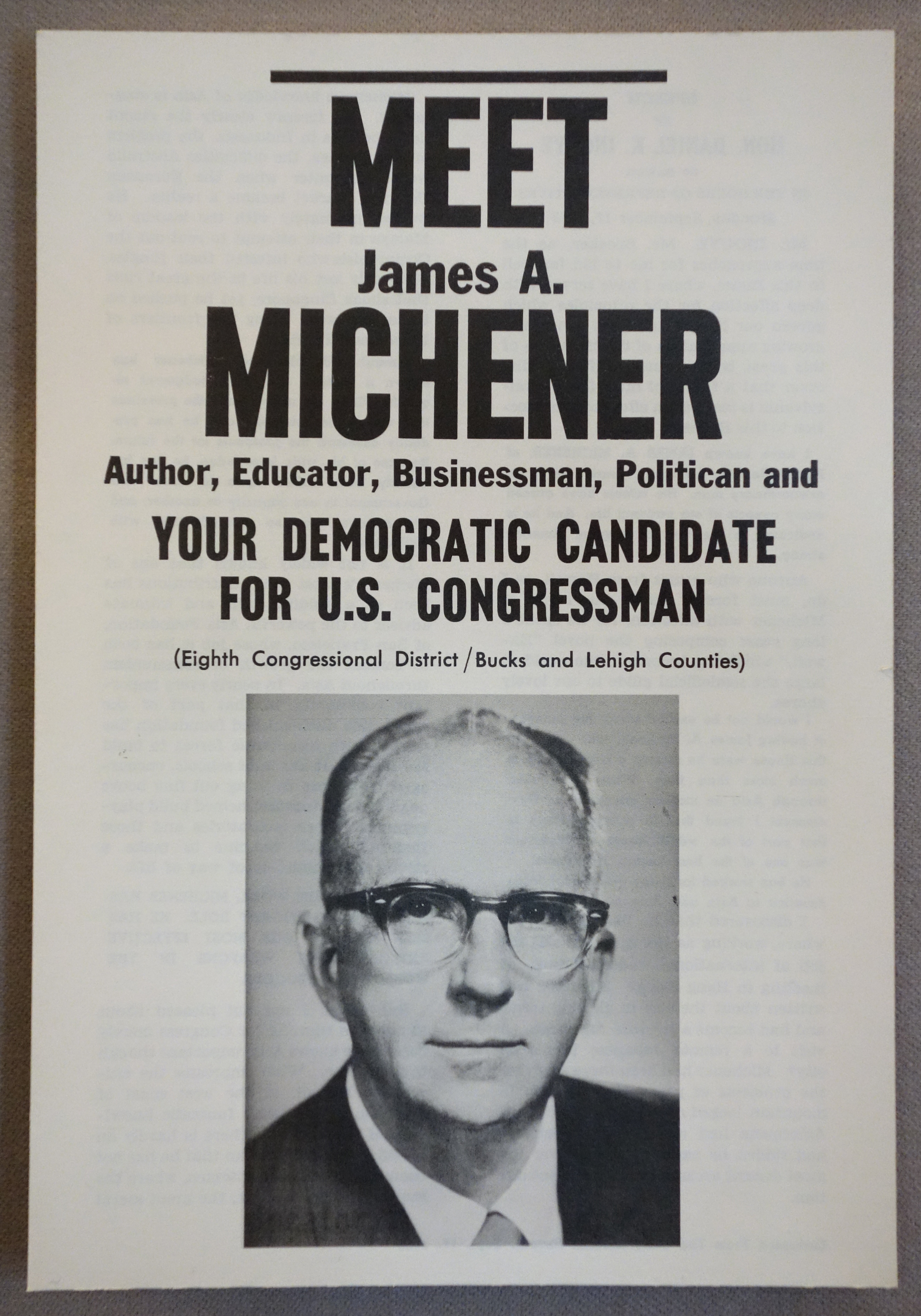
Campaign poster from Michener's 1962 campaign for Congress

In the 1960 presidential election, Michener was chairman of the Bucks County, Pennsylvania committee to elect Democrat John F. Kennedy as the 35th President. In 1962, he unsuccessfully ran as a Democratic Party candidate for a seat in the U.S. House of Representatives from Pennsylvania, a decision he later considered a misstep. He lost to the incumbent Republican congressman, Willard S. Curtin, in Pennsylvania's 6th Congressional District by a 55% to 45% margin. "My mistake was to run in 1962 as a Democratic candidate for Congress. [My wife] kept saying, 'Don't do it, don't do it.' I lost and went back to writing books." In his memoir The World Is My Home, Michener would describe running for office as "one of the best things I've done because campaigning in public knocks sense into a man."

In 1968, Michener served as campaign manager for the U.S. Senator Joseph S. Clark of Pennsylvania, who was running for reelection to a third term. Clark ultimately lost the race to Richard Schweiker, a moderate Republican. Michener later served as Secretary for the 1967–1968 Pennsylvania Constitutional Convention. Also that year, Michener was a member of the Electoral College, serving as a Pennsylvania Democrat. He wrote about that experience in a political science text Presidential Lottery: The Reckless Gamble in Our Electoral System, which was published the following year. In it, he suggested alternate systems, including using a direct popular vote by majority for the office of President of the United States and other more creative solutions.

=== Philanthropy ===
Michener became a major philanthropist, donating more than $100 million to educational, cultural, and writing institutions, including his alma mater, Swarthmore College, the Iowa Writers Workshop, and the James A. Michener Art Museum, and more than $37 million to University of Texas at Austin. By 1992, his gifts made him UT Austin's largest single donor to that time. Over the years, Mari Michener played a major role in helping direct his donations.

In 1989, Michener donated the royalty earnings from the Canadian edition of his novel Journey (1989), published in Canada by McClelland & Stewart, to create the Journey Prize, an annual Canadian literary prize worth $10,000 (CDN) that is awarded for the year's best short story published by an emerging Canadian writer.

In the Micheners' final years, he and his wife lived in Austin, Texas, and they endowed the Michener Center for Writers at the University of Texas at Austin. The Center provides three-year Michener Fellowships in fiction, poetry, playwriting and screenwriting to a small number of students.

== Death ==
In October 1997, suffering from terminal kidney disease, Michener opted to end his daily dialysis treatment that had kept him alive for four years. He said he had accomplished what he wanted and did not want further physical complications. On October 16, 1997, he died of kidney failure, at age 90. Michener was cremated, and his ashes were placed next to those of his wife at Austin Memorial Park Cemetery in Austin, Texas. Michener is honored by a memorial headstone at the Texas State Cemetery in Austin.

=== Bequests ===
Michener left most of his estate and book copyrights to Swarthmore College, where he earned his bachelor's degree. He had donated his papers to the University of Northern Colorado, where he earned his master's degree.

== Honors ==
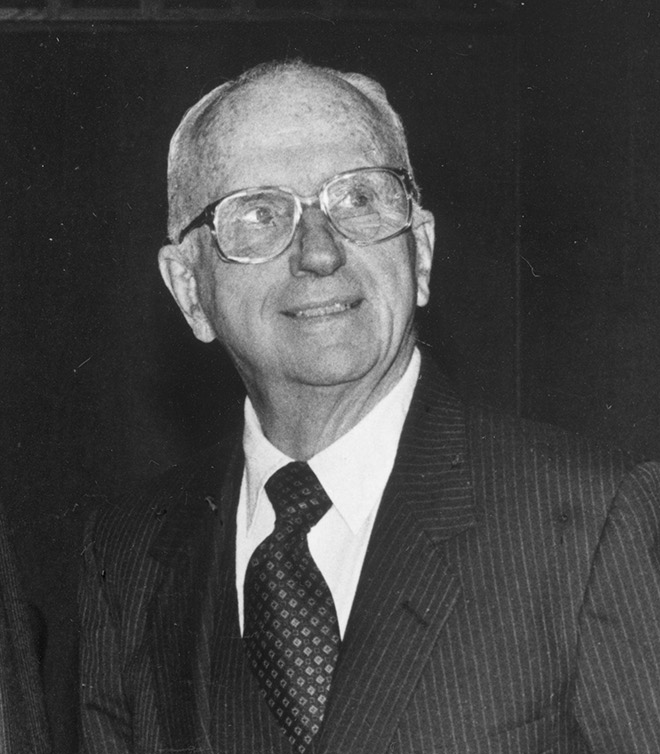
Michener in 1985

- In 1971, Michener was awarded the Golden Plate Award of the American Academy of Achievement
- In 1980, Michener threw out the first pitch of Game Two of the National League Championship between the Philadelphia Phillies and the Houston Astros.
- In 1981, Michener was awarded the St. Louis Literary Award from the Saint Louis University Library Associates in St. Louis, Missouri.
- In 1993, the U.S. Navy Memorial Foundation awarded Michener its "Lone Sailor Award" for his naval war service and his literary achievements.
- In 1994, Michener endorsed the naming as "Michener's" the restaurant at Iririki Island Resort, Port Vila, Vanuatu. He wrote:

Many of the fondest memories of my travels stem back to my years of military service in the New Hebrides – (now Vanuatu) – during the Pacific War years of the early 1940s...While those beautiful islands have changed much with progress in the ensuing years, I know from subsequent visits that the friendliness of the peoples, their infectious smiles and their open-heartedness will remain forever one of life's treasures.

=== Posthumous ===
- On May 12, 2008, the United States Postal Service honored him with a 59¢ Distinguished Americans series postage stamp.
- The Library at The University of Northern Colorado in Greeley, Colorado, his alma mater, is named "The James Michener Library" in his honor. On the mezzanine, there is a small display of his effects, including one of his typewriters.
- In 1998, the Raffles Hotel in Singapore named one of their suites after the author, in memory of his patronage and affection for the hotel. Michener first stayed at the Singapore hotel in 1949 after World War II. In a 1987 interview, he said it was a luxury for him, a young man, to stay at the Raffles Hotel then, and that he had the time of his life. He returned on a later trip. The suite was officially christened by Steven J. Green, Ambassador of United States to Singapore.

=== James A. Michener Art Museum ===
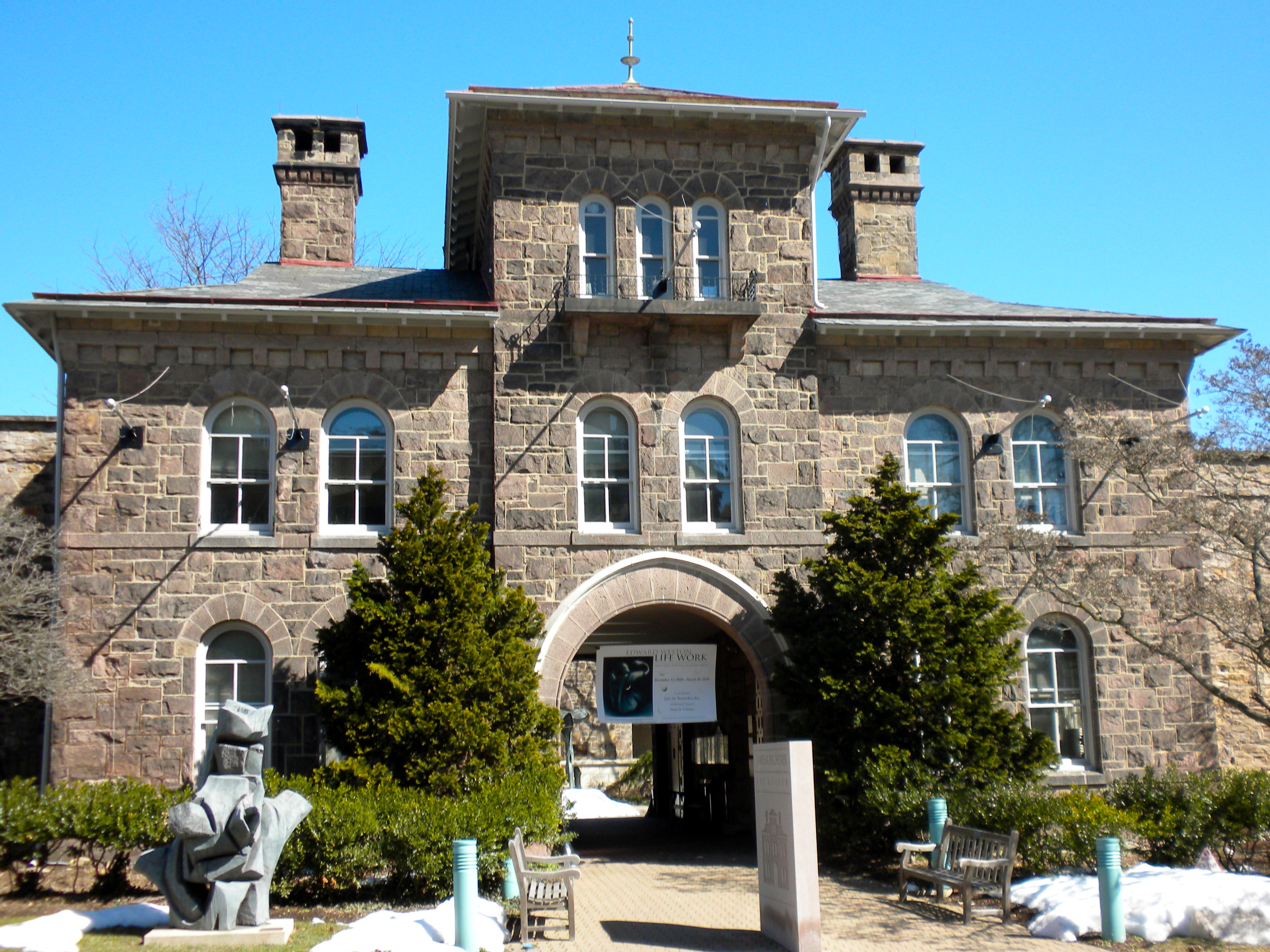
James Michener Museum in Doylestown, Pennsylvania

Opened in 1988, in Michener's hometown of Doylestown, Pennsylvania, the James A. Michener Art Museum houses collections of local and well-known artists. Michener pledged $5.5 million to the museum in 1996. Constructed from the remains of the old Bucks County Prison (replaced in 1985 with a larger, modern prison), the museum is a non-profit organization with both permanent and rotating collections. Two prominent permanent fixtures are the James A. Michener display room and the Nakashima Reading Room, constructed in honor of his third wife's Japanese heritage. The museum is known for its permanent collection of Pennsylvania Impressionist paintings.

=== James A. Michener Society ===
The James A. Michener Society was formed in the fall of 1998. It comprises people who share a common interest and admirers of Michener's life and work. The society sponsors a variety of activities and publishes an electronic internet newsletter. Annual meetings of members are held at locations closely associated with Michener's life. The society's purpose is to:

- Preserve the intellectual legacy of James A. Michener as a writer, teacher, historian, public servant, patriot, and philanthropist
- Ensure that future generations have full access to all his writings
- Promote the exchange of ideas and information about his writings
- Encourage fellowship among readers of his writings
- Inform devotees and members of the Society about recent publications and critiques of his writings

== Works ==
In addition to writing novels, short stories, and non-fiction, Michener was very involved with movies, TV series, and radio. The following is only a selection of the listings in the Library of Congress files.

=== Books—fiction ===
Title	Year Published	Description
Tales of the South Pacific	1947	Pulitzer Prize–winning collection of sequentially related short stories about World War II.
The Fires of Spring	1949	This coming of age tale follows orphan David Harper as he navigates life and love in America.
Return to Paradise	1950	Eight essays, each describing a South Pacific Island, and followed by a short story about that island.
The Bridges at Toko-ri	1953	This short novel chronicles the lives of young American servicemen fighting in the Korean War.
Sayonara	1954	Set during the early 1950s, it tells the story of Major Gruver, a soldier stationed in Japan, who falls in love with Hana-Ogi, a Japanese woman. The novel follows their cross-cultural Japanese romance and illuminates the racism of the post-World War II time period.
Hawaii	1959	This historical novel spans centuries of Hawaiian history, exploring the myriad influences that have shaped the people and landscapes of the state.
Caravans	1963	Framed through the eyes of an American diplomat looking for an American woman married to an Afghan engineer, this novel explores the cultural shifts in post World War II Afghanistan.
The Source	1965	In The Source, Michener recounts the origins and rise of Judaism starting with early Hebrews and carrying the reader all the way through to the modern Arab-Israeli conflict.
The Drifters	1971	The Drifters examines the lives of young travelers as they search for meaning in the Vietnam war era.
Centennial	1974	Centennial, one of Michener's most critically acclaimed novels, tells the story of Colorado, the Centennial State, from its geologic origins up to the 1976 Bicentennial.
Chesapeake	1978	This novel recounts the history of a Maryland coastal community in Michener's trademark style.
The Watermen	1978	An excerpt from his larger novel, Chesapeake, which was published by Random House the same year.
The Covenant	1980	From the prehistoric bushmen to British colonists, Michener traces the history of South Africa from its origins to the Second Boer War.
Space	1982	The lives of scientists, astronauts, and politicians intertwine in this fictional account of the United States Space program.
Poland	1983	Inspired by his travels in Poland, this Michener novel examines Polish history and culture from the 1200s up until the 1980s.
Texas	1985	In this book, which spans over 400 years, Michener chronicles the origins, history and culture of Texas.
Legacy	1987	Legacy presents a fictionalized account of the Iran–Contra scandal through the eyes of a conflicted US lieutenant colonel.
Alaska	1988	This novel traces the background of Alaska from prehistory, through the gold rush, and into World War II.
Caribbean	1989	This novel explores the history of the Caribbean, telling of the arrival of Columbus, the days of the buccaneers, the rise of the Jamaican sugar plantations, and moves up to the problems of the present day.
Journey	1989	Journey, based on a chapter from Alaska, follows the trials and tribulations of a British mining expedition during the Klondike Gold Rush.
The Novel	1991	The Novel tells the story of a book, from its creation to publication, through the intersecting narratives of a writer, editor, reader, and critic.
Mexico	1992	An American journalist, Norman Clay, arrives in Mexico not only to report on a duel between two celebrated matadors but to learn more about his family's past.
Recessional	1994	Recessional, Michener's final novel, presents the challenges faced by a doctor caring for an unusual patient in a Florida hospice facility.
Miracle in Seville	1995	Told through the eyes of an American writer, Miracle in Seville explores bullfighting culture in Spain.
Matecumbe	2007	Set in Florida, Matecumbe is a small, character-driven story detailing the relationship of a mother and daughter, both divorced and living parallel lives.

=== Books—non-fiction ===
Title	Year published	Notes
The Future of the Social Studies ("The Problem of the Social Studies")	1939	Editor
The Voice of Asia	1951	The Voice of Asia, a compilation of fifteen articles published in 1951, presents Michener's personal experiences traveling through Asia after World War II.
The Floating World	1954	Michener, in the text accompanying these prints, details how Japanese printmakers in the Edo period kept their art alive in the face of government restrictions.
The Bridge at Andau	1957	Michener chronicles the experience of hundreds of refugees, fleeing brutal persecution by the Hungarian State Security Police
Rascals in Paradise	1957	In this collection of short pieces, Michener and Day present the thrilling tales of ten real life adventurers.
Japanese Prints: From the Early Masters to the Modern	1959	Featuring text written by Michener, this book presents sketches made by the artist Jack Levine during a trip to Japan. It also features notes by Richard Lane
Report of the County Chairman	1961	Michener, who served as the chairman of the Bucks County Citizens for Kennedy Committee, recounts the process of campaigning for John F. Kennedy in Pennsylvania.
The Modern Japanese Print: An Appreciation	1968	In this limited edition book, Michener provides commentary on ten works by Japanese woodblock print masters.
Iberia	1968	In this non-fiction travelogue, Michener explores the culture, history, and geography of Portugal and Spain.
Presidential Lottery	1969	Written in the run-up to the 1972 election, this non-fiction volume examines the limitations of the US electoral system and proposes reforms.
The Quality of Life	1970	Michener presents his reflections and criticisms of US politics and culture in the 1970s as well as his recommendations for the future.
Kent State: What Happened and Why	1971	In Kent State, Michener investigates the 1970 shooting of unarmed college students by the Ohio National Guard.
A Michener Miscellany: 1950–1970	1973	This compilation of essays features works by Michener published between 1950 and 1970.
Firstfruits: A Harvest of 25 Years of Israeli Writing	1973	Edited by Michener, Firstfruits collects outstanding Israeli short fiction from the first 25 years of the country's existence.
Sports in America	1976	In this non-fiction volume, Michener examines the phenomenon of sports culture in America and its inherent issues.
About Centennial: Some Notes on the Novel	1978	In this unique offering from Michener, he outlines the process of writing Centennial in this book distributed only to libraries and select booksellers.
James A. Michener's USA: The People and the Land	1981	Edited by Peter Chaitin; foreword by Michener
Collectors, Forgers—and a Writer: A Memoir	1983	Michener reflects on early influences in his life in this limited edition book.
Six Days in Havana	1989	Based on his research trip to Cuba for his novel Caribbean, Six Days in Havana presents Michener's recollection of the vibrant people and landscapes he encountered in Havana.
Pilgrimage: A Memoir of Poland and Rome	1990	Part travelogue, part memoir, in Pilgrimage Michener recounts his travels to Poland and Italy and reflects on his relationships with Pope John Paul II, Stan Musial, and others.
The Eagle and the Raven	1990	Recounts the period in Texas history when renegade Sam Houston emigrated to the Mexican state of Tejas and helped lead the 1836 revolution against Mexican president Santa Anna
My Lost Mexico	1992	Michener recounts the process of writing and editing Mexico, a novel which he set aside for 30 years before finishing it in 1992.
The World Is My Home	1992	The World Is My Home, Michener's widest arching memoir, presents the writer's reflections on both his life and career.
James A. Michener's Writer's Handbook: Explorations in Writing and Publishing	1992	.
Creatures of the Kingdom	1993	Collection of fifteen animal-focused segments from Hawaii, Centennial, Chesapeake, The Covenant, Texas and Alaska, and one original story.
Literary Reflections	1993	Literary Reflections, a collection of Michener's reminiscences, also includes the reprinted text of Collectors, Forgers—and a Writer and Testimony.
William Penn	1994	A monograph by Michener about the life and beliefs of William Penn, the founder and first governor of the Commonwealth of Pennsylvania,
Ventures in Editing	1995	In this limited edition book, Michener offers commentary on the writing and publishing process.
This Noble Land	1996	This Noble Land: My Vision for America, describes the nation's strength and weakness and the author's hopes for its future.
Three Great Novels of World War II	1996	A compilation of World War II novels featuring Michener's Tales of the South Pacific as well as Thomas Heggen's Mr. Roberts and Leon Uris' Battle Cry.
A Century of Sonnets	1997	This collection of poetry written by Michener contains over one hundred poems written over a span of seventy-years.

=== Adaptations ===
Title	Notes
South Pacific	1949 Broadway musical by Rodgers and Hammerstein based on the novel Tales of the South Pacific (1946)
The Bridges at Toko-Ri	1954 film based on the novella The Bridges at Toko-ri (1953)
Return to Paradise	1953 film based on the short story "Mr. Morgan" in the collection Return to Paradise (1951)
Men of the Fighting Lady (also known as Panther Squadron)	1954 film inspired by Michener's Saturday Evening Post article, "The Forgotten Heroes of Korea" Louis Calhern portrays Michener in the film.
Until They Sail	1957 film based on a short story included in Return to Paradise
Sayonara	1957 film nominated for 10 Academy Awards, won four; including Best Supporting Actress, for Miyoshi Umeki, the first East Asian Actress to win an Oscar. Based on the semi-autobiographical novel Sayonara (1954).
South Pacific	1958 film based on the Rodgers and Hammerstein musical in turn based on the novel Tales of the South Pacific (1946)
Adventures in Paradise	1959–62 television series created by Michener
Hawaii	1966 film based on the novel Hawaii (1959)
The Hawaiians	1970 film based on the novel Hawaii (1959)
Centennial	1978 TV miniseries based on the novel Centennial (1974)
Caravans	1978 film starring Anthony Quinn based on the novel Caravans (1963)
Space	1985 TV miniseries based on the novel Space (1982)
James A. Michener's Texas	1994 TV miniseries based on the novel Texas (1985)
South Pacific	2001 television movie based on the Rodgers and Hammerstein musical in turn based on the novel Tales of the South Pacific (1946)

== See also ==
- List of bestselling novels in the United States
- Edward Rutherfurd
