= Tales of the South Pacific =

1946 short story collection by James A. Michener

- First edition cover
- Author: James A. Michener
- Language: English
- Genre: Interrelated short stories
- Publisher: Macmillan, New York
- Publication date: January 28, 1947
- Publication place: United States
- Pages: 326

Tales of the South Pacific is a Pulitzer Prize-winning collection of sequentially related short stories by James A. Michener about the Pacific campaign in World War II. The stories are based on observations and anecdotes he collected while stationed as a lieutenant commander in the US Navy at the Espiritu Santo Naval Base in the New Hebrides Islands (now known as Vanuatu).

Written in 1946 and published in 1947, the book was loosely adapted in 1949 as the Broadway musical South Pacific, which, in turn, formed the basis of two films dating from 1958 and 2001.

== Book ==
The stories take place in the environs of the Coral Sea and the Solomon Islands. Michener, as narrator, gives a first-person voice to several of the stories through an unnamed "Commander" who performs duties similar to those he performed during World War II. Two stories are narrated by a named Navy pilot.

Recurring characters and several loose plot lines interconnect the stories. One plot line in particular is the preparation for and execution of a fictitious amphibious invasion, code-named "Alligator". The focus of the stories is, however, the interactions between Americans and a variety of colonial, immigrant, and indigenous characters.

The chronology of the stories begins with the building of an airfield on Norfolk Island before the Battle of the Coral Sea, in 1942, and goes through the early 1944 invasion of one of Michener's fictional islands. Although the stories are primarily about the U.S. Navy, most of the action is shore-based, and none of the stories concerns ships larger than a Landing Craft Infantry.

=== Structure ===
Tales of the South Pacific comprises nineteen stories, which are thematically linked in pairs: the first and final stories are reflective, the second and eighteenth involve battle, the third and seventeenth involve preparation for battle, and so on.

1. The South Pacific	19. A Cemetery at Hoga Point
2. Coral Sea	18. The Landing on Kuralei
3. Mutiny	17. Frisco
4. An Officer and a Gentleman	16. The Strike
5. The Cave	15. Those Who Fratenize
6. The Milk Run	14. The Airstrip at Konora
7. Alligator	13. Wine for the Mess at Segi
8. Our Heroine	12. A Boar's Tooth
9. Dry Rot	11. Passion
10. Fo' Dolla'

=== Recurring characters ===
The following characters appear in more than 2 stories:

Tony Fry (Navy): Stories 3, 5, 12, and 13.

Bus Adams (Navy pilot): Stories 6, 13, 14, and 15.

Luther Billis (SeaBee): Stories 9, 12, and 14.

== Critical reception ==
In 1948, the book prompted the renaming of the Pulitzer Prize for the Novel: determined to award the book, the Pulitzer Advisory Committee chose to lift their ban on short stories and expand the prize's definition to include "distinguished fiction published in book form", and renamed the prize the Pulitzer Prize for Fiction.

== Adaptations ==
=== Musical ===
The highly successful musical play South Pacific by Rodgers and Hammerstein, which opened on Broadway on April 7, 1949, was based on the stories in Tales of the South Pacific. In particular, the stories used were "Fo' Dolla'", about Bloody Mary, Liat, and Lieutenant Joe Cable; and "Our Heroine", about Nellie Forbush and Emile de Becque. Characters from other stories, such as Bill Harbison, Bus Adams, and Luther Billis, play minor or supporting roles.

Some of the characters from the stories were merged and simplified to serve the format of the musical. For example, the coastwatcher in the musical is an American Marine (Lt. Cable) assisted by an expatriate French plantation owner (Emile de Becque). In Michener's short story "The Cave" the coastwatcher is an English expatriate assisted by native islanders, and is a disembodied voice on a short-wave radio identifying himself only as "The Remittance Man". He is never seen by the other characters in Michener's short story until a search-and-rescue party finds his head impaled on a stake. The character of Liat, Cable's lover in the film, is a much more sophisticated and intelligent young woman in the book, but is reduced to a childlike caricature in the movie. The character of Emile de Becque in Michener's short story has eight mixed-race daughters by four different women, none of whom he married, when he meets the nurse Ensign Nellie Forbush; in the musical, he has two children (one daughter and one son) by a Polynesian woman whom he had married but who had died.

==== Films of the musical ====
The Rodgers and Hammerstein musical South Pacific was made into a feature film in 1958 with scenes shot on Kauai. It was adapted as a made-for television film in 2001 filmed in Queensland and Moorea.

=== Television ===
American television producer Bob Mann wanted Michener to co-create a weekly television anthology series from Tales of the South Pacific, with Michener as narrator. Rodgers and Hammerstein, however, owned all dramatic rights to the novel and did not give up ownership. Michener did lend his name as the creator of a different and unrelated television series, Adventures in Paradise, in 1959. The series had nothing to do with World War II, but rather followed the fictional adventures of a current-day schooner sailing around the South Pacific.

== See also ==
- Guadalcanal campaign
