= Cultural depictions of Robin Hood =

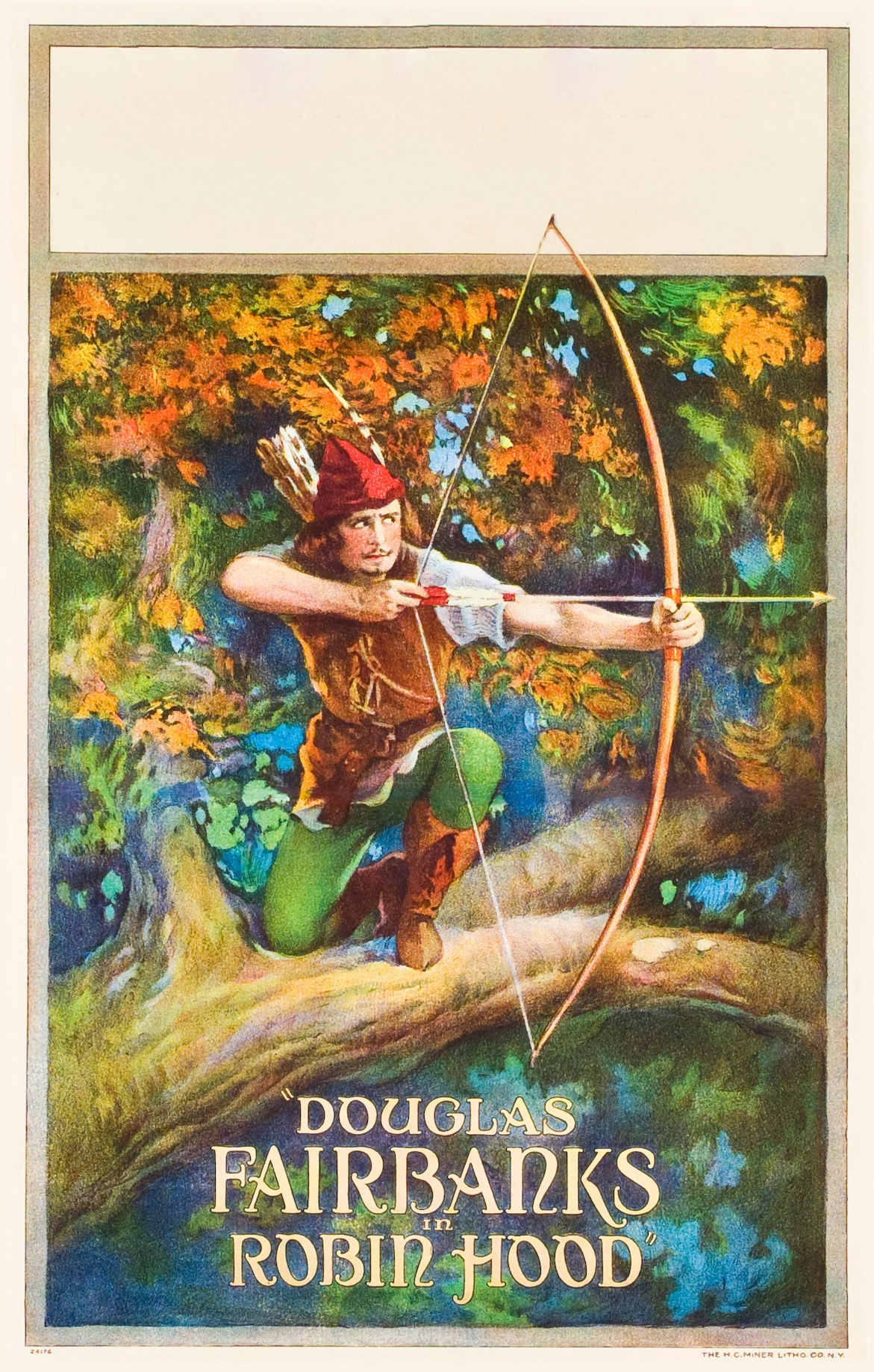
Movie poster for the 1922 United Artists Robin Hood film, starring Douglas Fairbanks.

The folkloric hero Robin Hood has appeared many times, in many different variations, in popular modern works.

== Theatre ==
Robin Hood has appeared in a number of plays throughout the medieval, early modern and modern periods. The first record of a Robin Hood play being performed is in Exeter in 1426–27. The earliest surviving text of a Robin Hood play is dated c.1475 and entitled Robyn Hod and the Shryff off Notyngham.

The plays which perhaps have been most influential upon the Robin Hood legend as a whole are Anthony Munday's The Downfall of Robert, Earle of Huntington and The Death of Robert, Earle of Huntingdon (1597–98). It is in these plays that Robin is first depicted as a nobleman. Further plays followed during the early modern period such as the anonymous Looke About You (1600) and Robin Hood and his Crew of Soldiers (1661).

== Radio ==
On 18 April 1992, BBC Radio 4 first broadcast John Fletcher's 90-minute radio play entitled The Legend of Robin Hood, which was a full cast drama that drew closely on the original Robin Hood ballads. It was directed by Nigel Bryant and featured music composed by Vic Gammon. As well as depicting some of Robin Hood's adventures in Sherwood Forest and Nottingham, it also covers a fruitless quest that Robin makes Little John to the Holy Land to help the crusaders.

On May 18, 2019, Augustine Institute released a full cast 12-part audio drama written and directed by Paul McCusker entitled The Legends of Robin Hood. Starring Gwilym Lee as Robin Hood (a.k.a. Robert of Locksley), Katie Foster-Barnes as Maid Marian (named Marian Fitzwalter in this version), with Robert Portal as Sir Guy of Gisbourne and Nicholas Boulton as Richard the Lionheart.

== Books ==
The first published prose account of Robin Hood's life appears to be the anonymously authored The Noble Birth and Gallant Atchievements of that Remarkable Out-Law, Robin Hood (1678). Material from this work was often plagiarised by criminal biographers in works such as: The Whole Life and Merry Exploits of Bold Robin Hood (1712), Alexander Smith's A Complete History of the Lives and Robberies of the Most Notorious Highwaymen, Footpads, Shoplifts and Cheats (1719), Charles Johnson's Lives and Exploits of the Most Noted Highwaymen (1734). In addition, there were numerous books printed throughout the late seventeenth and eighteenth centuries that went by the name of Robin Hood's Garland. These were cheaply printed collections of later Robin Hood ballads.

The first Robin Hood novel written, although not published, is Robert Southey's 'Harold, or, The Castle of Morford' (1791). This exists in manuscript form in the Bodleian Library. The first published Robin Hood novel was the anonymous Robin Hood: A Tale of the Olden Time (1819), and a few months later Ivanhoe by Walter Scott, 1819. Ivanhoe was Scott's first novel where history and romance is combined. Robin Hood in this book is the saviour of the nation. The Upper classes need the working classes as much as the working classes rely on their 'betters'. Scott's tale is significant because it is the first time that Robin is presented as an Anglo-Saxon freedom fighter, a theme which many later Victorian Robin Hood novels would utilise. The next novel following Scott was Thomas Love Peacock's novella Maid Marian. The novel was originally intended as a satire on continental conservatism and its enthusiasm for all things feudal and medieval, and in particular the unwarranted praise of aristocracy. Thus through his novella Peacock attempted to show how man's feudal overlords have always been the same: greedy, violent, cynical, and self-interested. Robin also appears as the principal protagonist of two tales printed in an early penny blood entitled Lives of the Highwaymen in 1836. This serialised tale, however, is little more than a reprint of the earlier biography of Robin Hood that appeared in Charles Johnson's work. In Thomas Miller's Royston Gower; or, The Days of King John (1838), Robin is not the principal protagonist but is an outlaw who comes to the aid of the title character after he defects from the Normans and decides to fight against King John for the establishment of a 'charter of rights'. G. P. R. James' Forest Days (1843), while not intended as a political or social commentary, is significant because it abandons the traditional dating of the Robin Hood story in the 1190s and instead places the Robin Hood legend during the Simon de Montfort rebellion (1264–67). By far the longest Robin Hood novel, standing at almost half-a-million words, is Pierce Egan the Younger's Robin Hood and Little John; or, The Merrie Men of Sherwood Forest (serialised 1838–1840). As in Ivanhoe, Robin is a Saxon, although he is not actually outlawed in the novel until nearly the end of the first book. The novel traces Robin's life from birth to death. Egan's text was translated into two French books, Le prince des voleurs (The Prince of Thieves), and Robin Hood le proscrit (Robin Hood the Outlaw), by Alexandre Dumas, between 1863 and 1864. Dumas' works were then retranslated back into English by Alfred Allinson in 1904. A 'companion' novel to Egan's text was published by J. H. Stocqueler in 1849 entitled Maid Marian, the Forest Queen; Being a Companion to "Robin Hood". The first Robin Hood novel written specifically for children appears to be Stephen Percy's Tales of Robin Hood (1840). John B. Marsh's children's book Robin Hood appeared in 1865, as did a penny dreadful entitled Little John and Will Scarlet (1865). The next major novel written was entitled The Merry Adventures of Robin Hood by Howard Pyle in 1883. In T. H. White's novel The Sword in the Stone (1938, later incorporated into The Once and Future King), young Wart (Arthur) and Kay have an adventure with a man they initially call Robin Hood, but are told that his real name is Robin Wood. His merry men refer to him as "Robin 'ood," dropping Ws instead of Hs, in the Nottinghamshire accent of the time. White's theory is supported by the fact that the French call him Robin des Bois, or Robin of the Woods.

- The Life and Adventures of Robin Hood by John B. Marsh (1835–1910), 1865.
- The Romantic History of Robin Hood, by Barry Pain, 1898.
- Robin Hood and His Merry Outlaws by J. Walker McSpadden (1874–1960), 1898.
- Young Robin Hood by George Manville Fenn, 1899, focuses on the young son, also named Robin, of the Sheriff of Nottingham learning from Robin Hood and Little John.
- Robin Hood: His Book by Eva March Tappan, 1903.
- Stories of Robin Hood Told to the Children H. E. Marshall, 1905.
- The Tale of Robin Hood and His Merry Men, Elinor Mead Buckingham, 1905.
- Robin Hood; His Deeds and Adventures as Recounted in the Old English Ballads by Lucy Fitch Perkins, 1906.
- The Story of Robin Hood and His Merry Men by John Finnemore (1863–1915), 1909.
- Bold Robin Hood and His Outlaw Band by Louis Rhead, 1912.
- Robin Hood by Henry Gilbert, 1912.
- The Story of Robin Hood by Bertha Evangeline Bush, 1912.
- Tales and Plays of Robin Hood by Eleanor Louise Skinner, 1915.
- Robin Hood by Paul Creswick (1866–1947), 1917.
- Robin Hood and His Merry Men by Sara Hawks Sterling, 1921.
- Robin Hood by George Cockburn Harvey, 1923.
- The Stories of Robin Hood by Nathaniel Moore Banta, 1923.
- Robin Hood and His Merry Men by E. C. Vivian, 1927.
- Robin Hood by Edith Heal, 1928.
- Robin Hood by Ula Waterhouse Echols, 1932.
- Bows Against the Barons by Geoffrey Trease, 1934, a leftist depiction of Robin Hood from the viewpoint of a young-adult protagonist.
- Robin Hood: The Prince of Outlaws by Carola Oman, 1937, is cited as "one of the most influential of the juvenile literary publications", and remained continuously in print for at least forty years.
- The Sword in the Stone by T. H. White, 1939, gives his "correct" name as Robin Wood; he is one of the figures that Wart meets during his education.
- Son of Robin Hood by Paul A. Castleton, 1941, and Son of Robin Hood in Nottingham, 1942.
- Chronicles of Robin Hood by Rosemary Sutcliff, 1950.
- Robin Hood by Antonia Fraser, 1955.
- The Adventures of Robin Hood by Roger Lancelyn Green, 1956.
- "The Silver Horn of Robin Hood" by Donald E. Cooke, 1956.
- Robin Hood: The Outlaw of Sherwood Forest by Orville Prescott, 1959.
- Tales of Brave Adventure by Enid Blyton, 1963.
- Robin in the Greenwood by Ian Serraillier, 1967, and Robin and His Merry Men, 1969
- The Adventures of Robin Hood by Patricia Leitch, 1979.
- The Death of Robin Hood by Peter Vansittart, 1981.
- Robin Hood by Catherine Storr, 1984.
- The Outlaws of Sherwood by Robin McKinley, 1988, a retelling in which Robin Hood is, in fact, the worst archer in his band, but whose shrewdness leads them through their dangers.
- Lady of the Forest (1992) and Lady of Sherwood (1999), both by Jennifer Roberson
- Sherwood by Parke Godwin, 1992, and Robin and the King, 1993
- The Forestwife trilogy by Theresa Tomlinson, 1993–2000.
- Robin Hood and His Merry Men by Jane Louise Curry, 1994, and Robin Hood in the Greenwood, 1995
- The Story of Robin Hood by Robert Leeson, 1994
- Robin's Country by Monica Furlong, 1994.
- Romance novelist Marsha Canham builds the Robin Hood legend through possible historical fact in her Robin Hood Trilogy set during the reign of King John of England: Through a Dark Mist (1991), In the Shadow of Midnight (1994), and The Last Arrow (1997).
- Robin Hood and Little John by Barbara Cohen, 1995.
- Robin Hood and His Miserable Men by Dick King-Smith, 1997.
- Robin Hood According to Spike Milligan by Spike Milligan, 1998, parodies the legend of Robin Hood.
- Robin Hood: The Boy Who Became a Legend by Kathryn Lasky, 1999.
- The Rowan Hood series by Nancy Springer, 2001–2005.
- Robin Hood and the Silver Arrow by Tony Bradman and Tony Ross, 2004.
- Robin Hood All at Sea by Jan Mark, 2005.
- Robin Hood's Best Shot by Ian Whybrow, 2006.
- The King Raven Trilogy (Hood (2006), Scarlet (2007), Tuck (2009)) by Stephen R. Lawhead, 2006, relocates the Robin Hood legends to Wales.
- In Lynn Viehl's Darkyn book series Robin Hood is one of the Darkyn (which are vampires). He gets his own romance story in the final novel Stay the Night (January 2009).
- Robin the Hoodie reimagines Robin Hood as a young troublemaker in modern-day Nottingham, complete with ASBO (2009).
- In Hodd, author Adam Thorpe explores the theory that the legendary Robin Hood is the mythologized creation of the narrator based on his time spent with the real outlaw.
- Angus Donald's Outlaw Chronicles, consisting of Outlaw (2009), Holy Warrior (2010), King's Man (2011), Warlord (2012), Grail Knight (2013) and The Iron Castle (2014) feature Robin Hood as Robert Odo.
- Robin Hood and the Golden Arrow by Robert D. San Souci, 2010.
- "The Thief, The Sheriff, His Bitch, and a Bastard" (2011) by H. E. Coleman
- Robin: Lady of Legend (2012) by R. M. ArceJaeger features a woman as Robin Hood.
- Scarlet (2012) by A. C. Gaughen
- The Books of the Wode (2013-2020) by J. Tullos Hennig are a reworking of Robin Hood stories and other legends (such as The Tale of Gamelyn). The series portrays Robin Hood and Maid Marian as siblings, with the primary romantic relationship between Robin and Guy of Gisborne.
- The Forest Lord Series (Wolf's Head (2013), The Wolf and the Raven (2014), Rise of the Wolf (2015) and Blood of the Wolf (2016)) by Steven A. McKay sets the legend in the 14th century, and also includes a number of novellas featuring Friar Tuck, Little John and Will Scaflock.
- The Devices Trilogy by Philip Purser-Hallard, starting with The Pendragon Protocol (2014) and continuing with The Locksley Exploit (2015)
- Lady Thief (2014) by A. C. Gaughen.
- Lion Heart (2015) by A. C. Gaughen.
- Robin Hood: Demon's Bane (2015–2017) by Debbie Viguié and James R. Tuck. A trilogy of novels.
- Marian (2016) by Ella Lyons. A young adult novel retelling from Marian's point of view, in which the Robin Hood she falls in love with is a girl.
- A Finder of Trails (2016) by Nick Collins. A retelling of the story featuring a young Robin and the Sheriff of Nottingham as friends, and recounts an adventure on which they embark together.
- Great Deeds Done beyond the Seas (2016) by Nick Collins. The second instalment of the two-part book series featuring a young Robin and Sheriff of Nottingham before they were adversaries and the conclusion of their adventure.
- The Hood Game: Rise of the Greenwood King (2016) by J.P. Reedman. First in a series reminiscent of TV's Robin of Sherwood.
- Robin Hood: The One Who Looked Good in Green by Wendy Mass, 2018.
- Nottingham (2019) by Nathan Makaryk.
- Brightfall (2019) by Jaime Lee Moyer. Follows Marian ten years after the normal story, after which Robin secluded himself in a monastery for unclear reasons.
- The Ghosts of Sherwood (2020) by Carrie Vaughn. Follows Robin, Marian, and their children twenty years after the normal story.
- The Heirs of Locksley (2020) by Carrie Vaughn. Follows the children of Robin and Marian. Sequel to The Ghosts of Sherwood.
- Robin Hood (2020) by Robert Muchamore. A young adult novel series.
- Travelers Along the Way: A Robin Hood Remix (2022) by Aminah Mae Safi. Female-led Robin Hood story that reframes the legend's tales of the Third Crusade from a Muslim perspective.

== Music ==
- One of Thomas Weelkes' madrigals, Since Robin Hood, which was originally published in 1598, referenced Robin Hood and a couple of his companions in a song that was otherwise mainly about a nine-day travel dance that Will Kemp did.
- The opera Robin Hood was written by George Alexander Macfarren (libretto: John Oxenford) and first produced at Her Majesty's Theatre, London in 1860. It was written for the voice of Sims Reeves, a star tenor, who played Locksley, and was first performed by him with Mme Lemmens-Sherrington (Marian), Mme Lemaire, Charles Santley and Mr. Parkinson, under the direction of Sir Charles Halle.
- W. H. Birch wrote an operetta called The Merrie Men of Sherwood Forest which was performed in 1871.
- The romantic opera Robin Hood, op. 34, was written by the German composer Albert Dietrich (1829–1908). It was first performed in Frankfurt am Main in 1879. A new production of this almost forgotten opera was given at the Theater Erfurt on March 20, 2011.
- Another opera called Robin Hood was written by Reginald De Koven and Clement Scott in 1889 and premiered in Chicago on June 9, 1890, with Jessie Bartlett Davis as Alan a-Dale.
- "Robin Hood" by Louis Prima and Bob Miketta (1944).
- The theme from the 1955 television series The Adventures of Robin Hood was covered by Gary Miller and released as a single (Pye N15020) in 1956. It reached #10 on the UK charts.
- The 1973 Disney animated film included five original songs: "Whistle Stop", a mostly instrumental piece, "Oo-De-Lally" and "Not in Nottingham", written and performed by Roger Miller, "Love", written by George Bruns and Floyd Huddleston and performed by the latter's then-wife Nancy Adams, and "The Phony King of England", performed by Phil Harris with a dance sequence traced from Snow White and the Seven Dwarfs, The Jungle Book, and The Aristocats.
- Legend, an album by Irish band Clannad, is the soundtrack for the ITV television series Robin of Sherwood (1984). It featured the main theme and single, "Robin (The Hooded Man)".
- Robert Steadman, who lived for some time in Nottingham, has written two musical compositions using the myths of Robin Hood:
  - "The Dethe of Robyn Hood" (1995) uses fragments of a mediaeval ballad as its text and is scored for narrator and wind band.
  - "Robin Hood & Little John" (2005) was commissioned by Southwell Choral Society as was premiered by them in Southwell Minster. It sets an anonymous mediaeval ballad about the first meeting of Robin Hood and Little John and is scored for choir and large ensemble.
- "Poor Boy (The Greenwood)" is a song composed by Jeff Lynne and performed by the Electric Light Orchestra (ELO) on their 1974 concept album "Eldorado" (subtitled "A Symphony by the Electric Light Orchestra"). The album is a collection of songs that tell the story of a dreamer who journeys into fantasy worlds to escape the disillusionment of his mundane reality. Track 5 "Poor Boy" forms the fourth dream and has the character fantasizing he is one of Robin Hood's merry men.
- The progressive acoustic band Nickel Creek recorded a song entitled "Robin and Marian" on their eponymous album.
- "Robin Hood" is the first single from German heavy metal band Edguy's 2011 album Age of the Joker. The music video depicts a humorous version of the legend (e.g. the quarterstaff match with Little John being decided with rock-paper-scissors), with the band's lead singer Tobias Sammet taking the role of Robin Hood and the other band members as unnamed Merry Men.
- In 2013, The Fiechters released an instrumental music piece, Robin Hood, that was inspired by the legend in their album, Magical creatures.
- In 2017, pianist John Burke scored an outdoor production of Robin Hood.
- The Legend of Robin Hood is singer/songwriter Chris de Burgh's twenty-second original album, a musical, released in September 2021 by Rockware.

== Video games ==
The character of Robin Hood appears, either as a playable character or as a major supporting character, in the following games:

- Robin to the Rescue (Solar Software, 1983)
- Robin Hood (Xonox, 1983)
- Super Robin Hood (Codemasters, 1985)
- Robin of the Wood (Odin Compter Graphics, 1985)
- Robin of Sherwood: The Touchstones of Rhiannon (Adventure International, 1985)
- Defender of the Crown (Cinemaware, 1987)
- The Curse of Sherwood (Mastertronic, 1987)
- The Adventures of Robin Hood (Millennium Interactive, 1991)
- Robin Hood: Prince of Thieves (Virgin Games, 1991)
- Conquests of the Longbow: The Legend of Robin Hood (Sierra Entertainment, 1991)
- Robin Hood: Legend Quest (Codemasters, 1993)
- Defender of the Crown II (Commodore Electronics, 1993)
- Age of Empires II: The Age of Kings (Microsoft, 1999)
- Robin Hood (EA/Light & Shadow Productions, 2001)
- Robin Hood: The Legend of Sherwood (Wanadoo, 2002)
- Robin Hood: Defender of the Crown (Capcom, 2003)
- Robin Hood — The Siege (PS1, 2004)
- Robin Hood's Quest (Broadsword Interactive, 2007)
- Defender of the Crown: Heroes Live Forever (eGames, 2007)
- Fate/Extra (Epoch/Type-Moon, 2010)
- Robin Hood: The Return of Richard (Nordcurrent, 2010)
- Robin's Quest: A Legend Born (Gogii Games, 2010)
- Crusader Kings II (Paradox Interactive, 2012)
- Fate/Grand Order (Delight Works/Type-Moon, 2015)
- There is a manifestation of Robin Hood in Persona 5, as he is one of the two Personas of Goro Akechi. However, his primary persona is a variant of Loki, which fuses with Robin Hood to become Hereward in the true ending of Royal.
- Hood: Outlaws & Legends (2021)
- Gangs of Sherwood (2023)
- Robin Hood - Sherwood Builders (2024)
- In the video game Pokémon Sun and Moon, Decidueye is a dual Grass/Ghost-type Pokémon, the evolved form of Dartrix, and the final evolved form of Rowlet, the Grass-Flying type starter of the Alola region, having been frequently compared to Robin Hood.

== Strategy games ==
- Avalon Hill published a board game based on the legend called The Legend of Robin Hood.

== Comic books ==
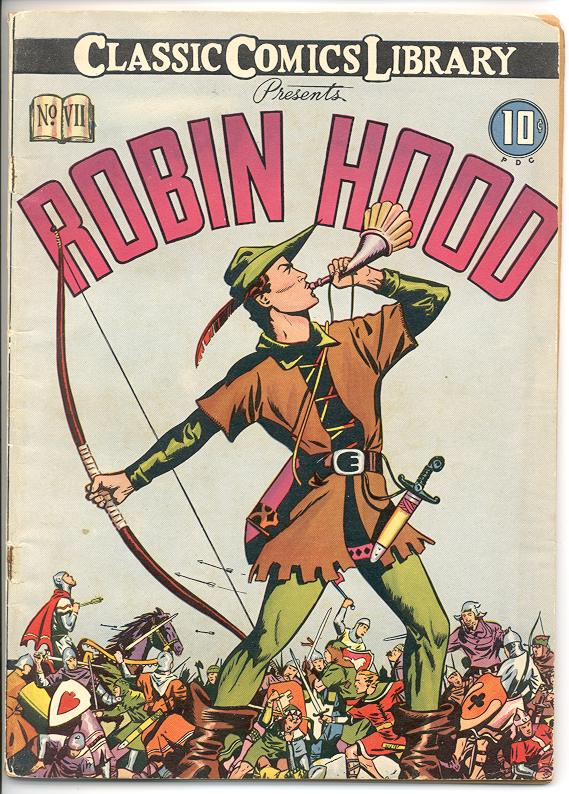
Classic Comics issue #7

- As a public domain character with an established reputation, Robin Hood was an attractive feature for comic book publishers from the birth of the medium. The first continuing Robin Hood stories were written and drawn by Sven Elven and appeared in the DC Comics title, New Adventure Comics vol. 1 #23 through #30 (1938). There was also a Robin Hood back up story in Green Hornet #7 through #10, written by S. M. Iger.
- In 1935, the Toronto Telegram published the newspaper comic strip "Robin Hood and Company" by writer Ted McCall and (initially) artist Charles Snelgrove. It appeared in various other papers, and in 1941 was converted into comic book form by Anglo-American Publishing as one of the first Canadian comic books.
- A small renaissance of Robin Hood comics occurred in the late 1950s, starting with the little-known "Rodger of Sherwood" stories in the Young Heroes anthology series #39 through #37 by American Comics Group. That same year, Robin got his first title comic book from Magazine Enterprises which ran for eight issues, three with a Richard Greene photo cover. Brown Shoe Co., maker of Robin Hood Shoes, published seven giveaway issues starting in 1956. Robin soon attracted attention from more established comic publishers such as Charlton Comics, who retitled Danger and Adventure to Robin Hood and His Merry Men starting with issue #28. Quality comics published Tales of Robin Hood until issue #7, then was bought by DC Comics who continued until issue #13 and included a crossover with Wonder Woman, making it the longest lasting English language Robin Hood series. DC also published Robin Hood stories in their Brave and the Bold anthology series from #5 to #15.
- In the 1960s, Dell published a couple of Robin Hood one-shots, one a re-telling of the traditional legend, the other a Disney TV show tie-in. Then, in 1974, Gold Key Comics produced a 7 issue tie-in with the Disney animated film. Eclipse published a three-part miniseries in 1991, perhaps a tie in with the Kevin Costner film. Finally, there have been various one-shots produced by Moonstone Books and Avalon Communications.
- In 1991, DC produced a series called Outlaws, with writing by Michael Jan Friedman and art by Luke McDonnell. It was a re-imagining of the legend set in a future, somewhat post-apocalyptic, time- something akin to the future depicted in films such as Mad Max.
- Also in 1991, Eclipse Comics published a three issue mini series.
- In 1998, Caliber Comics launched a four-issue mini-series about Robin Hood's daughter called "Robyn of Sherwood" by writer Paul D. Storrie and various artists. Many years later the comic was republished with new art by Rob Davis (who had drawn the final issue of the original series.) Storrie also wrote other Robin Hood comics, some adapting the original ballads.
- Robin Hood and his band appear in one issue of the Vertigo Comics series Fables. Along with other folk heroes, they give their lives to buy time for the last ship to flee to the mundane world.
- In 2007, Xeric award-winning cartoonist Steve LeCouilliard began a comedy web-comic called "Much the Miller's Son" telling the story of Robin Hood from the point of view of a minor character. It has since been collected in two volumes with a third projected for summer 2011.
- The superhero Green Arrow possesses obvious traits of inspiration that originate from Robin Hood; most notably being a skilled archer, swordsman, and an affinity for wearing green.
- The superhero Robin's appearance was modeled after Robin Hood, with his name taken from him as well
- The Sonic the Hedgehog comic series from Archie Comics features a band of Freedom Fighters based upon Robin Hood and his Merry Men, with associated characters reflecting other figures in the Robin Hood mythos. Robin serves as the inspiration for Hedgehog king Rob O' The Hedge, with an Echidna wife and son named Mari-An and Jon (obviously alluding to Maid Marian and Little John). Further allies include the Deer Friar Buck, Allan Quail, and Munch the Rat; the group was originally pitted against the villainous High Sheriff of Snottingham.
- In 2012, Zenescope published Robyn Hood, a re-imagining of the character with a female protagonist.
- In 2013, the Image Comics book Five Ghosts featured a literary ghost with similarities to Robin Hood.
- In 2018, Oni Press published the graphic novel Merry Men, a queer re-imagining of the Robin Hood legend, written by Robert Rodi and illustrated by Jackie Lewis.

== Other ==
- The Green Feather Movement of 1954 referenced the Merry men as a protest against anti-communism.
- The 2000 Year Old Man, who is played by Mel Brooks and first performed publicly in the 1960s, satirises the Robin Hood legend, by saying that "he stole from everyone and kept everything."
- In 1987, Iron Crown Enterprises produced Robin Hood: The Role Playing Campaign book written by Graham Staplehurst, a supplement for the Rolemaster, Fantasy Hero and Middle-earth Role Playing role-playing games. This book provided rules for running adventures in the setting of the Robin Hood legends.
- A Robin Hood Foundation was created in New York City in 1988 as a charitable organisation.
- In 1992, Steve Jackson Games released GURPS Robin Hood, a supplement for their eponymous role-playing game system. This book provided rules for GURPS players to have adventures in the medieval Robin Hood setting, as well as for running Robin Hood-themed adventures in other settings, such as the Old West or a cyberpunk future. Peggy Schroeck and Robert M. Schroeck wrote GURPS Robin Hood. While the book itself is out of print, it is currently available in electronic format.
- In 2000, in Elmira, Ontario, a local high school theater teacher founded a festival called "Robin in the Hood (RITH)" which takes place in Gibson Park at the beginning of June. In 2020, due to COVID-19, the festival went on a one-year hiatus, tried a virtual festival in October 2021, and returned in 2022.
- In 2007, the University of Nottingham offered a MA course on the subject of Robin Hood.
- Also in 2007, the Tony Award-winning musical Curtains, follows the mystery of a star named Jessica Cranshaw in "Robbin' Hood" of the Old West, a western version of the Robin Hood storyline who is murdered on her opening night.
- Robin Hood became the official mascot of Nottingham Forest Football Club at the beginning of the 2007–08 football season, replacing Sherwood the Bear.
- The Green Party named their proposed tax on banks in their 2015 manifesto after Robin Hood.
- The Labour Party pledged to enact a 'Robin Hood tax' on the financial sector if they win the 2017 general election.
- In the newspaper comic strip Flash Gordon by Alex Raymond, the character of Prince Barin bears strong similarities to Robin Hood. These similarities include wearing green, using a bow, living in the forest and being a rebel against an unjust regime.
- The newspaper comic Wizard of Id features a minor character named "Robbing Hood", an obvious pun on Robin Hood's name.
- Lego had a theme based on Robin Hood and his merry men, called Forestmen.
- In archery, a "Robin Hood" is the term used for an arrow splitting the shaft of an arrow already in the target.
- The annual Sherwood Forest Faire Renaissance fair near Austin, Texas draws inspiration from the Robin Hood legend.
