= Eleanor, Fair Maid of Brittany =

Claimant to the English and Breton succession (c. 1184–1241)

Eleanor of Brittany
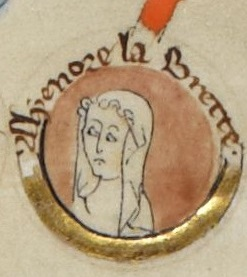
- Alyenore la Brette in a 13th-century genealogy (British Library)
- Born: c. 1182–4
- Died: 10 August 1241 (aged c. 57–59); Bristol Castle (or Corfe Castle, Dorset), England
- Burial: Amesbury Abbey, Wiltshire, England
- House: Plantagenet
- Father: Geoffrey of England
- Mother: Constance, Duchess of Brittany

Eleanor, Fair Maid of Brittany (Note: Although her uncle John allowed her to use the title of Countess of Richmond as well as that of titular Duchess of Brittany, her younger half-sister Alix of Thouars used it at the same period (Everard and Jones, The Charters of Duchess Constance of Brittany and her Family (1171–1221), p 169)) (c. 1184 – 10 August 1241), also known as Damsel of Brittany, Pearl of Brittany, or Beauty of Brittany, was the eldest daughter of Duke Geoffrey II and Duchess Constance of Brittany. Her father was the fourth son of King Henry II of England and Duchess Eleanor of Aquitaine, and she was the niece of the English kings Richard I and John. As a potential threat to ascendency to the English throne, John imprisoned her in 1202 and she was held in captivity until her death. Like Empress Matilda and Elizabeth of York, Eleanor's claim to the English throne gained little support from the barons, under the expectation that the monarch should be male, despite legal provision for a female monarch. Some historians have commented that her imprisonment was "the most unjustifiable act of King John".

== Early life ==
Eleanor was born around 1184 to Duke Geoffrey II and Duchess Constance of Brittany. Her father died when she was very young. After Geoffrey's death, his children were raised by his brother King Richard I of England and their mother, Duchess Eleanor of Aquitaine. By the death of her father, Eleanor was the first in line of Breton succession, so King Philip II of France asked for her wardship. However, her grandfather King Henry II of England took her wardship in advance, and the birth of her brother Arthur in 1187 removed her status as the first heiress. Being King Richard's ward meant that she was under Angevin custody; thus even her mother, Constance, did not consider her a potential heir to the Duchy of Brittany, which weakened her later claim. Keeping her custody under Richard was probably the price for her mother to rule Brittany.

As Arthur was the heir presumptive to England and Brittany, Eleanor was one of the most marriageable princesses. In 1190, after Richard failed to marry his younger sister Joan of England to Al-Adil I, brother of Saladin, he proposed that Eleanor should be the bride instead; but the negotiation was also in vain, as Al-Adil showed no interest in Christianity. In 1193, Eleanor was engaged to Frederick, son of Leopold V, Duke of Austria, as part of the conditions to release Richard, whom Emperor Henry VI had taken prisoner. However, when she was on the way to Austria with Baldwin of Bethune the next year, Leopold died so the marriage never took place. Under order of Pope Celestine III she returned to England, accompanied by her grandmother Eleanor.

In summer 1195, a marriage between Eleanor and Louis, son of Philip II of France, was suggested as an alliance between Richard and Philip, but negotiations failed again. Henry VI opposed the marriage; and the failure was also a sign that Richard would replace Arthur as heir to England with John. This soon led to a sudden deterioration in relations between Richard and Philip. A marriage with Odo III, Duke of Burgundy, may have been suggested, for in 1198 Philip forbade Odo to marry any relatives of Richard without his permission.

== Imprisonment ==
=== Under John ===
Upon the death of King Richard in 1199, a power struggle commenced between the supporters of John and the 12-year-old Arthur. The date of her imprisonment by John is unknown, but Pipe Roll 2 dated c. 1199 – 1200 indicates John provided "necessaries" to Eleanor, and Arthur once complained that his sister was controlled by John. At the request of Constance, Eleanor was once released from royal custody and united with her mother and brother in France. Therefore, Eleanor was probably already under John's control when Arthur's forces were defeated and he was captured at the Battle of Mirebeau in August 1202, or she was perhaps captured along with Arthur. Arthur disappeared mysteriously while in captivity the following year.

In December 1203, John fled from Normandy, taking Eleanor with him as his captive. She was reportedly taken to the north of England and then to Bristol, guarded by four knights. In spring 1204, Philip II demanded that Eleanor be released in order to marry his younger son. Initially, John organized local barons to visit Eleanor in order to prove her well-being. In 1206, John briefly detained her at Brough Castle in Cumbria, entrusting her to Robert de Vieuxpont, who was its custodian, before moving her to Bowes Castle and then to Corfe Castle, along with 25 French knights loyal to her, guarded by Stephen de Turnham. After an attempt to escape, 22 of them were recaptured and were starved to death.

Eleanor lived in Corfe's Gloriet Tower, took her meals in the Long Hall and was allowed to walk abroad along the walls. She was allowed three maids and was provided fabric for clothes and bedding, and pocket money as much as 5 marks per quarter. She also received from John a saddle with gilded reins and scarlet ornaments, a gift which implies that she was not closely confined. John also sent her figs and almonds. A week's shopping list for Eleanor in captivity that has survived suggests the aristocratic diet at that time: Saturday: bread, ale, sole, almonds, butter, eggs. Sunday: mutton, pork, chicken and eggs. Monday: beef, pork, honey, vinegar. Tuesday. pork, eggs, egret. Wednesday: herring, conger, sole, eels, almonds and eggs. Thursday: pork, eggs, pepper, honey. Friday: conger, sole, eels, herring and almonds.

As the eldest daughter of Constance, Eleanor should have been recognized as duchess of Brittany after the death of Arthur. Instead, the Breton barons, fearing John's claims to rule Brittany in representation of Eleanor's rights or to marry her to a vassal loyal to England, made her younger half-sister Alix duchess instead. Eleanor was styled Duchess of Brittany and Countess of Richmond, as successor to her brother, but this was only a titular title as Alix became duchess of Brittany in 1203 and was also styled Countess of Richmond, even making charters about this estate. The Breton barons, ignorant of Eleanor's whereabouts, were ready to install her as duchess in case she were released. John permitted her to use the titles of Brittany and Richmond and even talked with Breton nobles about letting her go. In 1208 John had Eleanor write a letter to Breton barons and churchmen such as the bishops of Nantes, Vannes, and Cornouaille, describing her life in captivity, expressing her hope of being liberated and asking them to arrive in England to negotiate her release:

"... uos rogamus attencius quatinus uos supranominati ad dominum auunculum meum Regem Angliae in Angliam ueniatis scituri pro certo quod aduentus uester Deo uolente nobis et uobis ad magnum cedet commodum et honorem, et per Dei gratiam ad liberacionem nostram." (I ask you most solicitously that you, the above-named, would travel to England, to my lord uncle, the King of England, knowing for certain that your coming, God willing, will confer great honor and benefit to ourselves and yourselves, and, by the grace of God, our liberation.)

This letter is the only surviving document written by Eleanor. This negotiation was however in vain, and many of her supporters were banished. Eleanor was forced to entrust Brittany and Richmond to John, who referred to her as his "dearest niece" in communicating with Bretons. John did not give her the lands which belonged to the counts of Richmond. Instead he gave these lands to Eleanor's former stepfather, the Earl of Chester.

In 1209, William I of Scotland sent his daughters Margaret and Isobel to John as hostages to keep peace between Scotland and England, and they were imprisoned at Corfe Castle along with Eleanor. In June 1213, John sent green robes, lambskin-trimmed cloaks, and summer slippers to the captive princesses. They were sometimes allowed to ride out under guard. Eleanor was given robes of dark green with capes of cambric and hats trimmed with miniver. John once approved a doctor to prescribe medicine for Eleanor when she was sick.

In 1213, John used Eleanor to blackmail her brother-in-law Peter I, Duke of Brittany, into an alliance with England, tempting him with the offer of Eleanor's earldom of Richmond, but Peter kept loyal to France even after John's capture of Peter's elder brother Robert. In 1213 John declared England a papal fief, and Pope Innocent III thus claimed to be guardian of Eleanor. In February 1214 John campaigned in Aquitaine and Poitou with Eleanor (as well as Queen Isabella and Prince Richard) against Alix, hoping to get Breton support and establish Eleanor as his puppet duchess; his ambition was dashed in his defeat at the Battle of Roche-au-Moine. In July John withdrew to England with Eleanor still in hand. In the same year, John again talked with Breton nobles about the rights and freedom of Eleanor, but, after this expedition, John became convinced that he could get nothing from her claim to the duchy; he recognized Alix as duchess of Brittany and never again supported Eleanor even in name. Up to then Philip II had taken the bulk of Angevin territories, and neither Bretons nor Philip II ever positively requested the release of Eleanor, as it seemed more stable for them to have her imprisoned in England rather than become a French duchess.

On 15 July 1215 John instructed Eleanor's keeper Peter de Maulay to customize clothing and bed sheets for Eleanor, stating that although shirts and bed sheets should be made of high-quality linen, they were not made of his own best fabric; however, if this was the only fabric that was suitable enough, Peter would be allowed to purchase it as much as possible with John's money. This meant that John hoped that Eleanor will always maintain a subject after him.

The tensions between John and the Anglo-Norman barons finally began to spill over into the First Barons' War in 1215, and Louis of France led an invasion to England in support of his claim to the English throne, as husband of Blanche of Castile, a maternal granddaughter of Henry II, whilst Innocent III argued that Eleanor had a better claim than John. When Magna Carta was issued that year, it was demanded that all John's hostages including Scottish and Welsh princesses be released; Eleanor, however, was excluded.

There are different accounts of where Eleanor was held over the years. Some sources say that she was imprisoned at Corfe; others say at Bristol Castle for all of the almost 40 years. However, the Close Rolls of Henry III confirm that Eleanor had run up a bill of £117 while imprisoned by John at Gloucester Castle.

=== Under Henry III ===
John died towards the end of the civil conflict in 1216; although, according to the laws of primogeniture, the claim of Eleanor was better, English barons allowed King John's young son, Henry III of England, to succeed. As her claim to England and Aquitaine was still a threat to his son, before his death John stated that Eleanor should never be released. Thus, albeit never a rallying point for English discontent during the early part of Henry III's reign, Eleanor remained imprisoned. Her survival was ensured according to the treaty between England and France. In 1218, Eleanor ceased to be styled Countess of Richmond after William Marshal, 1st Earl of Pembroke, Henry's regent, recognized Peter of Brittany as the earl. Henry III styled Eleanor, now with no title left, as "king's kinswoman", or "our cousin".

In 1221, there was a rumour of a plan to rescue Eleanor and deliver her to the king of France. In September, Eleanor accompanied Isobel of Scotland in Southampton, while both received robes, cloaks, hats, and headscarves lined with squirrel and deer skin. In 1225, Peter de Maulay was accused of planning with the king of France to free Eleanor, and he subsequently fell out of favour. The allegation may have been false, to discredit de Maulay and Peter des Roches, who also fell out of royal favour in spring 1234. Whether the plot existed or not, Eleanor was moved away from the coast. From June 1222, she was transferred between Gloucester, Marlborough and Bristol. She was finally settled at Bristol from June 1224 for a time and was visited by Henry III. Gloucester Castle temporarily moved all its prisoners elsewhere to accommodate Eleanor. A chamber in the tower of Gloucester Castle was thought to have been occupied by her. When Eleanor was relocated to Marlborough Castle, the council instructed that additional cavalry and crossbowmen should be added to the existing guards there. In 1227, Jocelin of Wells, Bishop of Bath and Glastonbury, signed an order to increase the staff of Bristol Castle to help keep Eleanor confined.

Though Henry III established a law that could prevent Eleanor from legal succession to the crown and considered that Eleanor would never legally inherit, he and his government took actions from 1223 to keep Eleanor captive. They appointed and monitored her keepers and frequently changed them. Between 1225 and 1226, Bristol's diet accounts showed the use of locks, keys, and other safety equipment. For example, the entry in 1225 records the cost of repairing the door lock on 27 June, purchasing a door key for one penny on 25 August, and spending four pence on the key to the tower on 25 December. In 1227, the Close Roll accounts mention the keeping of the keys to Eleanor's room. Such records might mean that, for a period of time, Eleanor was locked in her tower or room.

Nonetheless, Eleanor still enjoyed the treatment due a princess similar to the reign of John. Records indicate that she had her own apartments at the castles where she was imprisoned and received generous gifts from the royal family such as game, fruit, nuts, and wine. She also had proper but unshowy clothes. From 1225, she received an allowance. Between June 1225 and April 1233, the Court of Justice recorded an annual payment of 20 marks of relief to Eleanor, usually divided into quarterly payments of five marks; in 1229, the annual amount increased to 25 marks, roughly equivalent as her status as daughter of a prince. From the 1220s onwards, Eleanor began to give away her stipends. Guilloreau speculates this might indicate that she became more serious after her childbearing years. Henry also paid for her bodily and medical expenses, and the Bristol Castle rolls from 1225 to 1226 record the cost of Eleanor's two baths.

The governor of Bristol exhibited her to the public annually, in case of rumors that the royal captive had been injured. This might suggest that the local people were sympathetic to her. In 1224 the mayor, bailiffs, four reliable citizens, and specific noblewomen visited her once or twice a week to confirm her safety, listened to various expenses, and recounted to Henry. Henry once sent her 50 yards of linen cloth, three wimples, 50 pounds of almonds and raisins respectively, and a basket of figs; he offered her another saddle, a proof that she could still go horse-riding; he once asked the mayor and bailiff to increase her household there. In 1230 she was provided 2 ladies-in-waiting. Sometimes local mayor, bailiffs, responsible civilians and certain noblewomen visited her to prove her safety.

In the spring of 1234, there were protests against Peter de Roches, claiming that Eleanor, the royal princesses and many noblewomen were controlled by foreigners or were being despised for marrying foreigners. But such protests were not directed at the deprivation of Eleanor's rights and freedoms, but at her being controlled by foreigners. In 1234–1235, money was allowed her for books for the chapel. As her guard Peter de Rivaux lost power in 1234, both she and the castle were entrusted to William Talbot. In 1235, Peter of Brittany renounced Richmond. Perhaps as a result of Peter's rebellion, Eleanor's status improved slightly. In October, Henry granted the manor of Swaffham of the Earldom of Richmond to her, ordering the income and harvest of the estate to be hers, and writing to her about arranging representatives to obtain estate income, thus her income became comparable to a daughter of a king; he gave her game and robes more frequently than before, and allowed nun Margaret Bisset and the Countess of Hereford (the Earl's wife or mother) to visit her. A survey in 1237 lists Eleanor as landowner of Swaffham. Despite these changes in the relationship between the cousins, Henry never supported Eleanor's claim to Brittany, perhaps for the statement of Pope Gregory IX that the descendants of Alix and Peter were undoubtedly the heirs of Brittany in 1235; nor did he give her most of the Earldom of Richmond; she remained imprisoned, and there was no indication that she had ever visited her manor. In 1236 William of Savoy maternal uncle of Queen Eleanor, was granted the Honour of Richmond.

In 1236, Eleanor had a dispute with the wife of William Talbot, and Henry ordered that William's wife be removed from her side. In 1237, Henry wrote a letter to William, stating that Eleanor was eager to reconcile with his wife and ordering William to have his wife speak to and remain with Eleanor as long as Eleanor was willing.

In November 1237, Eleanor met Henry in Woodstock in good health. In the same year, she again was kept at Gloucester Castle. Sheriff John Fitz Geoffrey paid her expenses. As Rivaux reconciled with Henry, William ceased to govern Gloucester Castle. On Easter or November 1238, Eleanor was transferred back to Bristol Castle. In 1241, Henry regained Swaffham, and Eleanor only received a cash income from it by the gift of the king.

During her imprisonment for as long as 39 years, Eleanor was innocent of any crime, and she was never tried or sentenced. She was viewed as a "state prisoner", forbidden to marry and guarded closely even after her child-bearing years. Scholar Gwen Seabourne believes that when Henry was in power, Eleanor had already passed the childbearing age and was at least apparently unlikely to pose any risk to his regime; however, he remained determined to imprison her, which made his devout, kind, and innocent persona no longer so credible; with his suspicion and calculation not inferior to John, he should also be condemned more.

== Death and legacy ==
Eleanor died as a nun in 1241 at the age of 57 or 59. She was initially buried at St James' Priory, Bristol, then reburied at Amesbury Abbey, according to her wishes, announced by Henry. She also donated her body there. Considering the association between Amesbury and the Plantagenets, Eleanor's final choice of burial place was probably a sign of submission and loyalty to her dynasty, but it may also have been her last protest about the fate of herself and her brother Arthur, as the abbey was dedicated to Virgin Mary and St Melor, a young Breton prince murdered by his wicked uncle who usurped his throne. However, neither burial place has a memorial for her remains.

The Chronicle of Lanercost claims that the remorseful Henry had given a gold crown to Eleanor to legitimize himself and his descendants shortly before her death, and only three days later the crown was donated to young Prince Edward (the future Edward I of England) as a gift. Another version says that she only wore the crown for one day before returning it.

The Annales Londonienses records the event of Eleanor's death, referring to her as "Alienora quondam comitis Britanniæ filia, in custodia diuturni carceris strictissime reservata" ("Eleanor, the daughter of the late Count of Brittany, long established in the custody of the strictest prison reserved"), and notes that she was the rightful heir to England, although some years after her death Henry was still unwilling to admit that he was initially not the hereditary king of England. The Annals of Tewkesbury record the death "IV Id Aug" in 1241 of "Alienora de Britannia consanguinea domini regis Henrici Angliæ" ("Eleanor of Brittany a blood relative of the lord King Henry of England"). The Chronicle of Lanercost records Eleanor as being a most beautiful, determined, and tactful woman. The limited sources about her character are consistent with this assessment and suggest that she was never resigned to her fate, as even decades of confinement could not force her to relinquish her rights although there was little hope of their being fulfilled. Contemporary historian Matthew Paris simply notes "about this time died Eleanor, daughter of Geoffrey, count of Brittany, who had long been kept in close confinement", with no further detail of her life or situation. Florentii Wigorniensis Monachi Chronicon Ex Chronids records, "Alienor, filia Galfridi comitis Britannia soror Arturi, obiit. ("Alinor, daughter of Galfrid, Earl of Britannia, and sister of Arthur, dies.)"

The bailiffs there were commanded to provide tapers and alms for her obsequies. Henry ordered her funeral to be as dignified as possible. Tapers, alms and candles for her obsequies totalled £20 7s. In 1246 and 1250 Henry arranged for a priest to say daily masses in a chapel at Marlborough Castle and Bristol Castle respectively in memory of Eleanor; In 1268 Henry gave the manor of Melksham, Wiltshire, a place that Eleanor had been fond of, to Amesbury for the souls of Eleanor and Arthur, ordering the convent to commemorate them along with all kings and queens. Thus Eleanor became a benefactress to the abbey.

== Portrayals ==
No one made Eleanor the heroine of any prose or poem for a long time, and the first academic article with her as its heroine did not come into existence until 1907.

Eleanor sometimes appears in speculative fiction, for example, in Mary Robinson's Angelina (1796). In Thomas Costain's novel Below the Salt, the author has Eleanor escape, marry a knight with land in Ireland, and raise a family there. The series Through a Dark Mist, In the Shadow of Midnight, and The Last Arrow by Marsha Canham is about the rescue of Eleanor, suggesting that William Marshal also wanted Eleanor to be liberated. Eleanor appears in the novels Here Be Dragons by Sharon Kay Penman, Sirocco Wind from the East by Virginia Ann Work, and as the heroine in The Shimmering Sky by Rik Denton. Eleanor's life story is also told in first person in The Captive Princess by J.P. Reedman.

In her poem The Lament of Eleanor of Bretagne, the Victorian English novelist and poet Menella Bute Smedley imagines Eleanor's melancholy feelings as she aged under weary imprisonment.
