= The Last Arrow =

1997 novel by Marsha Canham

- Author: Marsha Canham
- Language: English
- Genre: Historical fiction Romance
- Publisher: Dell Publishing
- Publication date: 1997
- Publication place: Canada
- Pages: 454
- ISBN: 978-0440222576
- Preceded by: In the Shadow of Midnight

The Last Arrow is a 1997 historical novel by Canadian author Marsha Canham, the third instalment of her "Medieval" trilogy inspired by the Robin Hood legend set in 13th-century England. The novel was published by Dell Publishing in 1997 as a sequel to Canham's 1994 story In the Shadow of Midnight. It received generally positive reviews from book critics.

Canham became inspired to write a new interpretation of the Robin Hood legend after experiencing a dream. She considered having several different characters represent the famous outlaw before deciding on Lord Robert Wardieu, one of the main characters featured in The Last Arrow (and the son of the hero in the first instalment Through a Dark Mist).

== Plot ==
=== Historical background ===
King John has been monarch for fifteen years, overseeing a disastrous reign that has driven England further into debt, lost territories in France, alienated his barons, and placed corrupt, cruel men in positions of power. Many countrymen begin speculating on the fate of John's lost nephew Arthur of Brittany, the long-lost rightful heir to the throne before being usurped by John. The whereabouts of Arthur's sister, Princess Eleanor, is also a mystery, though rumours speculate that she was rescued by a group of knights many years ago.

=== Plot summary ===
Meanwhile, Princess Eleanor, secretly blinded by King John to bar her from power, has been hiding in an English abbey to live out the rest of her days. Her protector, Lord Henry de Clare, has disguised himself as a "Friar Tuck" and kept a close eye over the abbey. One day, Eleanor's maid Marienne is almost assaulted by guardsmen of Guy de Gisbourne, the sheriff of Nottingham; Henry defends her and is taken prisoner.

Outside the walls of Château d'Amboise, Lady Brenna Wardieu, the master archer daughter of Lord Randwulf de la Seyne Sur Mer, encounters a knight whilst out hunting. Brenna remains suspicious of the mysterious knight, Griffyn Renaud de Verdelay, rightfully so since he intends to kill her brother Robert for a large reward from King John. Despite this, she and Griffyn are attracted to each other but spend much of their time verbally sparring. Lord Randwulf is sent a message from Marienne with Eleanor's ring and the warning "They have taken Lord Henry." Intending to discover the status of Eleanor's secret, Randwulf sends Robert, his friend's son Will FitzAthelstan, and several others to England. Brenna overhears the plan and demands to accompany them.

Before leaving for England, they travel to a nearby tourney at Château Gaillard to avoid attracting the suspicions of King John and his minions. Their contact, the Welshman Dafydd ap Iorwerth, is captured before he can find Robert's group; before dying, his torturers Lord Bertrand Malagane and his sadistic lover Solange de Sancerre discover enough to suspect Robert is on a mission to rescue Eleanor. They intend to have Robert, the group's leader and a great tourney champion, killed. Griffyn was sent for from Burgundy for this task, and upon meeting him they pay him one thousand English sterlings, though they fail to tell him Robert's plans to find the princess. Griffyn is told to stay away from the Wardieus.

However, Griffyn and Brenna secretly consummate their relationship soon after, and rather than killing Robert he joins their mission. Brenna learns that Griffyn is an Englishman named Rowen Hode, Earl of Huntington, who has been passing as the famous "Prince of Darkness", a Burgundian knight unmatched in the lists. Five years previously he competed against Robert, a match that ended in a draw which caused Griffyn to lose all of savings and belongings, and the life of his wife. He has sought revenge ever since, but realises that he was at fault for his predicament, not Robert. Griffyn loses to Robert, and is almost killed by Malagane before being rescued by Brenna and the others.

Before leaving for England, Robert reveals that Princess Eleanor has a secret ten-year-old son by Henry de Clare. Eleanor only wishes for her son to grow up happy away from politics, and they are seeking her out to secure the safety of mother and son. Once in England, they secure the help of outlaws led by Henry de Clare (who has been going by the title "the King of Sherwood"). After almost dying due to a trap set by Gisbourne and Malagane, they rescue Henry from Nottingham Castle. Eleanor tells them of a secret royal charter signed by King Henry I in which he granted concessions and liberties. Later, Eleanor and Henry die of an illness within hours of each other, and a lone arrow is fired into Sherwood Forest to mark their graves. Griffyn and Brenna marry and have four children.

== Development ==
Canadian author Marsha Canham began writing about the legend of Robin Hood in her novel Through a Dark Mist, being inspired by her love of the Errol Flynn films and a recurring dream of a "beautiful blonde-haired damsel in distress, held captive in a cave high on a cliff, rescued by two men cloaked in monks' robes, wielding bows and arrows." Through a Dark Mist saw the invention of "the Black Wolf of Lincoln", a character meant to be "heroic enough to have sired such a legendary hero" as Robin Hood. However, she realized that this character, nor his son Eduard in her next novel In the Shadow of Midnight, fit her conception of Robin Hood. Instead, the Black Wolf's other son Robin would represent the outlaw – "conceived in the magical waters of the Silent Pool, destined to some great future enterprise that would carry his name down through the centuries." Robin's story formed the main narrative in The Last Arrow.

Reflecting back on her trilogy, Canham said that she took "great pains and even more perverse pleasure in skirting around the edges of the actual legend, choosing instead to suggest how the many elements of several heroic characters blended together to create the fabled Prince of Thieves." Canham later recalled that The Last Arrow was a "blatant ripoff of the part of the legend where Robin dies and in order for his body to remain hidden for all time, an arrow is shot into the forest and where it landed was where he was buried."

== Release and reception ==
The Last Arrow was published in 1997 by Dell Publishing. It was the final installment in Canham's Medieval trilogy, the other two being Through a Dark Mist (1991) and In the Shadow of Midnight (1994). Publishers Weekly gave a mostly positive review to The Last Arrow, noting that while its first half was "weighed down by excessive background information, much of it awkwardly related in dialogue," the novel still contained "rousing action, a strong sense of medieval life, a satisfying love story and intriguing spins on historical events as well as the familiar Robin Hood characters [that] should bring readers back for more."

Kristin Ramsdell of the Library Journal felt the villains' love of "sadistic sexual torture may offend some," but opined that the novel nevertheless had "beautifully done historical detail." Ramdsell added that while its "description occasionally slows the pace of the story, fans of both the Robin Hood legend and of medieval tales of derring-do will like this one." Alison Cunliffe, writing for the Toronto Star, called The Last Arrow a "rich, entertaining and utterly different take on the legend." Jane Sullivan, writing for The Sydney Morning Herald, recommended the entire "swashbuckling" trilogy for "hopeless romantics," while Rebekah Bradford of The Post and Courier called the series an "inventive reimagining."

== See also ==
- List of historical novels
- Robin Hood in popular culture
