= Guy of Gisbourne =

English folklore character from Robin Hood

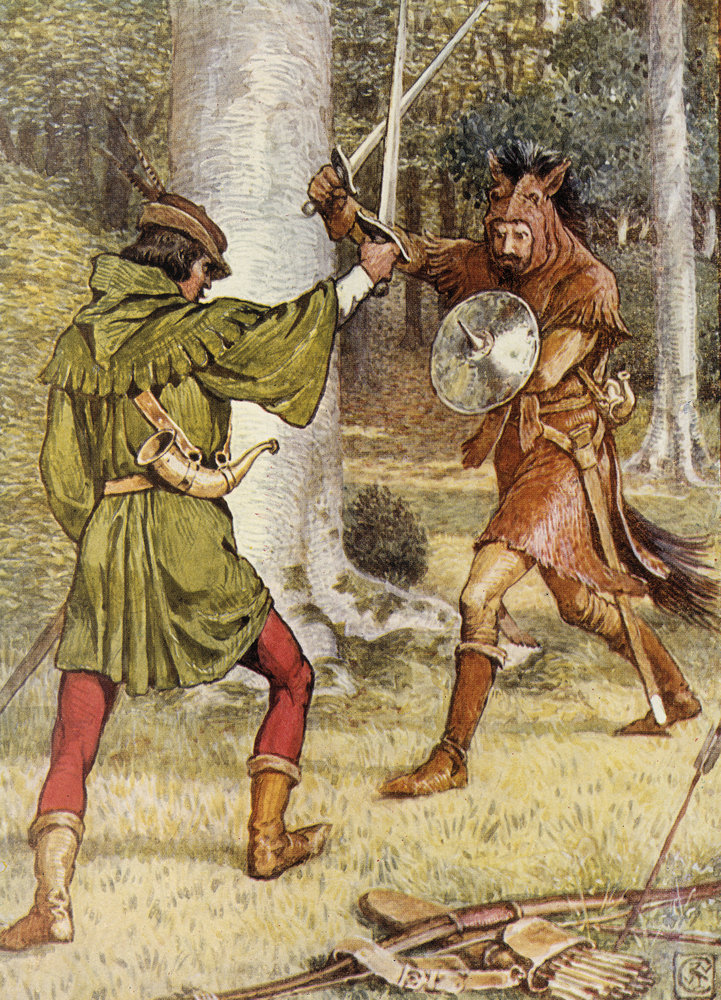
Guy duelling with Robin Hood, from Robin Hood and the Men of the Greenwood by Henry Gilbert, illust. Walter Crane (1912)

Sir Guy of Gisbourne (also spelled Gisburne, Gisborne, Gysborne, or Gisborn) is a character from the Robin Hood legends of English folklore. He first appears in "Robin Hood and Guy of Gisborne" (Child Ballad 118), where he is an assassin who attempts to kill Robin Hood, but is killed by him. In later depictions, he has become a romantic rival to Robin Hood for Maid Marian's love.

== Textual background ==
The Child ballad "Robin Hood and Guy of Gisborne" dates from 1650 but its origins are much older than that, judging from the similarities with the play Robyn Hod and the Shryff off Notyngham, which is known from a fragmentary manuscript dated to c. 1475.

== Summary of the Child ballad ==
Robin Hood and Little John walk through the forest. Robin speaks of a bad dream he had, of two men attacking him. While talking, they spot a distant stranger leaning on a tree. Little John tells Robin to wait while he approaches the stranger, but Robin objects as if accused of cowardice, telling John he would like to break his head. John marches off in a huff, and is promptly captured by the Sheriff of Nottingham and tied to a tree, to be hanged. Meanwhile, Robin goes up to the stranger, Guy of Gisborne, who is clad in a horsehide robe.

Guy's outfit is described thus:

A sword and a dagger he wore by his side,
Of manye a man the bane;
And he was clad in his capull-hyde [horse-hide]
Topp and tayll and mayne.

...

"I dwell by dale and downe," quoth hee,
"And Robin to take I'me sworne;
And when I am callèd by my right name
I am Guy of good Gisborne."

Guy is a hired killer seeking Robin Hood. They have a shooting contest, and Robin wins with ease. Robin identifies himself (as "Robin Hood of Barnsdale", in South Yorkshire) to the suspicious Guy, and the two fight. When Robin trips, Guy stabs him, but (after a brief prayer to Mary) Robin kills him with his sword. He dons the distinctive horsehide, cuts off Guy's head, sticks it on the tip of his bow and slashes the face, rendering it unrecognisable. He then blows Guy's horn to signal victory to the Sheriff. Disguised as Guy, and carrying what he passes off as Robin Hood's head, Robin goes to rescue Little John. He convinces the sheriff to be allowed to kill Little John, but instead cuts him loose with an "Irish knife". John then takes a bow and shoots the Sheriff through the heart.

== In popular culture ==
Although he has made many appearances in 19th- and 20th-century variants of the Robin Hood legends, Guy's only constant is villainy, but a frequently occurring theme is the "love triangle story" involving Robin, Marian, and Guy, a theme adopted from 19th-century theatrical adaptations.

=== Literature ===
In Howard Pyle's influential novel The Merry Adventures of Robin Hood (published in 1883), he is shown as a crude, coarse outlaw, known for his cruelty and murderous habits. The chapter closely follows the plot of the ballad.

In Simon Hawke's 1984 novel The Ivanhoe Gambit, Sir Guy is the Sheriff of Nottingham and married to Marian, who runs off to join the Merry Men after three failed attempts to murder him.

The 1956 novel The Adventures of Robin Hood by Roger Lancelyn Green portrays Guy as the right-hand man of the Sheriff of Nottingham, and incorporates his desire to have Marian for himself. Robin Hood spares Guy's life several times, but eventually has enough and kills him, at which point he disguises himself in Guy's armor to free some of his captured men.

In Stephen R. Lawhead's 2006 novel Hood (King Raven Trilogy), Sir Guy, a knight-soldier, is the chief henchman of Abbott Hugo de Rainault.

The character appears in J. Tullos Hennig's The Books of the Wode series (2013–2020). Guy, born Gamelyn, was a childhood friend and eventual lover to Rob before becoming a Templar and returning as Guy de Gisbourne.

=== Film ===
In the 1912 version of Robin Hood, he is determined to marry Marian and captures Robin Hood; he ties him to a tree, but by the end of the movie the roles are reversed.

In the Douglas Fairbanks starring silent movie Robin Hood, he is played by Paul Dickey and the 1938 Errol Flynn film The Adventures of Robin Hood by Basil Rathbone. In both versions, Guy is a nobleman and Prince John's chief supporter, and a far more prominent and dangerous man than the Sheriff of Nottingham. Prince John proposes Guy to Maid Marian as a prospective husband. Henceforth, Guy often appears as a bitter rival to Robin for Maid Marian's affections. In the 1938 film, Robin engages Guy in a duel to the death, one of the most famous sword fights in cinema history, whilst in the 1922 film, Robin takes him on without a sword and kills him with his bare hands.

Guy is absent from the Disney animated film Robin Hood (1973). Instead, he is replaced by Sir Hiss (voiced by Terry-Thomas).

The role of Guy of Gisbourne has also been interpreted on film by Tom Baker (The Zany Adventures of Robin Hood, 1984) and Michael Wincott (in the movie Robin Hood: Prince of Thieves, 1991), where he is said to be the Sheriff's cousin. In the 1991 film, Guy is murdered by the Sheriff halfway through the movie after failing repeatedly to capture Robin.

In the 2010 movie Robin Hood directed by Ridley Scott, actor Mark Strong mentions in promotional interviews that his character, Sir Godfrey, is based upon Guy of Gisbourne.

In the 2018 Robin Hood, Sir Gisborne (Paul Anderson) was Robin's commanding officer in the Crusades, but Robin turned against him when he saw Sir Gisborne kill a young man even as the boy's father pleaded for mercy. After Robin adopts his identity as 'the Hood', Gisborne is recalled to England by the Sheriff to hunt down the Hood, but despite the reputation of his men, they are no match for Robin's training.

In the 2026 film The Death of Robin Hood, Guy of Gisborne (Murray Bartlett) was a former adversary of Robin Hood, who had become a leper working as caretaker of the priory where he was being treated. Robin is brought to the priory to be healed under a false name, but does not remember Guy. On his deathbed, Guy reveals to Robin who he was and that he recognises him, but urges him not to tell the prioress that he was Robin Hood, as Robin had killed her husband.

=== Television ===
Gisbourne (spelled "Gisburne") was portrayed by Robert Addie in the British television series Robin of Sherwood (1984–1986). He is originally the Chief Gamekeeper for Abbot Hugo de Rainault, but in the first series' second episode "The Witch of Elsdon" becomes the henchman of Sheriff Robert de Rainault. In the third series episode "The Cross of St. Ciricus", it is revealed that he is actually and unknowingly the illegitimate son of the Earl of Huntington and the half-brother of the second Robin Hood (Jason Connery); this plotline was intended to be followed, but the series ended without resolution.

In the 1991 TV movie Robin Hood, Jürgen Prochnow plays "Sir Miles Folcanet", a character with much in common with modern versions of Guy.

He was portrayed by Clive Revill in the Star Trek: The Next Generation episode "Qpid" in its fourth season. Q sends the crew of the USS Enterprise to a Robin Hood scenario of his creation, where they must save the life of Captain Picard's occasional paramour, Vash, who must either marry Sir Guy or be executed.

In the 1990s CBBC comedy show Maid Marian and her Merry Men, Guy—played by Ramsay Gilderdale—is the nephew of King John.

In the BBC's 2006 Robin Hood, Guy of Gisborne is portrayed much more seriously by Richard Armitage, and is the Sheriff of Nottingham's second-in-command. He is originally depicted as a dark character, and is shown as an active enforcer of the Sheriff's cruelty, but at the same time, he is in love with Marian, showing conflicted attempts to redeem himself in her eyes.
