= Outlaw (novel) =

2009 novel by Angus Donald

- Author: Angus Donald
- Language: English
- Series: Outlaw Chronicles
- Genre: Historical fiction
- Publisher: Little Brown
- Publication date: 10 July 2009
- Publication place: England
- Media type: Print
- Pages: 384
- ISBN: 978-0-7515-4208-0
- Followed by: Holy Warrior (2010)

Outlaw is the first novel of the eight-part Outlaw Chronicles series by British writer of historical fiction, Angus Donald, released on 10 July 2009 through Little, Brown and Company. The début novel was relatively well received.

== Plot ==
The plot centres around a character named Alan Dale, based on Alan-a-Dale. Alan, who comes from abject poverty often going hungry for days, is caught in the middle of Nottingham stealing a hot beef pie. He manages to escape immediate punishment by running away and, as the notorious outlaw Robert Odo (Robin Hood's real name in the novel) is holding court in the local church, his mother pays for Alan to be taken into his service, saving him from the Sheriff of Nottingham's vicious justice. Alan never sees his mother again as he departs that night to live in the vast expanse of Sherwood Forest under the tutelage of the most notorious outlaw in English folklore. A few days later it emerges that Robin was close friends with Alan's father, an exceptional trouvére or minstrel, which leads Robin to take Alan under his wing and become his mentor. As the legend of the outlaw Robin Hood spread in the coming centuries, it was said that Robin was a contemporary and supporter of King Richard the Lionheart, driven to outlawry during the misrule of Richard's brother John while Richard was away at the Third Crusade, but this is not the story that spreads during Alan's and Robin's own time. At the time, it is even rumored that Robin was granted a king's pardon, which he later repudiates and returns to the greenwood.

== Reception ==
The novel has been relatively well received by reviewers and authors alike. Gareth Wilson, of Falcata Times, stated that "The tale is not only well written but told with a freshness that has a sense of history injected as the tale clearly shows". Author Faith L. Justice stated in her blog that she found Outlaw to be "fast-paced with well-developed characters, plot twists, and an exciting climax. I read the second half of the book straight through. It's a well-told tale. I'd recommend it to anyone who likes historical fiction and enjoys a different take on an old story." Justice also felt, however, that she "didn't want to read about another selfish person being held up as a hero. I want a modern-day Robin Hood (or better yet thousands of Robin Hoods) to stand up to power and make things better. Donald's mafia boss Robin didn't do it for me."

Conversely, fellow historical fiction author Ben Kane stated that "Outlaw is a thoroughly welcome addition to my bookshelf", describing Donald's depiction of 13th-century England as "excellent, well researched and full of detail; so too are his gripping fight scenes. His torture scenes are excruciatingly well written – I found myself cringing at two of them in particular." It was also accredited as the "Début of the month" by Love Reading for July 2009.

== See also ==
- Holy Warrior
- King's Man
