= In the Shadow of Midnight =

1994 novel by Marsha Canham

- Author: Marsha Canham
- Language: English
- Genre: Historical fiction
- Publisher: Dell Publishing
- Publication date: 1994
- Pages: 416
- ISBN: 978-0440206132
- Preceded by: Through a Dark Mist
- Followed by: The Last Arrow

In the Shadow of Midnight is a 1994 historical novel by Canadian author Marsha Canham, the second instalment of her "Medieval" trilogy inspired by the Robin Hood legend set in 13th-century England. The story centres on the rescue of Princess Eleanor of Brittany, the rightful heiress to the English throne, who is held captive by her uncle King John. The novel was published by Dell Publishing in 1994 as a sequel to Canham's 1991 story, Through a Dark Mist.

A dream inspired Canham to reinterpret the legend of Robin Hood. She initially intended that Eduard FitzRandwulf – one of the main characters in In the Shadow of Midnight – would represent her vision of Robin Hood, before choosing another character who would be featured in the final instalment, The Last Arrow (1997).

== Plot ==
=== Historical background ===
The story begins in April, 1203, at Rouen Castle. Arthur, Duke of Brittany, rightful heir to the English throne, is murdered in secret by his usurper uncle, King John, to prevent further rebellions against John's precarious reign. John had unsuccessfully attempted to leverage Arthur's sister, Eleanor of Brittany, as a means of persuasion for Arthur to recognize his right to the throne; with her brother dead, Eleanor becomes a claimant to the throne and remains in John's custody in England.

=== Plot summary ===
At Pembroke Castle, Lady Ariel de Clare – a fiercely independent eighteen-year-old who rebels against the womanly role society expects of her – discovers that she has been betrothed by King John to one of his retainers, Reginald de Braose. Ariel is outraged, having been promised by her uncle, the powerful William Marshal, that she would choose her own husband. To avoid the match with such an unpleasant man, she decides to travel to France to find her uncle; but, before departing, Ariel rashly agrees to wed the visiting Welsh lord Rhys ap Iorwerth as a means of thwarting John's plans—and immediately regrets her choice. Accompanying Ariel to France are her older brother, Lord Henry de Clare, and his friend Sedrick of Grantham. Rhys instructs his brother Dafydd to bring the marriage offer to William Marshal, hoping that an alliance between their two families will help him gain political leverage over their older brother Llywelyn, Prince of Gwynedd.

The Clares' journey takes them to Amboise Castle, the home of Lord Randwulf de la Seyne Sur Mer, champion of the dowager queen Eleanor of Aquitaine and the former outlaw known as "Black Wolf" (hero from the events of the first book). At Amboise, William Marshall reveals a secret plan to rescue Princess Eleanor and place her on the English throne. Randwulf's illegitimate son, Eduard FitzRandwulf, is tasked with the rescue, having had a long friendship with the princess. Ariel, Henry, Dafydd, Sedrick, Randwulf's eldest legitimate son Robin, and Randwulf's old friend Sparrow the dwarf accompany him in the guise of a bridal party en route to Wales for Ariel's marriage to Rhys. Eduard and Ariel feel attraction for the other, but initially spend most of their interactions verbally sparring.

The group departs secretly, posing as knights returning from the Crusades (Ariel impersonates a squire). After several violent encounters with ruffians and suspicious knights, they discover that Eleanor is being held at Corfe Castle, on the southern coast of England. Ariel realises the princess is their mission, and she and Eduard come close to consummating their relationship. Once at Corfe, they contrive to get into the castle by showing letters of permission from Marshall, the pretence being Ariel's supposed impending marriage to de Braose. Eduard is horrified to find that John has had Eleanor blinded as a means of dissuading others from supporting her. They rescue the pious, gentle princess and her maid Marienne and bring them to a priory to live out the rest of her days in peace. Henry remains to protect them. Meanwhile, Ariel and Eduard have fallen in love and she breaks her engagement to the Welsh lord.

== Development ==
"That was what gave me the idea for the sequel, In the Shadow of Midnight, where the lost princess is found, and somewhere in there the whole Robin Hood theme started to take shape and I had a blast adding characters from the legends and making it look like that had been my intention all along."

— Author Marsha Canham on discovering the story of Eleanor of Brittany

Canadian author Marsha Canham began writing about the legend of Robin Hood in her novel Through a Dark Mist, being inspired by her love of Errol Flynn's films and by a recurring dream of a "beautiful blonde-haired damsel in distress, held captive in a cave high on a cliff, rescued by two men cloaked in monks' robes, wielding bows and arrows." Canham had almost completed Through a Dark Mist when she came across something mentioning the "lost princess of Brittany". This discovery prompted her to add the young Eleanor to that story before finishing, and gave her the idea to write a sequel centred on her story.

Through a Dark Mist saw the invention of "the Black Wolf of Lincoln", a character meant to be "heroic enough to have sired such a legendary hero" as Robin Hood. She followed this idea – the creation of the Black Wolf's son as a representation of Robin Hood – with In the Shadow of Midnight but ultimately decided that "Eduard Fitz Randwulf was not quite the man I was looking for." Despite Eduard not quite fitting the role Canham was desiring to fill, her supporting characters, such as Marienne and Friar Tuck, were meant to "conceivably form the nucleus of the legend." She opted to follow another character as a better fit for the legendary man, also named Robin, in her trilogy's final novel The Last Arrow.

== Release and reception ==
In the Shadow of Midnight was published in 1994 by Dell Publishing. It was the first installment in Canham's Medieval trilogy, the other two being Through a Dark Mist (1991) and The Last Arrow (1997). Jane Sullivan, writing for The Sydney Morning Herald, recommended the entire "swashbuckling" trilogy for "hopeless romantics," while Rebekah Bradford of The Post and Courier called the series an "inventive reimagining."

== See also ==
- List of historical novels
- Robin Hood in popular culture
