= Robin Hood and Guy of Gisborne =

Child ballad, Robin Hood tale

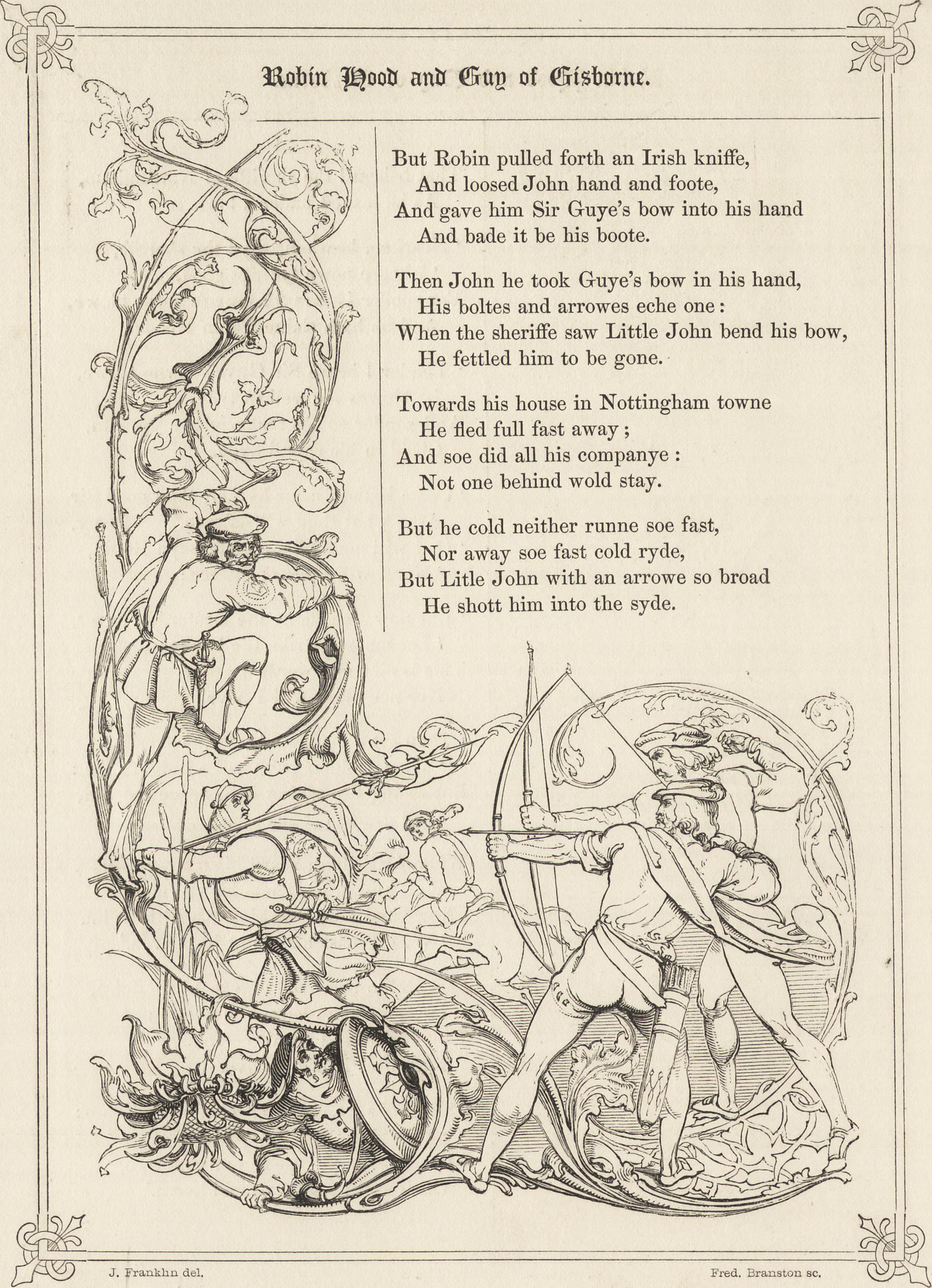
- "Robin Hood and Guy of Gisborne" from The Book of British Ballads (1842)

Song
- Genre: Folk

"Robin Hood and Guy of Gisborne" (Child 118) is an English-language folk song about Robin Hood. It introduces and disposes of Guy of Gisborne, who remains next to the Sheriff of Nottingham the chief villain of the Robin Hood legend.

This ballad survives in a single seventeenth-century copy (in the Percy Folio) but has always been recognised as much older in content, possibly older than "Robin Hood and the Monk". A play with a similar plot, Robyn Hod and the Shryff off Notyngham survives in a fragmentary manuscript dated to c. 1475.

The Oxford Companion to English Literature describes it as the best known of the Robin Hood ballads. But it is also the most often cited, along with "Robin Hood and the Monk", for excessive brutality. Guy comes to Barnesdale to capture Robin Hood, but Robin kills and beheads him. Meanwhile, Little John has been captured by the Sheriff, but Robin rescues him by impersonating Guy of Gisborne.
