= Alan-a-Dale =

Character from the Robin Hood legend

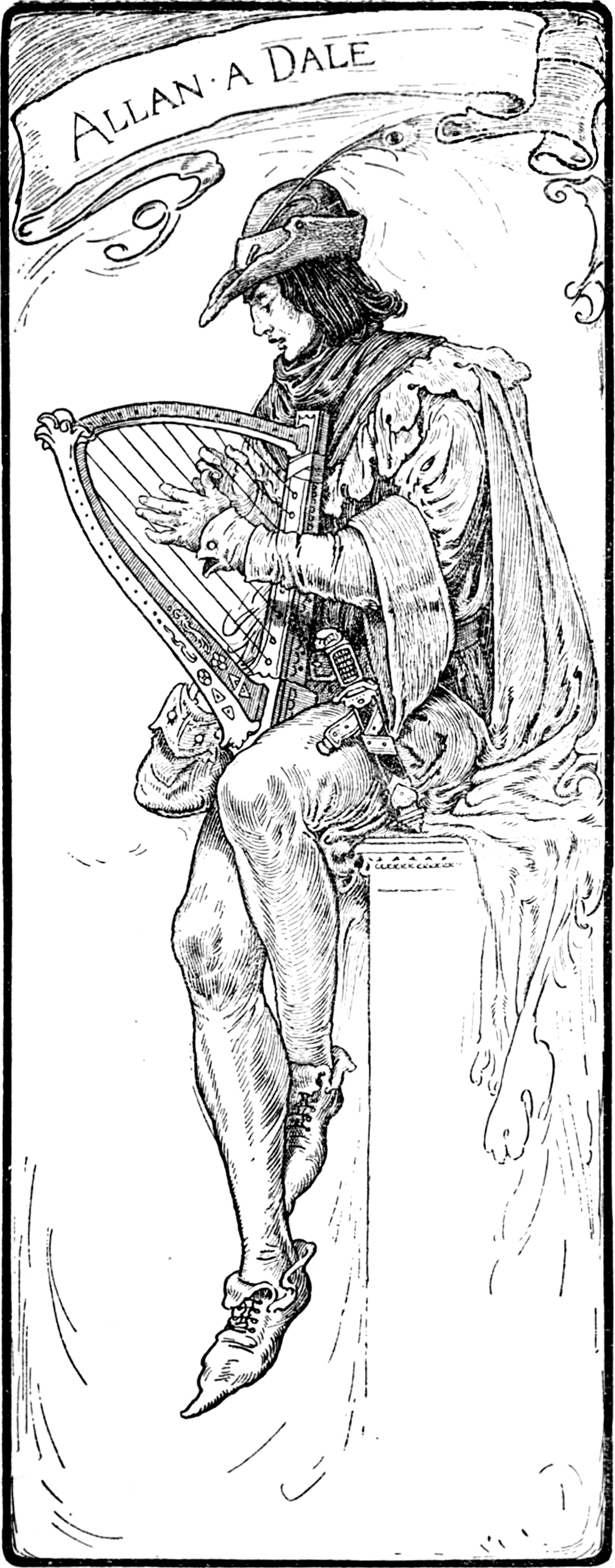
1912 depiction of Alan-A-Dale by Louis Rhead

Alan-a-Dale (first recorded as Allen a Dale; variously spelled Allen-a-Dale, Allan-a-Dale, Allin-a-Dale, Allan A'Dayle etc.) is a figure in the Robin Hood legend. According to the stories, he was a wandering minstrel who became a member of Robin's band of outlaws, the "Merry Men".

He is a relatively late addition to the legend; he first appeared in a 17th-century broadside ballad, Child Ballad 138, "Robin Hood and Allan-a-Dale", and, unlike many of the characters thus associated, managed to adhere to the legend. In this tale, Robin rescues Alan's sweetheart from an unwanted marriage to an old knight. They stop the bishop from proceeding with the ceremony, and Robin Hood, dressed in the bishop's robes, marries Alan to his bride. In other versions it is Little John or Friar Tuck who performs the ceremony.

Another variant appears in which the hero is not Alan but Will Scarlet, but Alan has taken over the role completely.

Howard Pyle uses this tale in his book The Merry Adventures of Robin Hood, but changes several details. He gives Alan's sweetheart the name Ellen, and introduces Friar Tuck into the story; Tuck is sought out specifically as the only priest who will perform the wedding in defiance of the bishop, and therefore, this tale is combined with that of Robin Hood and the Curtal Friar.

In Pierce Egan the Younger's story Robin Hood and Little John, Alan is given the name Sir Allan Clare; he is an armed knight, not a minstrel, and he is the brother of the Maid Marian. His sweetheart is Lady Christabel, the daughter of the Sheriff of Nottingham, who wants to give her to an old knight friend of his. The "Allan-a-Dale" name is given to his estates in Sherwood Forest; he is not given a major role after he and Christabel are married by Little John (or Robin Hood or Friar Tuck, see above, who takes the place of the Bishop of Hereford), though he helps the Merry Men from time to time.

Alan plays a prominent role in some later plays, children's novels, films, and television shows.

== Modern incarnations ==
- Florence Wickham and Louise Le Baron shared the role of Alan-a-Dale in the comic opera Robin Hood by Reginald De Koven and Harry B. Smith (1913).
- Alan-a-Dale was played by Lloyd Talman in Robin Hood (1922).
- Alan-a-Dale is absent from The Adventures of Robin Hood (1938) but is merged with the character Will Scarlet portrayed by Patric Knowles.
- Alan-a-Dale was played by Leslie Denison in The Bandit of Sherwood Forest (1946).
- Alan-a-Dale was played by Lester Matthews in Rogues of Sherwood Forest (1950).
- Alan-a-Dale is played by Elton Hayes in the 1952 film The Story of Robin Hood and His Merrie Men.
- Alan-a-Dale was played by John Schlesinger in two episodes of Robin Hood (1956).
- Alan Dale is the main character in Angus Donald's novels Outlaw, Holy Warrior and King's Man.
- Alan-a-Dale was played by Elric Hooper in Lionel Bart's ill-fated musical, Twang!! (1965). The show was revived in 2018 at the Union Theatre, London, with James Hudson in the role.
- Alan A 'Dale was the subject of a comic song performed on Dudley Moore and Peter Cook's show, Not Only But Also in 1965. The lyrics consisted of little more than a repetition of his name. Along with Cook and Moore, the performers were Joe Melia, Bill Wallis and John Wells.
- He was played by Bing Crosby in the rat pack film Robin and the 7 Hoods.
- Robert O. Cornthwaite played Allan A. Dale, an accomplice to the supervillain The Archer, in season 2 of Batman ("Shoot a Crooked Arrow" and "Walk the Straight and Narrow", 1966)
- Alan-a-Dale was a character in the Canadian animated series Rocket Robin Hood (1966-1969). Described as Rocket Robin Hood's "right hand man," he enjoyed playing pranks and often found solutions to save the day, such as recognizing the rhythm of Morse code, a reference to the character's past as a minstrel.
- Alan-a-Dale is the musical narrator of Disney's 1973 animated Robin Hood film. He is depicted as a lute-playing rooster voiced by country singer Roger Miller and played the role of both narrator and minor ally to Robin Hood and Little John. The songs are "Whistle Stop", "Oo-De-Lally", and "Not in Nottingham".
- He was played by Bernie Kopell in the 1975 US television series When Things Were Rotten
- He was played by Peter Hutchinson in the 1984 British television series Robin of Sherwood, appearing in the fifth episode, entitled "Alan A Dale". In this version, Alan's sweetheart is named Mildred and is to be married to the Sheriff of Nottingham. Friar Tuck weds Alan and Mildred.
- In the animated series Young Robin Hood, Alan-a-Dale (Voiced by Michael O'Reilly) is a very young, romantic minstrel and good friend of Robin.
- In the 2002 video game Robin Hood: The Legend of Sherwood, Allan appears briefly to disguise himself as Prince John's man Guillame de Longchamps to deliver the ransom to save King Richard.
- LeVar Burton's character Geordi La Forge was cast as Alan-a-Dale in a Robin Hood fantasy episode of Star Trek: The Next Generation.
- Allan A Dale is played by Joe Armstrong in the 2006 BBC production of Robin Hood. Here he is portrayed as an expert pickpocket and a compulsive liar with a sarcastic nature and no musical ability, but at the same time is a skilled swordsman and fighter. After being charged and sentenced to death for hunting a deer in the King's forest, Allan is one of four people rescued by Robin in his first demonstration of defiance against the Sheriff of Nottingham. Upon their escape, Allan joins Robin's band of outlaws and helps them aid the poor. After being captured by Gisborne he sells him information. When Robin finds out that he has turned traitor, Allan goes to work for Gisborne, but he later reconciles with Robin and returns to the band of outlaws and tries to help them defeat the Sheriff of Nottingham.
- Alan Doyle of the band Great Big Sea is cast as Alan-a-Dale in the Ridley Scott production of Robin Hood starring Russell Crowe and Cate Blanchett, released in 2010. He is a war veteran who goes home with Robin Longstride and seems to have some musical talent.
- In John Kander and Fredd Ebb's musical Curtains, Alan O'Dell is the name of the character who takes on the identity of Rob Hood in the show-within-a-show titled "Robbin' Hood" and is played by the character of Bobby Pepper.
- Alan-a-Dale is played by Ian Hallard in the third episode of the eighth series of the BBC1 series Doctor Who entitled "Robot of Sherwood".
