= Through a Dark Mist =

1991 novel by Marsha Canham

- 1991 cover art
- Author: Marsha Canham
- Language: English
- Genre: Historical fiction
- Publisher: Dell Publishing
- Publication date: 1991
- Publication place: Canada
- Media type: Paperback; E-book
- Pages: 480
- ISBN: 978-0440206118
- Followed by: In the Shadow of Midnight

Through a Dark Mist is a 1991 historical fiction novel by Canadian author Marsha Canham, the first instalment of her "Medieval" trilogy inspired by the Robin Hood legend set in 13th-century England. The story centers on the rivalry and enmity between two brothers each claiming to be one man – Lucien Wardieu, Baron De Gournay. The heroine, Lady Servanne de Briscourt, finds herself caught in the middle when she is betrothed to one but falls in love with the other. The novel was published by Dell Publishing in 1991.

Canham was a lover of the Robin Hood legend since viewing the interpretation seen in the Errol Flynn films. For many years she had desired to write her own version but thought it rather "brazen" to try to rework such a famous story into her own words. Canham only decided to create it after experiencing a recurring dream about a damsel in distress being rescued by two bowmen; a friend convinced her to translate the idea into a book, and after further research, she decided to make Through a Dark Mist about a new invented character who could conceivably have been the father of the famous outlaw.

== Plot summary ==
In the forests of Lincoln, England, the young widow Lady Servanne de Briscourt is journeying to marry her powerful betrothed, Lucien Wardieu, Baron de Gournay. While en route to his castle Bloodmoor Keep, Servanne's entourage is waylaid; she and her old maid are taken captive by forest outlaws led by the Black Wolf of Lincoln, a man claiming to be the true Lucien Wardieu. His associates include kindly former monk Alaric FitzAthelstan, the mischievous dwarf Sparrow, and the secretly female Gillian "Gil" Golden.

Outraged to have been taken captive, Servanne is taken to his group's hideaway inside a dilapidated abbey. She and the Black Wolf feel instant attraction to the other, though initially each tries to hide it by antagonizing the other. He explains that he and her betrothed are half-brothers; the real Lucien was the heir to their father, but was betrayed by his bastard half-brother Etienne, who left Lucien for dead and stole his identity. Lucien took years to physically recover, and entered the service of Eleanor of Aquitaine. Servanne gradually comes to believe his claim, and they consummate their relationship. Lucien plans to confront his brother, but also has a secret mission to rescue Princess Eleanor of Brittany from her uncle Prince John. A previously agreed-upon hand-off between John and Lucien's party is to occur at Bloodmoor, though no one else knows that Lucien has been posing as an outlaw.

Meanwhile, Servanne's betrothed Etienne has been posing as Lucien Wardieu for years, controlling Bloodmoor. He is a cruel man who enjoys inflicting pain almost as much as his mistress, Nicolaa de la Haye. Etienne is enraged to hear of Servanne's disappearance, as he covets her dowry of lands adjacent to his. Once they marry, Etienne plans to kill her at the jealous Nicolaa's behest. Lucien warns Servanne about his brother's cruelty but sends her back anyway, as he believes it is the safest place for her leading up to the rescue of the princess. If in need of help, he tells her to seek out the man in charge of the plan, the infamous but mysterious knight Randwulf La Seyne Sur Mer. Back at Bloodmoor, everyone is preparing for the wedding. La Seyne arrives with his entourage for the princess' exchange.

Servanne realizes Lucien's secret mission is to rescue Princess Eleanor and seeks out La Seyne, hoping to persuade the man to help Lucien avoid having to confront his brother, as she fears for his life. However, at their meeting Servanne is shocked to see that La Seyne, who normally wears a mask to hide a supposed disfigurement, has actually been Lucien. The two finally declare their love for the other. Servanne returns to her quarters intending to leave the castle, but is overheard by Etienne and Nicolaa. Having also realized that La Seyne is his brother, Etienne physically assaults Servanne and sends her to a remote prison cell in the castle. Lucien's group leaves with the princess, while he remains behind to fight Etienne in a publicly attended duel in the tournament organized to celebrate the wedding. Due to Etienne's treachery, Lucien loses and is locked away in the dungeon.

Meanwhile, Alaric, Sparrow, and the other outlaws have secretly remained in the castle; they free Lucien from his cell and set out to save Servanne. Her cell is accessible only by scaling a steep cliff edge; Lucien and Alaric disguise themselves as priests to gain access, but on their way down they realize it is a trap – Etienne knew they would try to rescue Servanne and has amassed his men to kill the whole rescue party of outlaws. The two groups fight, and Lucien's triumphs at the last second despite being outnumbered. With victory attained but unwilling to remain in a place with so many bad memories, Lucien leaves for the continent with Servanne and the rest of his group.

== Development ==
"When I began researching the actual stories attributed to Robin of Locksley, there were so many variances and discrepencies [sic] and sheer guesswork, supposition, and rumor it left all manner of doors wide open for my own interpretation of how the man...or men...developed into a legend."

— Author Marsha Canham

Before writing Through a Dark Mist, Canadian author Marsha Canham had written romantic stories in other historical periods and settings, including on 17th-century pirate ships and in Jacobite-era Scotland. In addition to writing about "tall ships and exploding cannon," the legend of Robin Hood also appealed to her. She had loved the legend since watching the film star Errol Flynn, later writing that "there is something about misty forests and outlaws, robbing from the rich to save the poor, and the sound of an arrow thunking into a tree trunk that gets my imagination stirring."

As a result, the subject had always been something Canham desired to adapt, but she thought "it was rather brazen of me to think I could retell such a familiar legend in my own voice." Nevertheless, she became inspired to write her own story after "experiencing a recurring dream since the age of twelve-a dream that involved a beautiful blonde-haired damsel in distress, held captive in a cave high on a cliff, rescued by two men cloaked in monks' robes, wielding bows and arrows." She told the dream to a friend, who persuaded her it could be a good book premise. The author began researching stories surrounding Robin of Locksley, but found that "there were so many variances and discrepencies and sheer guesswork, supposition, and rumour it left all manner of doors wide open for my own interpretation of how the man...or men...developed into a legend." Soon after, Canham wrote its prologue and decided to create a new character, the Black Wolf of Lincoln, who could "open a door to the possibility that [he] was heroic enough to have sired such a legendary hero" as Robin Hood. Through a Dark Mist became her first story set in the medieval period. She added Princess Eleanor as a character very late in the writing process, having come across her story when the novel was nearly complete.

== Release and reception ==
Through a Dark Mist was published in 1991 by Dell Publishing. It was the first installment in Canham's Medieval trilogy, the other two being In the Shadow of Midnight (1994) and The Last Arrow (1997). Jane Sullivan, writing for The Sydney Morning Herald, recommended the entire "swashbuckling" trilogy for "hopeless romantics," while Rebekah Bradford of The Post and Courier called the series an "inventive reimagining."

== See also ==
- List of historical novels
- Robin Hood in popular culture
