= Molly Holden =

British poet (1927 – 1981)

Molly Winifred Holden (7 September 1927 in London – 5 August 1981) was a British poet.

== Biography ==
Holden grew up in Surrey, and Wiltshire. She graduated from King's College London in 1951. Her maiden name was Gilbert. She was the granddaughter of the popular children's author Henry Gilbert.

She suffered from multiple sclerosis.

== Awards ==
- 1972 Cholmondeley Award

== Works ==
- A Hill Like a Horse, 1963
- Bright Cloud, 1964
- To Make Me Grieve. Chatto and Windus. 1968. ISBN 978-0-7011-1413-8.
- Air and Chill Earth. Chatto and Windus. 1971. ISBN 978-0-7011-1831-0.
- The Country Over. Chatto and Windus. 1975.
- Selected poems. Carcanet. 1987. ISBN 978-0-85635-696-4.
- Holden, Molly; English, Andy; Elsted, Crispin; Elsted, Apollonia; Elsted, Jan; Simenson, Alanna (2021). Sudden immobility. Mission, British Columbia: Barbarian Press, Mad Hatter Bookbinding Co. ISBN 978-0-920971-58-1. OCLC 1296049445.

=== Memoirs ===
- Geoffrey Hill; Molly Holden; Alfred Edward Housman (2003). Three Bromsgrove poets. Housman Society. ISBN 978-0-904579-19-2.

=== Anthologies ===
- Patricia Beer, ed. (1975). New poems: a PEN anthology of contemporary poetry. Hutchinson. ISBN 978-0-09-125530-5.
- Colin Falck; Ian Hamilton, eds. (1975). Poems since 1900: an anthology of British and American verse in the twentieth century. Macdonald and Jane's. ISBN 978-0-356-03151-4.
