= Robyn Hod and the Shryff off Notyngham =

Dramatic piece, Robin Hood tale

Robyn Hod and the Shryff off Notyngham is the manuscript fragment of a late medieval play about Robin Hood, the earliest known Robin Hood playscript and the only surviving medieval script of a Robin Hood play. The manuscript dates from c. 1475, making it approximately as old as the earliest copies of the ballads. In addition to being incomplete the script has no scene or stage directions, and does not identify speakers, so it offers uncertainties of interpretation. However it has been interpreted as telling essentially the same story as "Robin Hood and Guy of Gisborne". If correct this would confirm the medieval origin of the Gisbourne story. The play is also important for containing the earliest reference to Friar Tuck, "ffrere Tuke", as a member of Robin Hood's band.

The manuscript is preserved in the library of Trinity College, Cambridge. A number of scholars agree that it was probably originally part of the papers associated with the Paston Letters and is the Robin Hood play referred to in a 1473 letter by Sir John Paston, "presumably acted before the Paston household in the 1470s".
