= Angus Donald =

British writer of historical fiction

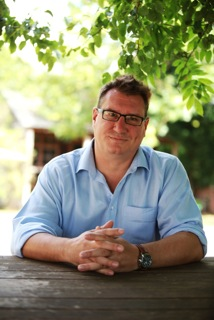
- Born: 1965 (age 60–61); China
- Education: Marlborough College; University of Edinburgh (Master of Arts)
- Occupation: Novelist
- Writing career
- Language: English
- Genre: historical fiction
- Notable work: Outlaw Chronicles series ‘Fire Born’ series
- Website: angusdonaldbooks.com

Angus Donald (born 1965 in China) is a British writer of historical fiction. As of 2020, he has released ten novels and three novellas that loosely follow the story of Alan-a-Dale.

== Biography ==
Donald's parents being British diplomats, much of his childhood was spent in various places around the world, including Greece, Hong Kong, Zaire and Indonesia. After graduating from the University of Edinburgh, Donald worked as a fruit-picker in Greece, a waiter in New York and as an "anthropologist studying magic and witchcraft" in Indonesia. He subsequently worked as a journalist in Hong Kong, New Delhi, Pakistan, Islamabad and Afghanistan before attempting to write his first novel.

== Books ==
=== The Outlaw Chronicles ===
1. Outlaw (2009)
2. Holy Warrior (2010)
3. King's Man (2011)
4. Warlord (2012)
5. Grail Knight (2013)
6. The Iron Castle (2014)
7. The King's Assassin (2015)
8. The Death of Robin Hood (2016)
9. Robin Hood and the Caliph's Gold (2020)
10. Robin Hood and the Castle of Bones (2020)

=== Holcroft Blood Novels ===
1. Blood´s Game (2017)
2. Blood´s Revolution (2018)
3. Blood´s Campaign (2019)

==== Novellas ====
- The Rise of Robin Hood (2013)
- The Betrayal of Father Tuck (2013)
- The Hostility of Hanno (2013)

==== Fire Born Series ====
- The Last Berserker (2021)
- The Saxon Wolf (2022)
- The Loki Sword (2022)
- King of the North (2023)
- Blood of the Bear (2024)
