= Holy Warrior =

2010 novel by Angus Donald

- Author: Angus Donald
- Language: English
- Series: Outlaw Chronicles
- Genre: Historical Fiction
- Publisher: Little Brown
- Publication date: 22 July 2010
- Publication place: England
- Media type: Print
- Pages: 512
- ISBN: 978-0-7515-4209-7
- Preceded by: Outlaw (2009)
- Followed by: King's Man (2011)

Holy Warrior is the second novel of the eight-part Outlaw Chronicles series by British writer of historical fiction, Angus Donald, released on 22 July 2010 through Little, Brown and Company. The novel was well received.

== Plot ==
This novel continues the story of Alan Dale, based on the character Alan-a-Dale; warrior and troubadour in Robin Hoods band of outlaws. The novel takes place during the Third Crusade, an attempt by European leaders to reconquer the Holy Land from Saladin. In the novel Robin is forced to join Richard the Lionheart on his crusade and during which learns he is the target of an assassination attempt; Alan is tasked with discovering the origins of the attack.

== Reception ==
The novel received positive acclaim from reviewers. George Williams of The Australian wrote that Donald's approach to dealing with the complex issues such as religious hatred and the general intolerance of the time "marks it as a cut above other versions of the legend" and stated that, "like Outlaw, Holy Warrior is undoubtedly one of the finest Robin Hood stories of recent times". Sarah Arrow, managing editor of Birds on the Blog, said in her review that "it's good writing, it makes good reading and it's a darn sight better than a lot of rubbish that is passed off as a book these days". In a review for Falcata Time, Gareth Wilson states that the Outlaw Chronicles are "a great series to use as a bridging gap between the Young adult and Adult market and one that will definitely become a firm fav [sic]".

== See also ==
- Outlaw (novel)
- King's Man
