= John Finnemore (born 1863) =

British writer (1863–1915)

- Born: 1863; Burnham, Buckinghamshire, England, UK
- Died: 17 December 1915 (aged 51–52); Llanfarian, Aberystwyth, Wales, UK
- Occupations: Writer, Teacher
- Spouse: Eliza Emily Pearson
- Writing career
- Language: English
- Period: 1898–1915
- Genres: Children's novels and non-fiction
- Notable work: Teddy Lester series

John Finnemore (1863–1915) was a British school teacher and writer of fictional novels and history and geography texts of countries, primarily for younger readers. Finnemore contributed stories to popular boys' magazines of his time such as The Boy's Own Paper and Boys' Realm but he is best remembered for his books about Teddy Lester and his friends at Slapton, a fictitious English public school. The stories have a strong sporting focus, with Lester excelling at rugby, cricket and other games. He also wrote a few adult novels. Finnemore was also a writer of early Boy Scout fiction.

== Biography ==
There is no existing documentation of Finnemore's life and the following account has been constructed from returns of the Census in the United Kingdom and official Birth, Marriage and Death records held at the General Register Office (GRO) for England and Wales. John was born in the third quarter of 1863 at Birmingham, England. His father, William worked in the Birmingham pen trade and his elder brother was the artist Joseph Finnemore. John's mother, Charlotte died in 1878 when he was 15 years of age and his father did not marry again. The family must have been reasonably wealthy and as a result John received a good education because at the age of 17 he was already working as a school teacher. Five years later he married Eliza Emily Pearson who was the same age as him and was also a teacher at 17. Eliza came from a Northampton family which had resettled in Birmingham before she was 7 years of age. After her marriage Eliza dropped her first name and retained her maiden surname to become Emily Pearson Finnemore. She became an author of mainly religious works published by the Christian Knowledge Society (now known as SPCK). There were no children from the marriage.

The 1881 Census shows Finnemore living at the family home at Aston, Birmingham but 10 years later he is found living with Emily at the small hamlet of Little Bealings in Suffolk where his occupation is shown as a schoolmaster. Ten years later the couple are found living in Wales in the village of Blaenpennal in Cardiganshire. The 1891 Welsh Census shows that John was a speaker of the Welsh language which, no doubt, was an essential skill he had to acquire since again his occupation is shown to be a "schoolmaster and author". The biography of T. Hughes Jones (1895–1966) records the fact that Jones attended the Tan-y-garreg elementary school, Blaenpennal, where his schoolteacher until 1903 was John Finnemore. It is around this time that Finnemore's first published works start to appear. During the following ten-year period he became a prolific writer with several books published each year and during that time he must have become quite wealthy. This is evidenced by the 1911 Census showing John and Emily living together with their cook and housemaid in a 15-room house at Llanfarian, Aberystwyth some 12 miles from Blaenpennal.

Finnemore died on 17 December 1915 of heart failure aged 52. Four days later he was buried at the Anglican church of St. Llwchaearn at Llanychaearn a few miles from his home.

== Selected works ==
=== Teddy Lester Series ===
- Three School Chums (London, W. & R. Chambers, 1907)
- His First Term: A Story of Slapton School (London, W. & R. Chambers, 1909)
- Teddy Lester's Chums (London, W. & R. Chambers, 1910)
- Teddy Lester's Schooldays (London, W. & R. Chambers, 1914)
- Teddy Lester Captain of Cricket (London, W. & R. Chambers, 1916)
- Teddy Lester in the Fifth (London, W. & R. Chambers, 1921)

=== Boy Scout fiction ===
- The Wolf Patrol: A Tale of Baden-Powell's Boy Scouts (London, Adam & Charles Black, 1908)
- The Story of a Scout (London, A. & C. Black, 1909)
- The Lone Patrol (London, W. & R. Chambers, 1910)
- Brother Scouts (London, W. & R. Chambers, 1911)
- A Boy Scout in the Balkans (London, A. & C. Black, 1913)
- A Boy Scout with the Russians (London, W. & R. Chambers, 1915)

=== Other fiction ===
- Boys and Girls of Other Days (1898)
- The Red Men of the Dusk (1899)
- Two Boys in War-Time (London A. & C. Black, 1900)
- The Lover Fugitives (1901)
- In the Trenches: The Adventures of a Rifleman in the Crimea (1904)
- Children of Empire (1905)
- Jack Haydon's Quest (London, A. & C. Black, 1906)
- Black's Literary Readers (London, A. & C. Black, 1906)
- The Secret Entrance (1907)
- The Red Men of the Dusk (London A. & C. Black)
- The Bushrangers of Black Gap (London A. & C. Black)
- Jack Haydon's Quest (London A. & C. Black)
- The Story of Robin Hood (London A. & C. Black)
- The Renegade (London A. & C. Black)

=== Non-fiction ===
- Men of Renown: King Alfred to Lord Roberts (1902)
- Japan (London, A. & C. Black, 1907)
- India (London, A. & C. Black, 1910)
- Italy (London, A. & C. Black, 1907/1911)
- Switzerland
- Social Life in England (London, A. & C. Black, 1912)
- Morocco (London, A. & C. Black, 1908)
