= Green Feather Movement =

1950s American protest movement

The Green Feather Movement was a series of college protests directed against McCarthyism at the height of the Red Scare in the United States. The movement arose in response to an attempt to censor Robin Hood because of its alleged communist connotations and eventually spread to universities across the nation.

== Background ==
The Green Feather Movement came during the height of the Red Scare and McCarthyism in the United States following World War II, the establishment of Communist governments abroad, and the Great Depression, after which many were disillusioned by capitalism. Americans were especially paranoid about possibly having communists in the country, especially in the government, so alleged communists were often tried and fired. People like Senator Joseph McCarthy were able to capitalize on this widespread fear of communism to gain political power. McCarthy claimed to have the names of more than 200 communists in the state department, and he held a series of televised smear campaigns in order to rid the government of communists. However, his attempts to find communists were largely unsuccessful; he ended up accusing the US army of containing communists, leading to his downfall and irrelevance after his inquiry of the army starting in 1953.

=== Censorship ===
Censorship was an important part of the Red Scare and containment of communism in the United States. The film and music industries were especially censored, as well as literature. Writers, screenwriters, directors, etc. were often investigated and blacklisted due to claims of their alleged communist beliefs. Lawyers, social workers, and especially teachers lost their jobs for the same reason. Loyalty oaths from teachers were also required in more than 39 states to ensure that they would not teach communist-leaning lessons to students. Educational literature and literature in college curricula were especially targeted under McCarthyism due to the fear that communism will be taught to students. As a result, many famous works were censored during the 1950s, including Invisible Man by Ralph Ellison, "Civil Disobedience" by Henry David Thoreau, and The Grapes of Wrath by John Steinbeck. The newly popular genre of writing, comic books, was also especially targeted because they were seen as corrupting the minds of young people. The Senate Subcommittee on Juvenile Delinquency oversaw this problem and aimed to completely ban comic books.

=== McCarthyism ===
Senator Joseph McCarthy of Wisconsin held a series of investigations and hearings during the 1950s aimed at exposing supposed communist infiltration of various areas of the U.S. government. McCarthy gained prominence in February 1950 claiming he had a list of communists who had infiltrated the State Department. Elected chairman of the Committee on Government Operations in 1952, he proceeded to use his position on the Investigations Subcommittee to conduct a wide-ranging smear campaign. Despite investigating various departments and questioning witnesses about their suspected communist affiliations, he failed to identify any communists in the government. McCarthyism both reached its peak and began its decline when he launched an investigation into possible espionage and subversive activities at the Army Signal Corps Engineering Laboratories in Fort Monmouth, New Jersey, culminating in 36 days of televised investigative hearings in 1954. McCarthy however then switched the investigation into whether the Army had promoted a dentist who had refused to answer questions for the Loyalty Security Screening Board. The hearings reached their climax when McCarthy claimed that Joseph Welch, the Army's lawyer, had employed a man who at one time had belonged to a communist front group. Welch rebuked the senator saying, “Have you no sense of decency, sir, at long last? Have you left no sense of decency?” and discredited McCarthy and his investigation. This and the broadcast of McCarthy's tactics turned the public against him, and support for him plummeted. McCarthy was further undermined by a critical television editorial by journalist Edward R. Murrow. The Senate voted 67 to 22 in December 1954 to censure McCarthy for conduct unbecoming.

== Motivation ==
The students responsible for starting this movement were motivated not only by the Red Scare, but also by their religious faith. In an interview, Bernard Bray, one of the original five students, talked about how he and his friends attended the Roger Williams Fellowship at a local Baptist church to discuss social issues while performing vespers. The group met for Wednesday night discussion and communal Sunday night suppers led by Dr. W. Douglas Rae, church adviser, and Miss Emily Watson, faculty adviser. The purpose of the group was to promote Christian social action in the community and on campus. Bray explained the importance of these meetings by saying that “my sort of spirituality was a . . . struggle to find a way to make God’s will become a reality in my life and to that working in fellowship with others and the Roger Williams Fellowship was the ideal context for doing that.” As McCarthyism became more and more popular, the students felt a need to stand up. Bray preferred to think of the movement more as Christian work, rather than courageous activism. And it was through that faith that the five students found the strength to face potential consequences.

He was also inspired by a seminarian he knew growing up who refused to fight in World War II and was jailed as a result. The religious activism of his parents, Helen and Earl Bray, who stood up and walked out of their church after someone made a racist comment about a Japanese American, also prompted his action. When asked why attempts to censor Robin Hood pushed Bray to action, he explained that the issue wasn't Robin Hood as much as “a great opportunity to find a symbol to fight McCarthyism — it was more a matter of principle.”

== The Movement ==
On November 13, 1953, Ada White of the Indiana Textbook Commission, referred to solely as Mrs. Thomas J. White in news stories of the time, proposed to ban Robin Hood from the grade school curriculum because of its supposed communist connotations. She claimed that Robin Hood embodied communist and socialist ideals because he stole from the rich and gave to the poor, saying that "there is a Communist directive in education now to stress the story of Robin Hood. They want to stress it because he robbed the rich and gave it to the poor. That’s the Communist line. It’s just a smearing of law and order and anything that disrupts law and order is their meat." Robin Hood was not banned from Indiana schools; however, Indiana Governor George Craig did say that "Communists have gone to work twisting the meaning of the Robin Hood legend." In fact, Mrs. White's push to have the subject banned had the opposite effect of what was desired.

In response to this attempt to ban Robin Hood, and the larger McCarthy witch hunt it was a part of, five students at Indiana University Bloomington — junior Bernard Bray, sophomore Mary Dawson, graduate student Edwin Napier, junior Blas Davila, and senior Jeanine Carter — started the Green Feather Movement. These students were Indiana natives, mostly from small towns, although the leader of the group, Blas Davis, was from the Gary-Hammond-East Chicago area. Most were liberal arts undergraduates with one graduate student in history. The students went to a local poultry farm, bought six large bags of chicken feathers, took them to the basement of a nearby house, and dyed them green to represent the one worn by Robin Hood. Then on March 1, 1954, they put one on every bulletin board on campus to protest censorship, attaching them to white buttons with slogans like "They’re your books; don’t let McCarthyism burn them". These students called themselves Robin Hood's "Merry Outlaws" and circulated anonymous protest papers against McCarthyism. Blas Davila, one of the 5 undergraduate students who came up with the plan, later became a psychology professor at the University of Indianapolis.

The reactions to the movement were mixed. Students were generally supportive, with positive comments from the student newspaper, The Indiana Daily Student, and the local television station. Some financial contributions allowed organizers to order more feathers and buttons once the first batch had been distributed. They distributed a statement of purpose, "This I Believe" with help from a printer in town, outlining their support for academic freedom and free speech while warning of the dangers that McCarthyism posed to these ideals. However, their actions were extremely radical during a time when IU freshmen and sophomore men were still required to participate in ROTC and more than 50% of the nation was in support of McCarthyism and only 29% viewed him unfavorably according to a 1954 Gallup poll. The students were investigated by the FBI and a local newspaper, eventually owning up to the deed in a letter to The Indiana Daily Student. The Bloomington Herald Telephone called the activists "dupes" and "long-hairs". However, faculty from the psychology department and the School of Law supported the movement, as did the local chapter of the American Civil Liberties Union. Even though some faculty refused to comment on the movement because of fear of retribution, the psychology department lent some support by providing some administrative protection. Attempts by Green Feathers organizers to bring Sen. J. William Fulbright, a prominent critic of Sen. McCarthy, to campus were rejected by administrators who told them that only university-approved organizations could use campus facilities for political purposes, citing a 1945 policy from the board of trustees.

In May 1954, the group decided to seek official recognition as a university organization and sent a constitution to the student senate stating that they would be open to all students to promote political discussions from all points of view. Although the student senate approved the constitution, IU President Herman B. Wells denied the Green Feather Movement's request for official recognition because they were too political, and he feared that university approval would be interpreted as endorsing the group's anti-McCarthy position, again citing the 1945 policy. The IU chapter of the American Association of Universities responded to Wells with a strong statement of support for the Green Feathers movement and affirming their commitment to the role of the university in promoting open discussion of controversial political issues. After this, the students decided to switch their focus from a fight against McCarthyism to the right to protest. Shortly after the university announced their decision to reject the Green Feathers, a letter to the editor appeared in the Indiana Daily Student from the "Executive Council of the Green Feathers." A segment of the letter reads, "Indeed, we can hardly conceive of any meaningful kind of academic freedom on a campus, unless the formation of partisan groups is allowed, if not encouraged."

Even though support for McCarthyism was high, there were also many voices against this abuse of government power, with these five students being a prime example. Louise Derman-Sparks, who joined the Green Feather movement as a high schooler, said that "as a child of the McCarthy period, I was angry at the repression and also scared."

However, the movement did not last long. When students left school for the summer, their interest in the issues of free speech and academic freedom waned. Moreover, Senator McCarthy's downfall also brought down the movement. The Army-McCarthy hearings that year were televised and thousands of Americans watched the Army's attorney, Joseph Welch, publicly rebuke the Senator, who was later condemned by the U.S. Senate. When students returned to classes in the fall, the Green Feathers organizers did not resume their efforts to promote political discussions on campus. Thus the movement ended.

== Effects ==
News of the IU Green Feather Movement spread to other universities through local and college newspapers throughout the country, as well as through The Young Socialist Challenge, the bulletin of the Young People's Socialist League. The Labor Youth League (LYL), an offshoot of the Young Communist League USA, distributed small white buttons with the green feather as a symbol of solidarity. Students at other colleges would contact them to order literature, protest buttons, and feathers, and over the course of a few weeks, the protest mushroomed into a nationwide campus movement, starting with chapters in Wisconsin and Michigan and spreading around the country. Green Feather groups subsequently spread to the universities of Harvard, Michigan, Wisconsin, Illinois, Chicago, and Purdue.

=== Harvard and UCLA ===
By May 21, the Harvard Crimson was reporting that a Green Feather club had formed at Harvard and was seeking recognition in order to distribute Green Feather buttons in the dining halls. Stephen S. Willoughby, who had organized a "Joe must go" campaign to recall Senator Joseph McCarthy, led the Green Feather organization at Harvard. At the University of California, Los Angeles (UCLA), students planned to march in support of the Green Feather Movement. The march drew 500 participants; according to Maurice Isserman, the march organizers were an unlikely coalition of campus communists and Shachtmanites. Unfortunately, the pins they ordered for the march did not reach them in time. Similar to the IU group, they went to the local poultry shop to purchase feathers and dyed them green. Green feathers were spread throughout campus during the march, which featured a crier dressed as Robin Hood followed by 200 students dressed as his Merry Men chanting anti-McCarthy slogans. At end of the march, Professor Currin V. Shields gave a speech in defense of the First Amendment. Many students continued to wear the movement's pins and feathers after the initial events. The Green Feather movement even spread to Nottinghamshire, England, the traditional home of Robin Hood, and the residents there mocked the association of Robin Hood with communism. Although the Green Feather movement lasted only two semesters and came to an end after Sen. McCarthy was censured by the U.S. Senate in December, 1954, it successfully prevented the censorship of Robin Hood and served as an important challenge to the abusive power of McCarthyism and the interference of government in people's lives.

=== 1960s and beyond ===
Although the actual movement was short lived and lasted less than a year, its effects are still felt today as student activism continues to be an important way for students to let their voices be heard. The Green Feather Movement advocated for inclusion, fairness, and justice for all, based on their religious faith. These ideals would be important themes for later student activists in the 1960s and beyond. The Green Feather Movement in UCLA was said to be "a turning point in student activism on campus because this type of political performance was not sanctioned by the administration." Universities have increasingly begun to include more student activist groups following the Green Feather Movement, allowing students to have conversations about pressing issues of the day and to plan and take action. New improvements in technology have also allowed students to express their opinion through different mediums to reach a larger audience, making student activism much more prominent and common following the Green Feather Movement. The issue of censorship as seen in this movement is also one that people still face today.
