= The Merrie Men of Sherwood Forest =

Operetta by W H Birch

The Merrie Men of Sherwood Forest, or Forest Days in the Olden Time is a pastoral operetta in three acts. The words and music were written by W. H. Birch and the work was published by John Blockley of Argyll Street, London.

== Performance history ==
In 1871 it was performed in concert by the Doncaster Musical Society, and then again in 1872. A critic noted the derivative nature of the work, remarking that it was "suggestive of others". As with many of Blockley's operettas, the work could be performed free of charge.

== Roles ==
- Robin Hood (tenor)
- Marian (soprano)
- Little John (bass)
- Will Scarlet (baritone)
- Friar Tuck (bass)
- Much the Miller's son (tenor)
- Holy Palmer (bass)
- Sheriff of Nottingham (bass)
- Chorus of maidens and foresters
