= The Books of the Wode =

Series of novels by J. Tullos Hennig

- Cover art for the first novel in the series
- Greenwode; Shirewode; Winterwode; Summerwode; Wyldingwode
- Author: J. Tullos Hennig
- Language: English
- Genre: Fantasy literature; historical fantasy
- Publisher: Dreamspinner Press; Forest Path Books
- Published: 2013 (Greenwode) - 2020 (Wyldingwode)
- No. of books: 5

The Books of the Wode is a series of novels by J. Tullos Hennig which retells the myth of Robin Hood and several related legends. In Hennig's mythos, Robin Hood is a queer druid who falls in love with the son of a Norman lord; this son eventually becomes Guy of Gisbourne. In the series, Marion is Robin Hood's sister rather than his lover. The series has received praise for its re-interpretation of traditional stories through a queer and feminist lens.

== Plot ==
=== Greenwode ===
In late 12th century England, Rob lives with his parents and sister Marion in the village of Loxley. Rob travels through the Shire Wode forest on an errand from his father. He rescues Gamelyn Boundys, the youngest son of the local Norman lord, who has been injured after being thrown from his horse.

In the weeks that follow, Gamelyn and Marion become good friends, while Gamelyn and Rob become rivals. Unbeknownst to their Christian rulers, Rob’s parents are a pagan priest and priestess. Despite the suppression of their traditional beliefs, they are training Rob and Marion to become the new incarnations of the Horned God and the Lady. Cernun, an elderly druid, prophesies that Rob will lead a final conflict between the old religion and the new, and also that Gamelyn will be Rob’s enemy. Rob rejects this; he asks the Horned God to make him Gamelyn’s lover instead of his rival. Gamelyn and Rob eventually begin a romantic and sexual relationship, despite the Church’s prohibition on same-sex relationships. Marion, Rob, and Gamelyn begin to take on symbolic roles within the pagan religion (Note: Throughout the series, Rob and Gamelyn are referred to as the Holly King and Oak King, while Marion is compared to Ivy. They also are referred to as the Hunter, Knight, and Maiden.) and begin hearing the voices of the Horned God and the Lady.

Torn between his love for Rob and his religion, Gamelyn reveals the secrets of Loxley to the Normans. This inadvertently leads to an attack on the village during Beltane. The major perpetrators are Gamelyn’s cousin Abbess Elizabeth and his elder brother Johan. Gamelyn tries to stop the slaughter, but is unsuccessful. Loxley is burned to the ground. Many peasants, including Rob’s parents, are killed. Marion and Rob are both seriously wounded, but the Celtic gods intervene and prevent them from dying. An injured Rob is rescued by Cernun.

=== Shirewode ===
After the massacre at Loxley, Cernun saves Rob’s life. Meanwhile, an injured Marion is rescued by a group of nuns including Abbess Elizabeth. Gamelyn is sent to join the Knights Templar on the Third Crusade. He takes on the name Guy de Gisbourne and does not return to England for several years.

Rob leads a band of outlaws which includes Will Scathelocke, Gilbert, and Rob’s sometimes-lover John. Rob wears a distinctive cowl, earning the nickname Robyn Hood among the local peasants. They waylay several nobles, including Johan Boundys. Rob sets a geas upon Johan, promising that Johan’s mother’s blood will cause his death. Robyn Hood and his men return to Loxley, where Cernun dies.

Brian de Lisle, Sheriff of Nottingham, is the brother of Abbess Elizabeth. He hires Guy to kill the new outlaw. Guy meets Marion, now a novice in service to Elizabeth. Due to the injuries she sustained at Loxley, she does not recognize him. Guy and his companion Much begin to track Robyn Hood. On Samhain, pagans gather to celebrate their traditional rites. Guy attempts to infiltrate their ritual, but is discovered. Guy escapes and is rescued by Brother Dolfin, a Christian priest and former confessor to the Boundys family. The Lady speaks to Marion, who regains her memories. She attempts to kill Elizabeth. Much stops her, but promises that Guy will help save her. Marion is arrested and imprisoned.

Guy confronts Robyn Hood at Mam Tor. He cuts Robyn’s hood away and realizes that the outlaw is his former lover. The two men fight, and Guy reveals that Marion is alive. Robyn and his men take Guy prisoner. Rob cuts Guy free of his bonds and they make love, but their relationship remains conflicted. They learn that Count John is hosting an archery tourney at Nottingham Castle. Marion has been convicted of witchcraft and will be burned at the stake at the tourney’s conclusion. Guy, Rob, and the bandits hatch a plan to free Marion.

Guy brings the body of a local peasant to Nottingham, proclaiming it to be the corpse of Robyn Hood. Johan, having seen the real Robyn Hood, reveals Guy’s deception. Much and Marion escape. Guy is captured and brought before Count John, who declares that he will be burned in Marion’s place.

Rob, Dolfin (nicknamed Brother Tuck by Robyn's men), and their companions return to Nottingham. Rob enters the tournament and wins; he asks Count John for Guy’s freedom. Count John offers Guy a trial by combat against Johan. Rob invokes his geas, assisting Guy in killing Johan. Elizabeth is enraged at Guy’s imminent escape and shoots him with a crossbow; Marion kills her with an arrow. In his role as vessel to the Horned God, Rob summons the Wild Hunt, killing many soldiers. Rob and Marion escape with a wounded Guy, who is healed by the Horned God and the Lady.

Much and the Templars arrive at Nottingham. Guy's master Hubert discusses the future with Guy, Robyn Hood, and Marion.

=== Winterwode ===
Rob, Marion, and Gamelyn return to the Shire Wode. They become part of the Celtic Ceugant, a trinity which stands in contrast to the Christian Church and English Crown. Eventually, they are conscripted to aid the Queen in her quest to return Richard I to England.

=== Summerwode ===
Gamelyn is tasked by his Templar masters to uncover druidic secrets and return them to his brotherhood. He is drawn between his loyalty to the organization and his love for Rob and Marion.

=== Wyldingwode ===
Rob has disappeared. Gamelyn plays a dangerous game of loyalty by double-crossing his Templar masters. Marion, now the lady of Tickhill, must help him bring back Rob.

== Reception ==
Book 1

Heather Domin of the Historical Novel Society called Greenwode a "daring" reimagining of the Robin Hood story, praising its exploration of the conflicts between "old versus new, pagan versus Christian, Briton versus Norman, duty versus desire." Domin recommended the novel "not just for fans of LGBT romance, but all readers of historical fantasy and epic adventure."

In a review for Amazing Stories, Ricky L. Brown states that Greenwode goes beyond the traditional class conflict of the original Robin Hood myth, instead delving into the "religious ideologies of the period and the influence they had on the social growth (or constraint) of the region." Brown praised the portrayal of Rob and Marion as siblings, writing that this "skillfully executed approach of these two “new” characters by the author works well from the beginning, adding to the emotional development of the duo."

Book 2

Publishers Weekly called Shirewode a "strong second installment" and praised its reinvention of "the legend of Robin Hood through a lens of religious conflict and gay romance." The review concludes that the second novel is "thick with conflict and intrigue ... a fresh, earthy tale of human passions twisted by politics and ancient powers."

Ann Chamberlin of the Historical Novel Society praised Hennig's writing, stating that the "prose is poetic, powerful, insightful. Hennig has a masterful command of weaponry and battle-speak, as well of wode magic." Chamberlin found that the Yorkshire dialect was well-written but "probably anachronistic" as well as some "poor editorial choices." Despite this, Chamberlin concluded that the novel was "a soul-plumbing, life-changing experience."

Book 3

Ricky L. Brown praised the "more epic feel" of the third novel. Brown further wrote that "All three books seem to stumble on occasion as detailed descriptions of religion sometimes cloud the development of the characters. But it is through these deep-rooted characters that readers will get a better grasp of the social conflicts the author is drawing from, so trekking through the occasional lull is well worth the effort."

Ann Chamberlin of the Historical Novel Society wrote that "Hennig’s prose is full of revelations, a rich, dialectical brew spiked with archaisms that seem so right." Chambers added several critiques, finding that "sometimes ... this style proves too much, obscuring the story and emotions rather than elucidating them. Several scenes ... seemed to serve little purpose."

Book 4

Susan McDuffie of the Historical Novel Society wrote that "the book is not a quick read, but the tapestry Hennig weaves is intricate and worth the interested reader’s effort." McDuffie favorably compared the complex characterization and worldbuilding to the works of George R.R. Martin.
