= Marsha Canham =

Canadian writer

- Born: November 19, 1950 (age 75); Toronto, Ontario, Canada
- Occupation: Novelist
- Spouse: Divorced
- Children: 1
- Relatives: Carolyn Parrish (sister)
- Writing career
- Pen name: Marsha M. Canham
- Language: English
- Period: 1984-present
- Genre: Historical romance
- Website: www.marshacanham.com

Marsha Canham (born November 19, 1950) is a Canadian writer of historical romance novels since 1984. She has won two Romantic Times Lifetime Achievement Awards, as well as multiple awards for individual books including Best Historical of the Year, Best Medieval of the Year, Best book of the Year, Storyteller of the Year, Best Swashbuckler of the Year.

== Biography ==
Canham was born in Toronto, Ontario, Canada, where she resides, to a policeman and a homemaker. Marsha has one son and two grandchildren. Her sister is Canadian politician Carolyn Parrish, elected Mayor of Mississauga in 2024.

In 1984, Marsha published her first historical romance, titled China Rose, and has seventeen such novels in print, including one contemporary romance. She is best known for her award-winning romance trilogies, one set in Scotland: The Pride of Lions, The Blood of Roses, and Midnight Honor. The other is set in medieval England and deals with her own interpretation of the Robin Hood legend: Through a Dark Mist, In the Shadow of Midnight, and The Last Arrow. She is currently working on the fourth book of her pirate wolf saga that began with Across A Moonlit Sea The Iron Rose and The Following Sea.

She has won two Romantic Times Lifetime Achievement Awards. plus multiple individual awards including being listed as "One of the seven best mass market fiction books of the year" by Publishers Weekly for The Iron Rose.

== Bibliography ==
=== As Marsha Canham ===
==== Single novels ====
- China Rose, 1984
- Bound by the Heart, 1984
- The Wind and the Sea, 1986
- Under the Desert Moon, 1992
- Straight for the Heart, 1995
- Pale Moon Rider, 1998
- Swept Away, 1999
- The Dragon Tree (previously published as My Forever Love), 2004

==== Scotland series ====
1. The Pride of Lions, 1988
2. The Blood of Roses, 1989
3. Midnight Honor, 2001

==== Robin Hood series ====
1. Through a Dark Mist, 1991
2. In the Shadow of Midnight, 1994
3. The Last Arrow, 1997
4. My Forever Love, 2003

==== Dante Pirates series ====
1. Across a Moonlit Sea, 1996
2. The Iron Rose, 2003
3. The Following Sea, 2012
4. The Far Horizon, 2017
5. ’’The Black Wind’’, 2025

==== Short stories and novellas ====
- What the Heart Sees (published in the anthology Masters of Seduction), 2011

=== As Marsha M. Canham ===
==== Single novels ====
- Dark and Dangerous, 1992
