= Henry Gilbert (author) =

English writer (1868–1937)

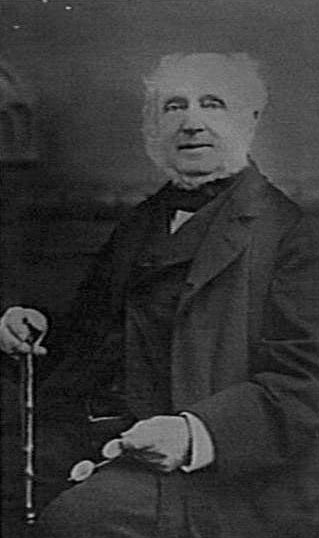
- Portrait of Henry Gilbert
- Born: 3 April 1868; London, England
- Died: 8 January 1937 (aged 68); London, England
- Occupation: Writer

Henry Gilbert (3 April 1868 – 8 January 1937) was an English writer of children's literature. He was best known for his book King Arthur's Knights: The Tales Retold for Boys and Girls (1911), which was noted for its accuracy of historical events. His book Robin Hood and the Men of the Greenwood (1912) was also well known. He was the paternal grandfather of Molly Holden. His books continue to be reprinted. His books are noted for both their historical accuracy and their style.

== Bibliography ==
- Robin Hood and the Men of the Greenwood (1912) The first significant new version on the classic Robin Hood theme, also republished as Robin Hood.
- King Arthur's knights: the tales retold for boys and girls (Stokes, 1911)
- The Book of Pirates (T, Y. Crowell & Co.)
- Pirates: True Tales of Notorious Buccaneers
- The conquerors of Peru: Retold from Prescott's "Conquest of Peru"
- The conquerors of Mexico: Retold from Prescott's "Conquest of Mexico"
