= King's Man =

Book by Angus Donald

- Author: Angus Donald
- Language: English
- Series: Outlaw Chronicles
- Genre: Historical Fiction
- Publisher: Little Brown
- Publication date: 21 July 2011
- Publication place: England
- Media type: Print
- Pages: 448
- ISBN: 978-1-84744-491-2
- Preceded by: Holy Warrior (2010)
- Followed by: Warlord (2012)

King's Man is the third novel of the eight-part Outlaw Chronicles series by British writer of historical fiction Angus Donald, released on 21 July 2011 through Little, Brown and Company.

== Plot summary ==
This novel continues the story of Alan Dale, based on the character Alan-a-Dale; warrior and troubadour in Robin Hood's band of outlaws. In the first part of the novel, Robin rescues Alan's sweetheart from an unwanted marriage to an old knight. They stop the bishop from proceeding with the ceremony, and Robin Hood, dressed in the bishop's robes, marries Alan to his bride. This gives way to the novel's main concern: the capture and ransom of Richard the Lionheart; (loosely based on the actual events). During his captivity Richard is driven to compose the song "Ja nus hons pris" or "Ja nuls om pres" ("No man who is imprisoned"), which is addressed to his half-sister Marie de Champagne. The song expresses his feelings of abandonment by his people and his sister. However, this sorrow is resolved when Alan Dale spearheads a valiant and effort to release the king.

== Reception ==
The novel has received some praise. Gareth Wilson, of Falcata Time states that the book is "beautifully written" and also notes it is "classy storytelling style spartanesque prose, [sic] cracking overall arc which when blended with his own writing style really generates something special". Author Giles Kristian, writing for on-line book database Love Reading, stated that the novel is "A fresh, lively and welcome take on one of the world's most famous outlaws" and that it "stirred in me a nostalgia for all the great stories of my childhood; those that thrilled me, inspired me and shaped who I am today". Additionally, The Times stated that the novel is "A glorious, gritty, violent, fast-moving recreation of an English legend".
