= Allan Quatermain =

Fictional character

- Allan Quatermain character
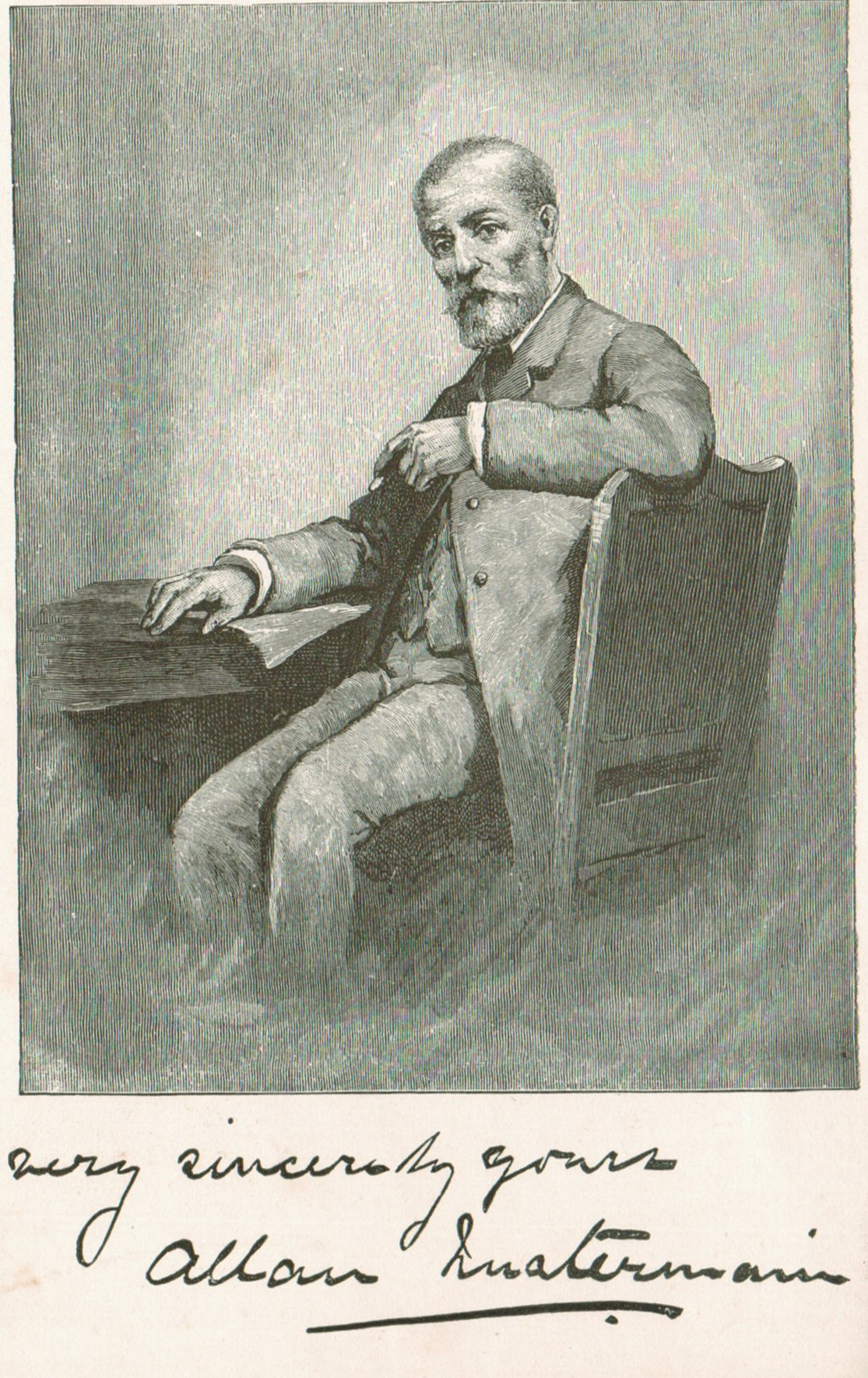
- Quatermain depicted by Charles H. M. Kerr in the frontispiece to Allan Quatermain (1887)
- Created by: Sir H. Rider Haggard

In-universe information
- Aliases: Macumazahn, Macumazana, Hunter Quatermain, Shabaka, Wi
- Species: Human
- Gender: Male
- Occupation: Professional hunter
- Spouses: Marie Marais, Stella Carson
- Children: Harry Quatermain
- Nationality: British

Allan Quatermain is the protagonist of H. Rider Haggard's 1885 novel King Solomon's Mines, its one sequel Allan Quatermain (1887), twelve prequel novels and four prequel short stories, totalling eighteen works. An English professional big game hunter and adventurer, in film and television he has been portrayed by Richard Chamberlain, Sean Connery, Cedric Hardwicke, Patrick Swayze and Stewart Granger among others.

== History ==
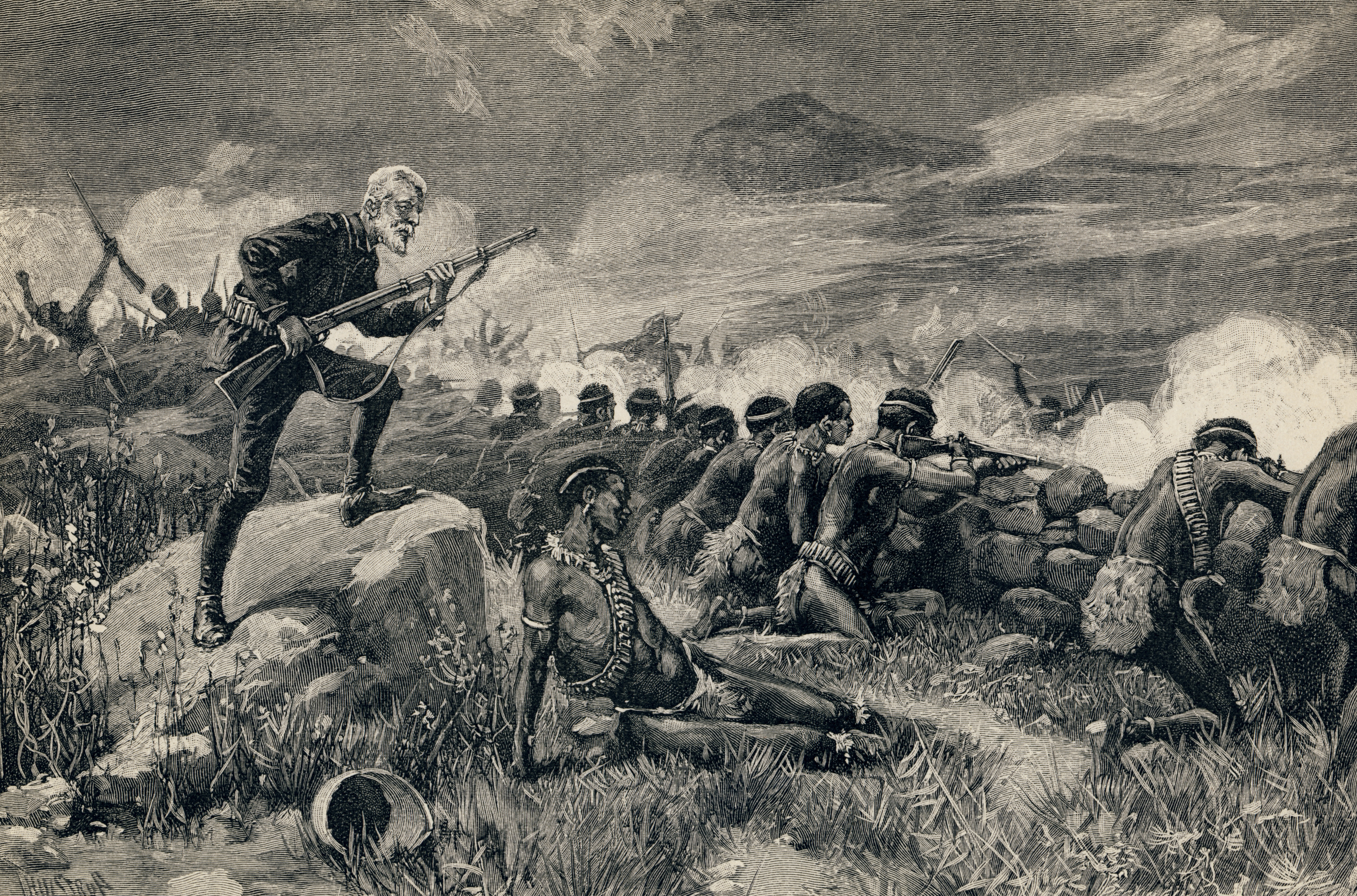
Allan Quatermain, having waited until the last minute, orders his men to fire in this illustration by Thure de Thulstrup from Maiwa's Revenge (1888)

The character Quatermain is an English-born professional big game hunter and occasional trader living in South Africa. An outdoorsman who finds English cities and climate unbearable, he prefers to spend most of his life in Africa, where he grew up under the care of his widower father, a Christian missionary.

In the earliest novels, native Africans refer to Quatermain as Macumazahn, meaning "Watcher-by-Night," a reference to his nocturnal habits and keen instincts. In later novels, Macumazahn is said to be a short form of Macumazana, meaning "One who stands out." Quatermain is frequently accompanied by his native servant, the Hottentot Hans, a wise and caring family retainer from his youth. His sarcastic comments offer a sharp critique of European conventions. Though Hans is identified as a “Hottentot” throughout his appearances in six Quatermain novels, "Hottentot" is now considered an offensive and outdated term; "Khoisan" is the preferred term. In his final adventures, Quatermain is joined by two British companions, Sir Henry Curtis and Captain John Good of the Royal Navy, and by his Zulu friend Umslopogaas.

=== Appearance and character ===
The series spans 50 years of Quatermain's life, from 18 to 68; at the start of the foundation novel King Solomon's Mines he has just turned 55, giving him a birthdate of 1830. Physically, he is small, wiry, and unattractive, with a beard and short hair that sticks up. His one skill is his marksmanship, where he has no equal. Quatermain is aware that as a professional hunter, he has helped to destroy his beloved wild free places of Africa. In old age he hunts without pleasure, having no other means of making a living, aside from trading.

About Quatermain's family, little is written. He lives at Durban, in Natal, South Africa. He marries twice, but is quickly widowed both times. He entrusts the printing of memoirs in the series to his son Harry, whose death he mourns in the opening of the novel Allan Quatermain. Harry Quatermain is a medical student who dies of smallpox while working in a hospital. Haggard did not write the Quatermain novels in chronological order, and made errors with some details. Quatermain's birth, age at the time of his marriages, and age at the time of his death cannot be reconciled to the apparent date of Harry's birth and age at death.

== Series ==
=== Composition ===
Haggard wrote fourteen novels and four short stories featuring Quatermain, beginning with King Solomon's Mines (1885). From 1885 to 1889 he wrote four of the novels and three of the short stories, including King Solomon's Mines and its sequel Allan Quatermain (1887). Haggard wrote this sequel in the summer of 1885, immediately after producing King Solomon's Mines, but Allan Quatermain was only published two years later in 1887. The other Quatermain stories from this period are "Hunter Quatermain's Story" (1885), "Long Odds" (1886), "A Tale of Three Lions" (1887), Maiwa's Revenge (1888), and Allan's Wife and Other Tales (1889). The latter book collected the previous short stories as well as a new novelette. After the publication of Allan's Wife, Haggard abandoned the Quatermain series for two decades. Then, from around April to August 1909, Haggard wrote Child of Storm, originally intending it to be a stand-alone Quatermain novel. However, during or after its composition, Haggard decided to make Child of Storm the second part of a trilogy of new Quatermain books, beginning with Marie, published in 1912. Marie was the first new Quatermain story for twenty-three years. It was followed by a short story, "Magepa the Buck" (1912), and then by Child of Storm (1913), published four years after its composition in mid-1909. Haggard continued to write more Quatermain stories until his death in 1925; the final two books in the series, The Treasure of the Lake (1926) and Allan and the Ice-Gods (1927), were published posthumously.

=== Subdivisions ===
Although some of Haggard's Quatermain novels stand alone, there are a few important sub-series. In the Zulu trilogy, Marie (1912), Child of Storm (1913), and Finished (1917), Quatermain becomes ensnared in the vengeance of Zikali, the dwarf wizard known as "the-thing-that-should-never-have-been-born" and "Opener-of-Roads." Zikali plots and finally achieves the overthrow of the Zulu royal House of Senzangakona, founded by Chaka and ending under Cetewayo (Cetshwayo kaMpande) (Haggard's spelling of Zulu names is used in the first instance, with the currently used versions in brackets).

These novels are prequels to the foundation pair, King Solomon's Mines (1885) and Allan Quatermain (1887), which describe Quatermain's discovery of vast wealth, his discontent with a life of ease, and his return to Africa following the death of his son Harry.

The Holy Flower (1915) paved the way for a trilogy of Quatermain books involving the Taduki drug, which induces clairvoyance and visions: The Ivory Child (1916), The Ancient Allan (1920), and Allan and the Ice-Gods (1927). The latter two books involve Quatermain experiencing his past lives through the use of Taduki.

With She and Allan (1921), Haggard engineered a crossover between his two most popular series, uniting Quatermain with Ayesha, the central character of his hugely successful She novels, and bringing in several other key characters from each series—Hans, Umslopogaas, and Zikali from the Quatermain series, and Billali, Ayesha's faithful minister. This book formed the third part of the "She" trilogy, although in chronological terms, it necessarily served as a prequel to the first two "She" books, since Allan Quatermain's meeting with Ayesha in She and Allan is implied to be before the discovery of Kôr by Ludwig Horace Holly and Leo Vincey as narrated in She, the first Ayesha book.

=== Summaries of the stories ===
King Solomon's Mines (1885)

A sixty-year-old Allan Quatermain travels with two fellow Englishmen (Sir Henry Curtis and Captain John Good) through a remote region of southern Africa with the aim of locating Curtis' missing brother and the lost diamond mines of King Solomon. They cross plains, deserts and mountain ranges on their quest. Quatermain, Curtis and Good reach the lost kingdom of Kukuanaland, inhabited by a warlike race related to the Zulus, and find themselves involved in a bloody struggle for the Kukuana throne.

"Hunter Quatermain's Story" (1885)

At a dinner-party in Yorkshire, Quatermain recounts a memorable encounter with a buffalo he once had on a South African hunting expedition. The short story features Sir Henry Curtis and Captain John Good as minor characters. It also includes a character called the Hottentot Hans, but this is not the same Hottentot Hans who appeared in Marie (1912) and its sequels.

"Long Odds" (1886)

Quatermain describes how a lion mauled his leg on a hunting expedition. This event is referenced in King Solomon's Mines and other stories several times.

Allan Quatermain: An Account of His Further Adventures and Discoveries in Company with Sir Henry Curtis, Bart., Commander John Good, R.N., and One Umslopogaas (1887)

Three years after the events of King Solomon's Mines, Quatermain, Curtis and Good return to Africa to locate a "great white race" hidden in the heart of the Dark Continent. They travel with Umslopogaas, the mighty Zulu warrior, and find the lost world of Zu-Vendis, inhabited by a race of sun-worshippers possibly descended from ancient Persians or Phoenicians. Chronologically this is the last of the Quatermain stories, although it was published early on; Haggard did not write the stories in chronological order.

"A Tale of Three Lions" (1887)

In the third of the four Allan Quatermain short stories, Quatermain and his son Harry prospect for gold and seek revenge for their faithful servant Jim-Jim after he is killed by a lion.

Maiwa's Revenge; or, The War of the Little Hand (1888)

Quatermain aids the African queen Maiwa in a war of vengeance after her infant son is murdered.

Allan's Wife (1889)

This novella tells the story of Allan Quatermain's youth in Africa, and of his marriage to Stella Carson. The story involves Quatermain's father, as well as the Zulu character Indaba-zimbi and the evil baboon-woman Hendrika. Hendrika is conjectured to have influenced Rudyard Kipling's Mowgli and Edgar Rice Burroughs' Tarzan. While this is speculation, Kipling acknowledged that Haggard's Nada the Lily (1892) was vital in his creation of Mowgli.

Marie: An Episode in the Life of the Late Allan Quatermain (1912)

After a twenty-three-year hiatus during which no new Quatermain stories were published, the hunter returned in Marie, which describes his love for Marie Marais, a Boer woman, as well as his involvement in events in Zulu history. Marie was the first book in the Zulu Trilogy and introduced the Hottentot Hans, who was Quatermain's companion in five further books: The Holy Flower (1915), The Ivory Child (1916), She and Allan (1921), Heu-Heu; or, The Monster (1924), and The Treasure of the Lake (1926).

"Magepa the Buck" (1912)

In the final short story, Quatermain recounts the bravery of the titular Zulu character, who undertook an admirable feat of endurance to save the life of a child. "Magepa the Buck" was collected in the 1921 Haggard book Smith and the Pharaohs.

Child of Storm (1913)

In this book, the sequel to Marie and second volume in the Zulu Trilogy, Allan Quatermain becomes involved in the political rivalries between the Zulu princes. The book introduced Zikali, the Zulu dwarf-wizard first mentioned in Marie.

The Holy Flower (1915)

Quatermain and Hans travel with the Zulu Mavovo and the young British collector Stephen Somers in quest of a giant orchid worshipped by a lost race called the Pongo. The book involves battles with Arab slave-traders, cannibalism, occultism, and a huge gorilla-god.

The Ivory Child (1916)

In the sequel to The Holy Flower, Allan Quatermain meets Lord George Ragnall and his beautiful fiancée, Luna Holmes, but the latter is kidnapped by the wizard Harût while in Egypt. Quatermain, Hans, Ragnall and his servant Savage reach the lost world of Kendahland, Harût's homeland, to rescue Lady Ragnall. The two Kendah tribes are at war, as one faction worships "the Child," an idol representing the Egyptian god Horus, and the other faction sacrifices to Jana, a giant prehistoric elephant or god who Harût says is the same entity as the Egyptian Set and the Abrahamic Satan. The Ivory Child is the first book in the series to involve the Taduki drug, a mystical herb which induces clairvoyant visions. (Robert E. Howard, who admired Haggard's work, later referenced this drug in one of his own early fragments.)

Finished (1917)

In the final part of the Zulu Trilogy, Zikali wreaks revenge on the royal Zulu house. The book is during the Zulu War of 1879, and includes Allan Quatermain as a fighter at Isandhlwana.

The Ancient Allan (1920)

In the sequel to The Ivory Child, Allan Quatermain and Lady Luna Ragnall take the Taduki drug and witness previous incarnations of themselves as well as of other characters from the series (the Hottentot Hans, Lord Ragnall, Harût and Jana) in Egypt under Achaemenid Persian rule. Along with its sequel Allan and the Ice-Gods, this is the only book in the Allan Quatermain series not to be set in nineteenth century Africa.

She and Allan (1921)

Quatermain, Hans, Umslopogaas and a Scotsman by the name of Robertson travel to Kôr, where they meet Ayesha from Haggard's She (1887) and its sequel Ayesha: The Return of She (1905). The book features a gripping battle between Umslopogaas and the demon Rezu, as well as philosophical discussions between Allan and Ayesha, and a journey made by Allan and Umslopogaas to the land of the dead. Haggard wrote one more Ayesha book, Wisdom's Daughter: The Life and Love Story of She-Who-Must-Be-Obeyed (1923), but it did not feature Quatermain.

Heu-Heu; or, The Monster (1924)

In Heu-Heu, Allan and Hans encounter a grotesque cave-painting in southern Africa depicting a fiendish gorilla-monster called Heu-Heu. Zikali then sends the pair to Heuheualand, the home of Heu-Heu, to obtain a powerful drug he claims to be even stronger than Taduki, and to rescue the daughter of a lost race's chief from being sacrificed to Heu-Heu.

The Treasure of the Lake (1926)

In this posthumously published Quatermain adventure, Allan and Hans travel with a strange sorcerer called Kaneke to Mone-land. This strange lost world is located in the crater of a volcano and is inhabited by the Dabanda people (the nation to whom Kaneke himself belongs), who have attained to high mystical powers and who worship a goddess living on an island in Lake Mone. Allan and Hans meet an Englishman called John Taurus Arkle, who becomes the Chieftain of the Dabanda. While they are in Mone-land they experience many strange and frightening displays of occult powers.

Allan and the Ice-Gods: A Tale of Beginnings (1927)

In this sequel to The Ancient Allan, Quatermain again takes the Taduki drug, and witnesses his life in the last great Ice Age, when he was a chieftain called Wi. Allan and the Ice-Gods is the last Quatermain story, and Haggard's friend Rudyard Kipling helped him with the plot. It is set shortly before the events of Allan Quatermain.

=== Related works by Haggard ===
The Ayesha Series (1887 – 1923)

The Ayesha series comprises four adventure novels by Haggard: She (1887), Ayesha: The Return of She (1905), She and Allan (1921), and Wisdom's Daughter (1923). Of these only She and Allan is part of the Quatermain series, although Quatermain is mentioned in Wisdom's Daughter. (In the opening lines of that book, Ayesha refers to "one Allan, a wandering hunter of beasts and a fighting man of good blood who visited me at Kôr, though of this I said nothing to Holly or to my lord Kallikrates, now known as Leo or the Lion, because as to this Allan I held it wiser to be silent.") The books tell the story of Ayesha, a beautiful and immortal sorceress from ancient Arabia who travelled throughout the ancient world, finally concealing herself in the ruins of the city of Kôr around 339 BC. Here she killed the man she loved, Kallikrates, in a fit of jealousy, and was forced to await his reincarnation in the dim vaults and tombs of the dead city for two thousand years. The return of her lover is the premise of She and Ayesha, while the other two books are set before Kallikrates' reincarnation.

Nada the Lily (1892)

Nada the Lily is a historical fantasy and adventure romance set in Zululand and surrounding areas under the rule of two of its kings, Chaka (ruled 1816 – 1828) and Dingaan (r. 1828 – 1840). It narrates the story of the youth of Umslopogaas as told by his foster-father, the witch-doctor Mopo. Allan Quatermain is mentioned in the final pages of the book under his Zulu name, Macumazahn.

"Black Heart and White Heart: A Zulu Idyll" (1900)

The novella "Black Heart and White Heart" was collected in the book Elissa. While it bears no obvious connexion to the Quatermain series, it is set in Zululand and features similar characters.

The Ghost Kings (1908)

The Ghost Kings is set near Zululand and involves Mopo from Nada the Lily, meaning it is in the same universe as the Quatermain series.

=== Themes ===
All but two (Note: The Ancient Allan and Allan and the Ice-Gods) of the Quatermain stories are set in Africa in a period spanning the 1830s to the 1880s. Most or indeed all of the books include battles and other large-scale military engagements.

In the Quatermain stories, as in the rest of Haggard's oeuvre – he wrote fifty-eight fiction books in total, as well as several volumes of non-fiction – the action is interspersed with philosophical reflections. Quatermain frequently enters into monologues wherein he muses on many subjects, among them Africa, God, Fate, morality, and life.

In his essay "H. Rider Haggard's Character Hans the Hottentot," Thomas Kent Miller writes that "Haggard successfully made Fate a character in many of his books. It seemed to me that his stories did not come alive due to characterizations or plot developments so much as they did to turnings of Fate."

King Solomon's Mines, Allan Quatermain, The Holy Flower, The Ivory Child, She and Allan, Heu-Heu, and The Treasure of the Lake all are examples of the lost world or lost race subgenre. Although the idea of lost peoples had precedents in earlier stories such as Edgar Allan Poe's The Narrative of Arthur Gordon Pym of Nantucket (1838) and Sir Edward Bulwer-Lytton's The Coming Race (1871), the lost world tale was largely invented and popularised by Haggard. Aside from the Quatermain lost world stories, Haggard wrote several other books in the same subgenre. His other lost world-lost race romances are She (1887), The People of the Mist (1894), Heart of the World (1895), Ayesha: The Return of She (1905), Benita: An African Romance (1906), The Ghost Kings (1908), The Yellow God: An Idol of Africa (1908), Queen Sheba's Ring (1910), and When the World Shook (1919). Scores of writers followed Haggard's lost world formula, among them his friends Rudyard Kipling and Sir Arthur Conan Doyle, as well as such authors as C. J. Cutcliffe Hyne, Francis Henry Atkins, William Bury Westall, Thomas Allibone Janvier, H. G. Wells, James Francis Hogan, Ernest Favenc, William Le Queux, Francis Stevens (Gertrude Barrows Bennett), Baroness Orczy, William Hope Hodgson, Percy James Brebner, Willis George Emerson, A. Merritt, Edgar Rice Burroughs, H. Bedford-Jones, Talbot Mundy, Alpheus Hyatt Verrill, Harl Vincent, E. C. Vivian, F. Van Wyck Mason, Eric Temple Bell, S.P. Meek, James Hilton, Edmond Hamilton, Frederick Carruthers Cornell, Robert Ames Bennet, Pierre Benoit, Harold Lamb, Arthur O. Friel, T.S. Stribling, Gilbert Henry Collins, Louis Gompertz, Otis Adelbert Kline, Ray Cummings, Joseph O'Neill, Edison Marshall, Dennis Wheatley, Howard Browne, Stanton A. Coblentz, Cecil Bernard Rutley, Rex Stout, Lester Dent, Victor Rousseau Emanuel, Robert E. Howard, H.P. Lovecraft, Clark Ashton Smith, Philip José Farmer, Perley Poore Sheehan, Victor Wallace Germains, Milton Scott Michel, Henry Kuttner, Lin Carter, Louis L'amour, Donald G. Payne, Lionel Davidson, Michael Crichton, Jeremy Robinson, and other writers of adventure and fantasy fiction to this day.

Mysticism and occultism are prevalent in the Quatermain stories and other works by Haggard. They frequently take the form of metempsychosis, telepathy, elements related to Ancient Egypt and its religion, and the Zulu religion. A common theme relating to metempsychosis and reincarnation in Haggard's works is what R.D. Mullen the "recurring triangle." In Mullen's words:

The term "recurring triangle" refers to a man and two women, or two men and a woman, doomed to reenact their affair through successive reincarnations until they have achieved spiritual peace.

== Chronology of Haggard's Allan Quatermain, Ayesha, Mopo, and Umslopogaas stories ==
Dates of events in Allan Quatermain's life and Ayesha's are given as "Chronological year" (left). Dates of first publication in book form are given as "Publication year" (right).

The four Ayesha novels are marked (*). Allan Quatermain and Umslopogaas appears only in She and Allan (1921), third-published of the four and second in the Ayesha chronology.

The three Umslopogaas novels are marked (**). Ayesha appears only in She and Allan (1921), third-published of the three and second in the Umslopogaas chronology. Allan appears there and in Allan Quatermain (1887), first-published of the three and last in the Umslopogaas chronology—as in Allan's own. That story is set in 1884–1885; only Ayesha: The Return of She (1905) is set later, in 1899.

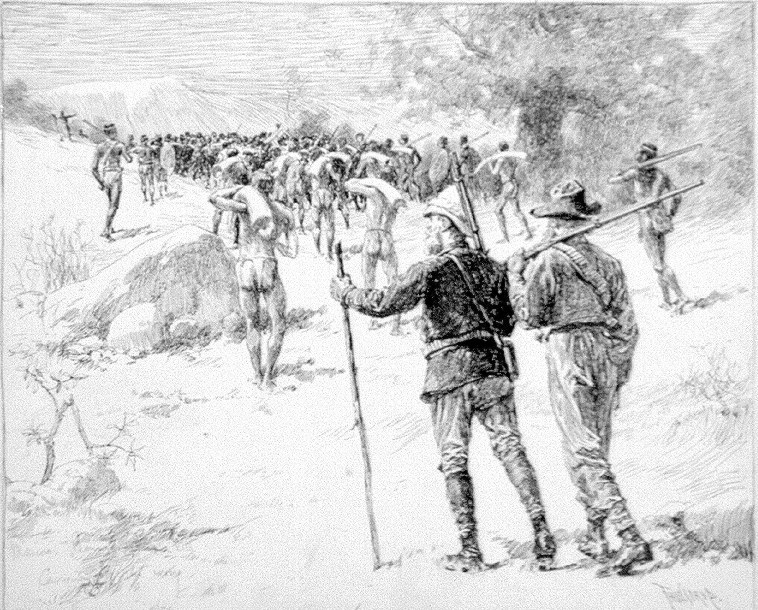
Allan Quatermain (centre) follows his men carrying a large quantity of ivory, in Maiwa's Revenge: or, The War of the Little Hand (1888) – drawing by Thure de Thulstrup

The sequence
Chronological year	Title	Publication year
c. 50000 BCE or 5000 BCE and 1883 (frame story)	Allan and the Ice-gods	1927 (Posthumous)
c. 500 BCE or 400 BCE and 1882 (frame story)	The Ancient Allan	1920
c. 380s BC – c. 330s BC and c. 1900 (frame story)	(*) Wisdom's Daughter	1923
c. 1795 – c. 1840 and 1879 (frame story)	(**) Nada the Lily	1892
c. 1830s – c. 1840	The Ghost Kings	1908
1835–1838	Marie	1912
1842–1843	"Allan's Wife", title story in the collection Allan's Wife	1889
1854–1856	Child of Storm	1913
1858	"A Tale of Three Lions", included in the collection Allan's Wife	1887
1859	Maiwa's Revenge: or, The War of the Little Hand	1888
1868	"Hunter Quatermain's Story", included in the collection Allan's Wife	1887
1869	"Long Odds", included in the collection Allan's Wife	1887
1870	The Holy Flower	1915
1871	Heu-heu: or, The Monster	1924
1872	(*)(**) She and Allan	1921
1873	The Treasure of the Lake	1926 (Posthumous)
1874	The Ivory Child	1916
1878	"Black Heart and White Heart – A Zulu Idyll", included in the collection Elissa	1896
1879	"Magepa the Buck", included in the collection Smith and the Pharaohs	1912
1879	Finished	1917
1880	King Solomon's Mines	1885
1881	(*) She: A History of Adventure	1886-87 (revised 1887, 1891, and 1896)
1884–1885	(**) Allan Quatermain	1887
1899	(*) Ayesha: The Return of She	1905

== Major characters in Haggard's Ayesha, Allan Quatermain and Umslopogaas stories ==
=== Allan Quatermain ===
Allan Quatermain is also known by his Zulu name Macumazahn or Macumazana, meaning Watcher-by-Night or He-Who-Sleeps-With-One-Eye-Open. He is the hero of eighteen works by Haggard, and is a British big game hunter who explores Southern, Central and East Africa, discovering several lost worlds there, among them Kukuanaland, Zu-Vendis, Mazituland and Pongoland, Kendahland, Kôr, Heuheualand and Walloo, and Mone-land. In the latter part of his career Quatermain takes the Taduki drug, enabling him to see visions of his past lives in prehistoric Europe, ancient Egypt and other locales.

In the first chapter of Allan Quatermain, the hunter describes himself thus:

Imagine to yourself a small, withered, yellow-faced man of sixty-three, with thin hands, large brown eyes, a head of grizzled hair cut short and standing up like a half-worn scrubbing-brush—total weight in my clothes, nine stone six—and you will get a very fair idea of Allan Quatermain, commonly called Hunter Quatermain, or by the natives "Macumazahn"—Anglicè, he who keeps a bright look-out at night, or, in vulgar English, a sharp fellow who is not to be taken in.

=== Sir Henry Curtis and Captain John Good ===
Sir Henry Curtis, Bart., and Captain John Good, R.N., are two Englishmen who accompany Allan Quatermain to Kukuanaland and the mines of Solomon, three years later journeying again with Quatermain to the land of Zu-Vendis. Curtis and Good appear in King Solomon's Mines, Allan Quatermain, Maiwa's Revenge, Allan's Wife and Other Tales, Heu-Heu, and Allan and the Ice-Gods. Curtis, whose Zulu name is Incubu, is described as being a giant of a man, while Good (known by the natives as Bougwan) is a former naval officer who wears an eye-glass and has a dry sense of humour.

In the first chapter of King Solomon's Mines, Curtis is described thus:

. . . a gentleman of about thirty, [who] was perhaps the biggest-chested and longest-armed man I ever saw. He had yellow hair, a thick yellow beard, clear-cut features, and large grey eyes set deep in his head. I never saw a finer-looking man, and somehow he reminded me of an ancient Dane.

In the same chapter, Good is described as:

. . . stout and dark . . . a lieutenant of thirty-one, who, after seventeen years' service, had been turned out of her Majesty's employ with the barren honour of a commander's rank, because it was impossible that he should be promoted . . . broad, of medium height, dark, stout, and rather a curious man to look at. He was so very neat and so very clean-shaved, and he always wore an eye-glass in his right eye. It seemed to grow there, for it had no string, and he never took it out except to wipe it.

=== Ludwig Horace Holly ===
Ludwig Horace Holly is a professor at Cambridge, born in 1841. In 1863 he adopted Leo Vincey, with whom he journeyed in East and Central Africa from 1883 to 1885, discovering the lost city of Kôr. Holly has a reputation for ugliness, and is called "Charon" by his colleagues at Cambridge, and "the Baboon" by the residents of Kôr. In 1903 Holly and Vincey discovered the city of Kaloon in Central Asia.

In the Introduction to She, Holly's appearance is detailed:

He appeared to be about forty years of age . . . he was shortish, rather bow-legged, very deep chested, and with unusually long arms. He had dark hair and small eyes, and the hair grew right down on his forehead, and his whiskers grew right up to his hair, so that there was uncommonly little of his countenance to be seen. Altogether he reminded me forcibly of a gorilla, and yet there was something very pleasing and genial about the man's eye.

=== Leo Vincey ===
Born in 1858, at five years old Leo Vincey, the son of an Englishman and a Greek woman, is adopted by Ludwig Horace Holly, who he comes to love dearly as he grows into manhood. Vincey is very handsome, with curly yellow hair, and is compared to the statue of a Greek god come to life. He is a descendant and reincarnation of the fictional Greco-Egyptian priest Kallikrates. Holly and Leo appear in two books, She (1887) and its sequel, Ayesha: The Return of She (1905).

In the Introduction to She, Haggard describes Leo Vincey:

. . . without exception, the handsomest young fellow I have ever seen. He was very tall, very broad, and had a look of power and a grace of bearing that seemed as native to him as it is to a wild stag. In addition his face was almost without flaw—a good face as well as a beautiful one, and when he lifted his hat, which he did just then to a passing lady, I saw that his head was covered with little golden curls growing close to the scalp.

=== Billali ===
Billali is a chieftain of one of the main Amahagger clans (the Amahagger being the Arabic-speaking inhabitants of Kôr, who worship Ayesha). He is a faithful servant of Ayesha, and is the kind host of Holly and Leo in She, and of Allan Quatermain in She and Allan.

In the sixth chapter of She, Holly describes seeing Billali for the first time:

He was a wonderful-looking old man, with a snowy beard, so long that the ends of it hung over the sides of the litter, and he had a hooked nose, above which flashed out a pair of eyes as keen as a snake's, while his whole countenance was instinct with a look of wise and sardonic humour impossible to describe on paper.

=== Ayesha ===
Ayesha (pronounced "Assha"), also known as Hiya or She-Who-Must-Be-Obeyed, is a woman born in Arabia in the fourth century BC. She possesses extreme beauty, and the Arab tribes fought viciously over her. She travelled throughout the ancient world, staying at one point in Greece and at another in Egypt, where she became the head priestess of the goddess Isis and acquired strong influence on the country, to the extent that she was the pharaoh in all but name. She eventually moved to the ruins of Kôr in a part of Africa "about a hundred and seventy miles" north of the Zambesi. Kôr was an ancient civilisation antedating and perhaps even founding that of Egypt. It was in the ruins of Kôr that Ayesha became the disciple of an old philosopher called Noot, who had found the secret to almost eternal life, but forbade both himself and others from exploiting this secret to gain extreme longevity. When Noot died Ayesha went to the source of life he had found, a mystical pillar of fire located in the depths of a mountain cave-system, and she bathed in its flames. She left the flames more beautiful even than she had been before, but then spent two millennia awaiting the reincarnation of Kallikrates, a priest whom she loved but killed in jealousy at the very moment she gained immortality in or around 339 BC. In Kôr she was worshipped by the Amahagger people, who inhabited the area surrounding its ruins. She wears a veil to prevent men being blinded by her beauty. Ayesha appears in a series of four novels: She (1887), Ayesha: The Return of She (1905), She and Allan (1921), and Wisdom's Daughter (1923).

In the thirteenth chapter of She, Ayesha unveils to Holly, and he describes her appearance in detail:

She lifted her white and rounded arms—never had I seen such arms before—and slowly, very slowly, withdrew some fastening beneath her hair. Then all of a sudden the long, corpse-like wrappings fell from her to the ground, and my eyes travelled up her form, now only robed in a garb of clinging white that did but serve to show its perfect and imperial shape, instinct with a life that was more than life, and with a certain serpent-like grace that was more than human. On her little feet were sandals, fastened with studs of gold. Then came ankles more perfect than ever sculptor dreamed of. About the waist her white kirtle was fastened by a double-headed snake of solid gold, above which her gracious form swelled up in lines as pure as they were lovely, till the kirtle ended on the snowy argent of her breast, whereon her arms were folded. I gazed above them at her face, and—I do not exaggerate—shrank back blinded and amazed. I have heard of the beauty of celestial beings, now I saw it; only this beauty, with all its awful loveliness and purity, was evil—at least, at the time, it struck me as evil. How am I to describe it? I cannot—simply I cannot! The man does not live whose pen could convey a sense of what I saw. I might talk of the great changing eyes of deepest, softest black, of the tinted face, of the broad and noble brow, on which the hair grew low, and delicate, straight features. But, beautiful, surpassingly beautiful as they all were, her loveliness did not lie in them. It lay rather, if it can be said to have had any fixed abiding place, in a visible majesty, in an imperial grace, in a godlike stamp of softened power, which shone upon that radiant countenance like a living halo. Never before had I guessed what beauty made sublime could be—and yet, the sublimity was a dark one—the glory was not all of heaven—though none the less was it glorious. Though the face before me was that of a young woman of certainly not more than thirty years, in perfect health, and the first flush of ripened beauty, yet it had stamped upon it a look of unutterable experience, and of deep acquaintance with grief and passion. Not even the lovely smile that crept about the dimples of her mouth could hide this shadow of sin and sorrow. It shone even in the light of the glorious eyes, it was present in the air of majesty, and it seemed to say: "Behold me, lovely as no woman was or is, undying and half-divine; memory haunts me from age to age, and passion leads me by the hand—evil have I done, and from age to age evil I shall do, and sorrow shall I know till my redemption comes."

=== Umslopogaas ===
Umslopogaas is a Zulu warrior of immense strength and physical stature, known as the bravest man in Zululand. He is the unacknowledged son of Chaka. In his youth Umslopogaas leaves Zululand and spends a time living with a wolf-pack and a man called Galazi. The two men develop a strong bond and come to call themselves brothers. Umslopogaas then becomes the chieftain of a tribe called the People of the Axe, winning the great axe of their village in fair fight. This weapon is held by Umslopogaas for the rest of his life, and is referred to variously as "the Woodpecker" (due to the way Umslopogaas uses it to poke holes in his enemies' heads) and "Inkosi-kaas" (chieftainess). When visiting the lost city of Kôr with Quatermain and Hans in She and Allan, Umslopogaas slays the demon Rezu with the axe. Umslopogaas is chief of the People of the Axe for several years, but is eventually forced to flee north, though he takes his axe with him. Umslopogaas appears in three books: Allan Quatermain (1887), Nada the Lily (1892), and She and Allan (1921).

=== Mopo ===
Mopo, also called Zweete, is a Zulu witch-doctor in the days of Chaka. He fosters Umslopogaas, the son of Chaka, as his own son to prevent him being killed by his real father, who murdered his own children to prevent any of them from living to challenge his rule. After most of his family is killed by Chaka and he is tortured by him, Mopo assassinates the Zulu king in revenge, with the help of the princes Dingaan and Umhlangana. Mopo and Umslopogaas later kill King Dingaan to avenge the death of Nada, Umslopogaas' most beloved wife. Haggard based Mopo on a real person, and the character appears in Nada the Lily (1892) and The Ghost Kings (1908).

=== The Four Zulu Kings ===
The real-life kings of the Zulus between 1816 and 1879 appear as characters in Haggard's works. Chaka is the antagonist of Nada the Lily, where he is described as "(t)he Zulu Napoleon, one of the greatest geniuses and most wicked men who ever lived. He was killed in the year 1828, having slaughtered more than a million human beings." (While many agree the number was around one million, some modern estimates place the number of people Chaka killed at something closer to two million.) In Nada the Lily, Haggard portrays Chaka as a paranoid psychopath, and was for the most part historically accurate in describing the actions of the king; for example, it is true that he killed seven thousand people after his mother died because he accused them of not showing enough grief. However, it is not true that Chaka killed his mother, as is depicted in the book. Haggard did not intend to be true to history in every detail, but his descriptions of Zulu history, culture and politics are mostly accurate. Dingaan, the second Zulu king, also appears as a character, and he too is shown to be a tyrant, though he is described as lacking the greatness which characterised Chaka. He appears in Nada the Lily and Marie. Panda, who ruled from 1840 to 1872, is described as "a man of peace," while Cetywayo appears as a character in Black Heart and White Heart, Finished, and other Quatermain adventures.

=== Amenartas ===
Amenartas is an ancient Egyptian princess with whom the priest Kallikrates fell in love. It was for Kallikrates' love of Amenartas that the jealous Ayesha killed him. Ayesha, Kallikrates and Amenartas form the most important "recurring triangle" in Haggard's work, as they repeat their affairs through different incarnations, the two women vying to win Kallikrates' affection. Amenartas appears in Ayesha: The Return of She, where she is called Atene, and in Wisdom's Daughter. In Ayesha, it is said that Amenartas was even more beautiful than Ayesha until the latter bathed in the flame of life, at which point Ayesha's beauty exceeded that of all other women who had ever lived.

=== Hans ===
The Hottentot Hans is a recurring character in the Allan Quatermain series, appearing as the hunter's friend and sidekick in Marie, The Holy Flower, The Ivory Child, She and Allan, Heu-Heu, and The Treasure of the Lake. Earlier incarnations of Hans appear in The Ancient Allan, where he is an ancient Ethiopian called Bes, and Allan and the Ice-Gods, wherein he is a caveman called Pag. Hans is described as a short and ugly individual of unknown age, though apparently old. Hans is cunning, wise, humorous and very devoted to Quatermain, who he has served since the hunter was a child; his conversations with Allan provide much wit, but also plenty of food for thought. Throughout the series, Hans appears as Allan's companion more frequently than any other character, and the relationship between the pair is imbued with emotional power. Hans is consistently portrayed as a wise and caring family retainer from Quatermain's youth and his father before him. His sarcastic comments offer a sharp critique of European conventions. Though Hans is identified as a “Hottenot” throughout his appearances in six Quatermain novels, "Hottentot" is now considered an offensive and outdated term; "Khoisan" is the preferred term. I

=== Zikali ===
Zikali is a Zulu dwarf and witch-doctor referred to as the "Thing-that-should-never-have-been-born" and the "Opener-of-Roads." He is first mentioned in Marie and appears as a character in Child of Storm, Finished, She and Allan, and Heu-Heu. Zikali is also referenced in such books as The Holy Flower and The Treasure of the Lake. He plots to bring about the fall of the royal house of the Zulus. He possesses occult powers and claims to be in touch with sorcerers throughout Africa; in She and Allan he appears to be able to communicate with Ayesha through dreams. Zikali is described as very unpleasant in appearance, resembling a huge toad. He possesses a hideous wooden charm, a carved likeness of himself called the "Great Medicine," which he claims his spirit can enter and inhabit and which protects any who wear it. The Great Medicine appears in She and Allan. It has been known and feared throughout Zululand for centuries. Umslopogaas' reaction upon seeing Allan Quatermain wearing the Great Medicine is described thus:

I [Quatermain] opened my shirt and by the clear light of the flame showed him [Umslopogaas] the image of Zikali which hung about my neck. He stared at it, though touch it he would not. Then he stood up and lifting his great axe, he saluted the image with the word "Makosi!” the salute that is given to great wizards because they are supposed to be the home of many spirits. "It is the big Medicine, the Medicine itself", he said, "that which has been known in the land since the time of Senzangacona, the father of the Zulu Royal House, and as it is said, before him".

=== Mameena ===
Mameena is a Zulu woman of exceptional beauty who is a major character in Child of Storm, and who is mentioned in several later novels, such as The Ivory Child. Desire to take her to wife causes violence among the Zulus, and she is compared to Helen of Troy.

=== Harût ===
Harût is a wizard in The Ivory Child. His tribe is the White Kendah, who worship an idol called the Ivory Child. They are at war with the Black Kendah, who worship the devil Jana. The Child requires a prophetess or oracle to speak its mind, and it is to this end that Harût kidnaps Lady Luna Ragnall, making her the oracle of the Child. An early incarnation of Harût appears in The Ancient Allan under the name of the Tanofir, an Egyptian holy man who meditates and foresees the future.

=== Lady Luna Ragnall ===
Lady Luna Ragnall (née Luna Holmes) is married to Lord George Ragnall, an aristocratic Englishman. She is mentioned in The Holy Flower but first appears in The Ivory Child. She has clairvoyant abilities, and has from childhood felt a strange connexion to Egypt. She is a reincarnation of the Lady Amada, an ancient Egyptian noblewoman. On her breast is a mark in the shape of a crescent moon, and this symbol leads Harût to take her to Kendahland. For some years she stays there as an oracle, and loses all memory of her life beforehand; but at the end of The Ivory Child her memory is brought back to her. In The Ancient Allan she and Quatermain take the Taduki drug and witness some of their previous lives. Lady Ragnall appears for the final time in Allan and the Ice-Gods.

== Publications ==
=== Books written by H. Rider Haggard ===
Sir Henry Rider Haggard, the creator of Allan Quatermain, wrote fourteen novels and four short stories featuring the character.

1. King Solomon's Mines (1885)
2. Allan Quatermain (1887)
3. Maiwa's Revenge: or, The War of the Little Hand (1888)
4. Allan's Wife and Other Tales (1889)
  1. "Allan's Wife"
  2. "Hunter Quatermain's Story"
  3. "A Tale of Three Lions"
  4. "Long Odds"
5. Marie (1912)
6. Child of Storm (1913)
7. The Holy Flower (1915) (first serialised in the Windsor Magazine, December 1913 – November 1914)
8. The Ivory Child (1916)
9. Finished (1917)
10. The Ancient Allan (1920)
11. She and Allan (1920)
12. Heu-Heu; or, The Monster (1924)
13. The Treasure of the Lake (1926)
14. Allan and the Ice-gods (1927)
15. Hunter Quatermain's Story: The Uncollected Adventures of Allan Quatermain (collection, 2003)
  1. "Hunter Quatermain's Story" (first published in In a Good Cause, 1885)
  2. "Long Odds" (first published in Macmillan's Magazine February 1886)
  3. "A Tale of Three Lions" (first serialized in Atalanta, October–December 1887)
  4. "Magepa the Buck" (first published in Pears' Annual, 1912)

=== Books written by Alan Moore ===
The character was used by writer Alan Moore and artist Kevin O'Neill in their comic book series The League of Extraordinary Gentlemen, adapted to film in 2003, based on the premise that he faked his death to enjoy a quiet retirement.

1. The League of Extraordinary Gentlemen, Volume One ("Allan and the Sundered Veil")
2. The League of Extraordinary Gentlemen, Volume II ("The New Traveller's Almanac")
3. The League of Extraordinary Gentlemen: Black Dossier
4. The League of Extraordinary Gentlemen, Volume III: Century

=== Other literary works ===
The Allan Quatermain character has been expanded greatly by modern writers; this use is possibly due to Haggard's works passing into the public domain, much like Sherlock Holmes.

One of the Sherlock Holmes pastiches of James Lovegrove, The Devil's Dust (2018), features both Holmes and Quatermain.

In 2005, an Allan Quatermain and Sherlock Holmes novel by Thomas Kent Miller, The Great Detective at the Crucible of Life, was published by Wildside Press. Miller followed this with Allan Quatermain at the Dawn of Time in 2013. These two books were collected, along with Miller's The Great Detective on the Roof of the World (which features Ludwig Horace Holly and Leo Vincey from Haggard's Ayesha stories), in an omnibus entitled Sherlock Holmes in the Fullness of Time.

Philip José Farmer and Christopher Paul Carey used elements from Haggard's Allan Quatermain and Ayesha stories in their Khokarsa series of prehistoric adventure novels, which link Edgar Rice Burroughs' Opar to Haggard's Kôr and Zu-Vendis and envision Africa in 10,000 BC. The Khokarsa stories include characters from Allan and the Ice-Gods and feature the Axe which Umslopogaas wielded in Haggard's works. In the works of Farmer and Carey, the Axe is wielded by the character Kwasin.

In 1976, Farmer was interviewed by David Pringle and said of his Khokarsa series:

"My Oparian civilization is not founded just on elements from Burroughs. It represents an amalgamation between Burroughs and Haggard. This huge axe-head made from meteorite iron actually first appeared in Haggard's Allan and the Ice-Gods. There are two characters in the first novel, Hadon of Ancient Opar, who appeared in Haggard's book, Lalila and the dwarf Paga – or Pag, as he was called in Haggard's novel. Now the hero of Haggard's novel has died in my novel; he gave the axe to Pag, who in turn has given it to Kwasin. Kwasin will have this huge axe through the series, and eventually it will go to Hadon's son, who, after the great catastrophe, will emigrate to the south and found the city of Kôr which appeared in Haggard's She. And this axe, if you're familiar with the Allan Quatermain novels, later on fell into the hands of Umslopogaas, the great Zulu hero, who shattered it in the city of Zu-Vendis, you remember. So... I'm tracing the history of this axe from Haggard to Burroughs and back to Haggard; and I'm incorporating Haggard's lost cities into Burroughs's lost cities."

== In film and television ==
The Allan Quatermain character has appeared in the following film and television works:

- Allan Quatermain (1919), a silent film starring Albert Lawrence, believed to be lost
- King Solomon's Mines (1937), a British film starring Cedric Hardwicke
- King Solomon's Mines (1950), an American film starring Stewart Granger
- King Solomon's Treasure (1979), a British-Canadian low-budget film starring John Colicos
- King Solomon's Mines (1985), an American film starring Richard Chamberlain
- Allan Quatermain and the Lost City of Gold, a 1986 sequel again starring Chamberlain
- King Solomon's Mines (1986), an Australian animated film, with Quatermain voiced by Arthur Dignam
- High Adventure (2001), a Canadian/British/Italian/Bulgarian film starring Thomas Ian Griffith as Quatermain's grandson, Chris
- The League of Extraordinary Gentlemen (2003), with Sean Connery as Allan Quatermain
- King Solomon's Mines (2004), an American television miniseries starring Patrick Swayze
- Allan Quatermain and the Temple of Skulls (2008), a direct-to-DVD film starring Sean Cameron Michael
- Allan Quatermain and the Spear of Destiny (2023), a British low-budget spoof-style film starring David Hardware

In addition, the 1959 film Watusi, a sequel to the 1950 film King Solomon's Mines, stars George Montgomery as Allan Quatermain's son, Harry Quatermain.

== Influences ==
The real-life adventures of Frederick Selous, the British big game hunter and explorer of Africa, have often been called the inspiration for Haggard's Allan Quatermain. However, Haggard denied that this was the case. In July 1916, he recorded in his diary an exchange between himself and his friend Theodore Roosevelt:

Allan Quatermain, [Roosevelt] said, he had always taken to be me, clothed in the body of Selous - as many others have done. I told him that he was right as to the first but not as to the second, since at the time I conceived Allan Quatermain I did not know Selous.

Haggard was influenced by other larger-than-life adventurers whom he later met in Africa, most notably American Scout Frederick Russell Burnham. He was further influenced by South Africa's vast mineral wealth and by the ruins of ancient lost civilizations being uncovered in Africa, such as Great Zimbabwe. The similarities are striking between Haggard's close friend Burnham and his Quatermain character: both were small and wiry Victorian adventurers in Africa; both sought and discovered ancient treasures and civilizations; both battled large wild animals and native peoples; both were renowned for their ability to track, even at night; and both men had similar nicknames (Quatermain, "Watcher-by-Night"; Burnham, "He-who-sees-in-the-dark").

The beliefs and views of the fictional Quatermain aped those of Haggard himself, and beliefs that were common among the 19th-century Europeans. These include conventional Victorian ideas concerning the superiority of the white race; an admiration for "warrior races," such as the Zulu; a disdain for natives corrupted by white influences; and a general contempt for Afrikaners (Boers). But in other ways Haggard's views were advanced for his times. The first chapter of King Solomon's Mines contains an express denunciation of the use of the pejorative term "nigger." Quatermain frequently encounters natives who are more brave and wise than Europeans, and women (black and white) who are smarter and emotionally stronger than men (though not necessarily as good; cf. the title character of "She"). Through the Quatermain novels and his other works, Haggard also expresses his own mysticism and interest in non-Christian concepts, particularly karma and reincarnation, though he expresses these concepts in such a way as to be compatible with the Christian faith.

== Influenced ==
Quatermain is suggested to be one of the templates for the American film character Indiana Jones. In fact, George Lucas has noted that among his templates for Indiana Jones was safari guide and big game hunter Allan Quatermain. He has also said that another important influence on the development of Indiana Jones was the Disney character Scrooge McDuck, developed by cartoonist Carl Barks, who created Scrooge in 1947 for a one-off Christmas story, and who then developed the character into a separate Uncle Scrooge comic book series. Barks unequivocally drew significantly upon Haggard (especially Allan Quatermain) for his Uncle Scrooge McDuck stories. Thus, Allan Quatermain’s influence on Indiana Jones came from bifurcated sources, directly from Haggard’s stories, and indirectly through Uncle Scrooge McDuck.

The route to King Solomon's Mines described by Haggard is also referred to in the movie The Librarian: Return to King Solomon's Mines, specifically the reference to Sheba's Breasts and Three Witches Mountain, which are geographical features mentioned by Quatermain in the novel.

In the Graham Greene novel The Heart of the Matter (1948), the main character Scobie remembers Allan Quatermain as his childhood hero.

== In popular culture ==
- The video game Deadfall Adventures explores the adventures of James Lee Quatermain, the great-grandson of Allan, in the 1930s.
- Allan Quatermain was a major character in The League of Extraordinary Gentlemen, a comic book series created by Alan Moore and Kevin O'Neill. The comics were adapted into a 2003 film of the same name starring former James Bond actor Sean Connery as Quatermain. This was Connery's final acting role before his retirement in 2006.

== Sources ==
- Allan Quatermain, from International Catalogue of Superheroes website
