= Child of Storm =

1913 novel by Henry Rider Haggard

- First US edition
- Author: H. Rider Haggard
- Language: English
- Series: Allan Quatermain Series
- Publisher: Cassell (UK); Longman, Green (US)
- Publication date: 1913
- Publication place: United Kingdom
- Media type: Print (Hardback)
- Preceded by: Allan's Wife (internal chronology); Magepa the Buck (publication order)
- Followed by: A Tale of Three Lions (internal chronology); The Holy Flower (publication order)

Child of Storm is a 1913 novel by H. Rider Haggard featuring Allan Quatermain. The plot is set in 1854-56 and concerns Quatermain hunting in Zululand and getting involved with Mameena, a beautiful African girl who causes great turmoil in the Zulu kingdom. It is the sixth novel, and the tenth story overall, in the Quatermain series.

The novel is the second in a trilogy by Haggard involving the collapse of the Zulu kingdom and featuring the dwarf Zikali. The first book is Marie, and the third, Finished.

The story takes place against the real life struggle between Cetshwayo and Umbelazi, the two sons of the Zulu king Mpande (called "Panda" in the novel). The events culminate in the Battle of Ndondakusuka (here called the "Battle of the Tugela") in 1856. Real life people such as Panda, Cetshwayo, and John Robert Dunn appear as characters.
