= Allan Quartermain =

Al(l)an Qua(r)termain(e) may refer to:

- Allan Quatermain, a fictional character, the protagonist in the novel King Solomon's Mines
  - Allan Quatermain (novel), an 1887 novel by H. Rider Haggard
- Alan Quartermaine (General Hospital), a character on the soap opera General Hospital
- Allan Quartermaine (1888–1978), British civil engineer
- Alan Quartermaine (footballer) (born 1951), Australian rules footballer who played for East Perth Football Club
- Allan Quartermain (footballer) (1913–1985), Australian rules footballer

== See also ==
- Allan Quatermain and the Lost City of Gold, a 1986 film based on the character in King Solomon's Mines and its sequels
- Allan Quatermain and the Temple of Skulls, another film based on the same character
