= The Ancient Allan =

1920 novel by H. Rider Haggard

- First edition (UK)
- Author: H. Rider Haggard
- Language: English
- Series: Allan Quatermain
- Publisher: Cassell (UK); Longman, Green (US)
- Publication date: 1920
- Publication place: United Kingdom
- Preceded by: She: A History of Adventure
- Followed by: Allan and the Ice-gods

The Ancient Allan is a novel by H. Rider Haggard. It is the fourteenth of the eighteen overall stories Haggard wrote about the hunter Allan Quatermain, and the tenth novel in the series.

== Plot ==
Though The Ancient Allan features Haggard's recurring hero Allan Quatermain, most of the plot concerns one of his past lives. In the frame story, he and Lady Ragnall (introduced in The Ivory Child) inhale Taduki, a fictional drug that induces visions of previous incarnations. Thus, Quatermain relives the experiences of ancient Egyptian aristocrat Shabaka (a descendant of the pharaoh of the same name)—alongside flashes of his earlier lives—and Ragnall those of Amada, an ancient priestess of Isis; several other characters of the Quatermain novels, such as the Hottentot Hans, Lord George Ragnall, the wizard Harût, and the elephant-god Jana, also appear under various guises. The Egypt of The Ancient Allan is under the rule of the Achaemenid Persian Empire, and much of the story is about a revolt against their domination. The Ancient Allan is set in nineteenth century England as well as ancient Persia, Egypt and Ethiopia.

== Reception ==
E. F. Bleiler stated the novel had "reasonably good adventure material in the first portion of the novel, but threadbare characterizations and Victorian ethics."

== Themes ==
The Ancient Allan, like many of Haggard's works, is an adventure story with strong fantastical elements involving metempsychosis and telepathy. Ancient Egypt and its religion as usual play the largest part in this web of occultism. It is strongly implied in The Ancient Allan (as well as in a few other Quatermain adventures, such as She and Allan) that the curse of the Egyptian goddess Isis pursues several characters throughout their successive incarnations.

The Ancient Allan also has pronounced elements of the historical romance.

It is the second book in a trilogy of Quatermain stories involving Taduki, a drug which induces clairvoyance and visions. The drug first appeared in The Ivory Child (1916), to which The Ancient Allan is a sequel, and appeared again in Allan and the Ice-Gods (1927).

== Chronology ==
The Ancient Allan is the tenth novel and the fourteenth story overall in Haggard's Allan Quatermain series. It was preceded by Finished (1917) and followed by She and Allan (1921).

The Ancient Allan is the second in a trilogy of Quatermain books involving the Taduki drug; it is a sequel to The Ivory Child (1916), while the trilogy was concluded by Allan and the Ice-Gods (1927), the eighteenth and final Quatermain story.

The events of the book occur around 1882, after Quatermain's adventures in King Solomon's Mines (1885). By this time he is over sixty years old and living comfortably in England, although he returns to Africa in the chronologically final story, Allan Quatermain (1887).
