= She Who Must Be Obeyed =

She Who Must Be Obeyed or SWMBO may refer to:

== Fictional characters ==
- the lead character in novels by H. Rider Haggard, and film adaptations
  - She: A History of Adventure, 1886
  - Ayesha (novel), 1905
  - Wisdom's Daughter, 1923
  - She (1925 film)
  - She (1935 film)
  - She (1965 film)
- Hilda Rumpole, the wife of Horace Rumpole of British TV series Rumpole of the Bailey 1978–1992
- Mrs. Williamson, in Kilmeny of the Orchard by Lucy Maud Montgomery, 1910
- Kismet, a Marvel Comics character
- Isabella, in The Red Seas comic series

== Other uses ==
- She Who Must Be Obeyed (sculpture), a 1975 sculpture by Tony Smith, in Washington, D.C.
- Kolinda Grabar-Kitarović (born 1968), Croatian politician and diplomat
- She Who Must Be Obeyed, an Eggheads game show team

== See also ==
- Wife, a woman in a marital relationship
- She Must Be Obeyed, a 2023 Nigerian TV series
