= The Treasure of the Lake =

1926 novel by H. Rider Haggard

- First edition (UK)
- Author: H. Rider Haggard
- Language: English
- Series: Allan Quatermain
- Publisher: Hutchinson & Co (UK); Doubleday Doran (US)
- Publication date: 1926
- Publication place: United Kingdom
- Preceded by: Heu-Heu; or, The Monster (publication order); She and Allan (internal chronology)
- Followed by: Allan and the Ice-Gods (publication order); The Ivory Child (internal chronology)

The Treasure of the Lake is one of the two posthumously published novels by H. Rider Haggard featuring Allan Quatermain. In publication order it is the seventeenth of the eighteen Allan Quatermain stories.

== Plot Outline ==
Allan Quatermain finds a village in the middle of the Dark Continent ruled by a huge, pale man with a strange knowledge of future events.

== Plot summary ==
Allan Quatermain, accompanied by the Hottentot Hans, is journeying through the East Coast of Africa when he encounters a village ruled by a man called Kaneke. Although the inhabitants of this village are Arabs, Kaneke is not of their race and only feigns practicing their religion. Kaneke tells Allan he is of the Dabanda people, a tribe living further inland inside the crater of an extinct volcano. Within this crater is the holy lake of Mone, and on an island in this lake dwells their prophetess or oracle, known as the Shadow, the Engoi, or Treasure of the Lake. Kaneke promises he and Allan will travel to Mone, both because Kaneke wishes to return to his homeland and because Allan wishes to see new things.

Shortly before they leave on their expedition, the Arabs ruled by Kaneke turn against him and wish to overthrow and execute him: Allan and Hans save him by night.

Allan, his two native hunters (known as Tom and Jerry), Hans, and Kaneke set off on their expedition. On the way to Mone-land Kaneke shows himself to have an uncanny power over animals, able to order even lions and elephants about. Kaneke claims many of the Dabanda possess this trait.

The lush crater in which the Dabanda live is surrounded by an arid landscape inhabited by the Abanda, the Dabanda's mortal enemies. When Allan, Hans and their companions are travelling through the land of the Abanda they find that a white man is being chased by these savage tribesmen. They rescue the man and find he is called John Taurus Arkle. Arkle is an Englishman like Allan and believes himself to be the desired husband of the Treasure of the Lake. However, it transpires that Kaneke is in fact chosen to be her husband; as the party are on the borders of Mone-land the jealous Kaneke attempts to murder Arkle. The white man triumphs in the ensuing hand-to-hand fight, making Kaneke swear on pain of death to relinquish his role as future husband of the Shadow.

The group - now lacking Tom and Jerry, who died fighting the Abanda - is welcomed into Mone-land by Kumpana, a powerful and elderly priest. The Shadow appears in public before Arkle to show that he is her chosen husband, but a raging Kaneke attacks her. Thwarted he flees Mone-land and becomes the chief of the neighbouring Abanda, planning to use his new subjects to invade Mone-land, kill Arkle, and capture the Shadow.

Meanwhile Allan and Hans become increasingly aware of the eeriness of the Dabanda people and their strange customs and powers, particularly after they spend a night in the forest surrounding the holy lake. As Allan says, the 'unearthly atmosphere' of the place 'at last got upon my nerves to such an extent that if I had stopped there much longer I believe I should have gone crazy.'

Just before the war with Kaneke commences, a giant thunderstorm erupts over the land of both the Dabanda and the Abanda. Following this, the hopelessly outnumbered Dabanda lure the Abanda army deep into the forest, where the Treasure of the Lake commands the elephants to kill all the enemy soldiers, thereby winning victory for the Dabanda.

Arkle weds the Shadow, while Allan and Hans depart to the West Coast in safety.

== Reception ==
E. F. Bleiler described The Treasure of the Lake as "a good adventure story, obviously influenced by the work of James Frazer".
