= Allan Quatermain and the Temple of Skulls =

2008 American film directed by Mark Atkins

- US DVD cover
- Directed by: Mark Atkins
- Screenplay by: David Michael Latt; Matthew Alson Thornbury
- Based on: Allan Quatermain; 1887 novel by H. Rider Haggard
- Produced by: David Michael Latt; David Rimawi; Associate: Paul Bales
- Starring: Sean Cameron Michael; Christopher Adamson; Sanaa Lathane; Daniel Bonjour; Wittly Jourdan
- Cinematography: Mark Atkins
- Edited by: Mark Atkins
- Music by: Kays Al-Atrakchi
- Production company: The Asylum
- Distributed by: The Asylum
- Release date: April 29, 2008
- Running time: 90 minutes
- Country: United States
- Languages: English; Zulu

Allan Quatermain and the Temple of Skulls is a 2008 American adventure film directed by Mark Atkins and starring Sean Cameron Michael, Christopher Adamson, Sanaa Lathane, Daniel Bonjour, and Wittly Jourdan. It was created by The Asylum. The film follows the adventures of explorer Allan Quatermain, and was filmed entirely on location in South Africa. It was released directly to DVD.

The film is a mockbuster of Indiana Jones and the Kingdom of the Crystal Skull, and while the film contains some elements similar to Crystal Skull, the film itself is a loose adaptation of the 1885 novel King Solomon's Mines by H. Rider Haggard.

== Plot ==
The adventurer Allan Quatermain has been recruited to lead a British-American expedition in search of a fabled treasure deep within unexplored Africa. Throughout the film, Quatermain must avoid hidden dangers, violent natives and other unseen traps during their quest for the treasure of the Temple of Skulls, travelling by train, river and air to reach his goal, while being pursued by rival treasure-seekers and unfriendly natives who wish to sabotage his expedition.

== Main cast ==
- Sean Cameron Michael as Allan Quatermain
- Christopher Adamson as Hartford
- Natalie Stone as Lady Anna
- Daniel Bonjour as Sir Henry
- Wittly Jourdan as Umbopa
