= King Solomon's Treasure =

- Film poster
- Directed by: Alvin Rakoff
- Screenplay by: Allan Prior; Colin Turner
- Based on: Allan Quatermain by H. Rider Haggard
- Produced by: Susan A. Lewis; Alvin Rakoff executive Harry Alan Towers
- Starring: John Colicos; David McCallum; Patrick Macnee; Britt Ekland
- Cinematography: Paul Van der Linden
- Edited by: Stan Cole
- Music by: Lew Lehman
- Production companies: Canafox; Gold Key TV; Towers of London Productions
- Distributed by: Gold Key Entertainment (US); Scotia-Barber (UK)
- Release date: 1979 (UK)
- Running time: 88 minutes
- Countries: Canada; United Kingdom
- Language: English
- Budget: CA$1,200,000

King Solomon's Treasure is a 1979 British-Canadian low-budget film based on the novels King Solomon's Mines (1885) and Allan Quatermain (1887) by H. Rider Haggard. It stars John Colicos as Allan Quatermain, as well as David McCallum, Britt Ekland, and Patrick Macnee who replaced Terry-Thomas.

== Cast ==
- David McCallum as Sir Henry Curtis
- John Colicos as Allan Quatermain
- Patrick Macnee as Captain John Good R.N.
- Britt Ekland as Queen Nyleptha
- Yvon Dufour as Alphonse
- Ken Gampu as Umslopogaas
- Wilfrid Hyde-White as Oldest Club Member
- John Quentin as Stetopatris
- Véronique Béliveau as Neva
- Sam Williams as High Priest
- Hugh Rouse as Reverend MacKenzie
- Fiona Fraser as Mrs. Mackenzie
- Camilla Hutton as Flossie
- John Boylan as Club member
- Ian De Voy as Club member

== Production ==
McCallum later said he did the film "because I got to go to Swaziland... the movie is something you'll have to see on a plane or on late night television."

== Reception ==
TV Guide had this to say about the film: "The cast of seasoned veterans (McCallum, Macnee, Ekland) contribute embarrassingly bad performances. Surprisingly, though, the photography—the film is shot on location in Africa as well as in London and Canadian studios—is not bad at all."

A 1979 article said the film "never saw the light of day".
