= Allan's Wife and Other Tales =

Book by Henry Rider Haggard

- First edition
- Author: Sir H. Rider Haggard
- Illustrator: Charles Kerr, Maurice Greiffenhagen
- Language: English
- Series: Allan Quatermain Series
- Genre: Adventure fiction
- Publisher: Spencer Blackett
- Publication date: 1889
- Publication place: United Kingdom
- Media type: Print (Hardback)
- Pages: 240 p.
- Preceded by: The Ghost Kings (internal chronology); Maiwa's Revenge (publication order)
- Followed by: Child of Storm (internal chronology); Nada the Lily (publication order)

Allan's Wife and Other Tales is a collection of Allan Quatermain stories by H. Rider Haggard, first published in London by Spencer Blackett in December 1889. The title story was new, with its first publication intended for the collection, but two unauthorized editions appeared earlier in New York, based on pirated galley proofs. The other three stories first appeared in an anthology and periodicals in 1885, 1887, and 1886.

The significance of the collection was recognized by its republication (as Allan's Wife, With Hunter Quatermain's Story, a Tale of Three Lions, and Long Odds) by the Newcastle Publishing Company as the twenty-fourth volume of the celebrated Newcastle Forgotten Fantasy Library series in October, 1980.

== Contents ==
- Allan's Wife - the story of Quatermain's early life, and his marriage to Stella, mother of his son Harry. This novella is the seventh story in the Quatermain series and had never before been published.
- Hunter Quatermain's Story - at a Yorkshire dinner-party after the events of King Solomon's Mines (1885), Quatermain recounts an encounter he once had with a buffalo on an African hunting expedition. This short story originally appeared in 1885, and is the second Quatermain story.
- A Tale of Three Lions - Quatermain and his adolescent son Harry go hunting in Africa, and avenge their servant Jim-Jim after he is killed by a lioness. The short story was first published in 1887, and it is the fifth Quatermain adventure.
- Long Odds - in this short story, Quatermain describes how his leg was mauled by a lion on a hunting trip. Long Odds first appeared in 1886 and is the third entry in the Quatermain series.
