= Edith Sophia Hooper =

English suffragist (1868–1926)

Edith Sophia Hooper (4 March 1868 – 21 April 1926) was a British suffragette and biographer.

== Biographer ==
Hooper was born in Tenby, Pembrokeshire, Wales. She was matriculated at University of St Andrews.

Hooper wrote the biographies in DNB12 of the following people:

- George Rundle Prynne (1818–1903), a British Anglo-Catholic cleric known for his Tractarian and ritualist views.
- Josephine Butler (1828–1906), an English feminist and social reformer who campaigned for women's suffrage.
- Joseph Skipsey (1832–1903), a Northumbrian poet and a literary coal miner known as 'The Pitman Poet'.
- William Bury Westall (1834–1903), an English novelist born in Accrington, Lancashire who later became a journalist.
- Frank Podmore (1856–1910), an English author, founding member of the Fabian Society and an influential member of the Society for Psychical Research.

She was also a suffragist, as a member of the National Union of Women’s Suffrage Societies.
