= Allan and the Ice-gods =

1927 novel by H. Rider Haggard

Allan and the Ice-Gods: A Tale of Beginnings
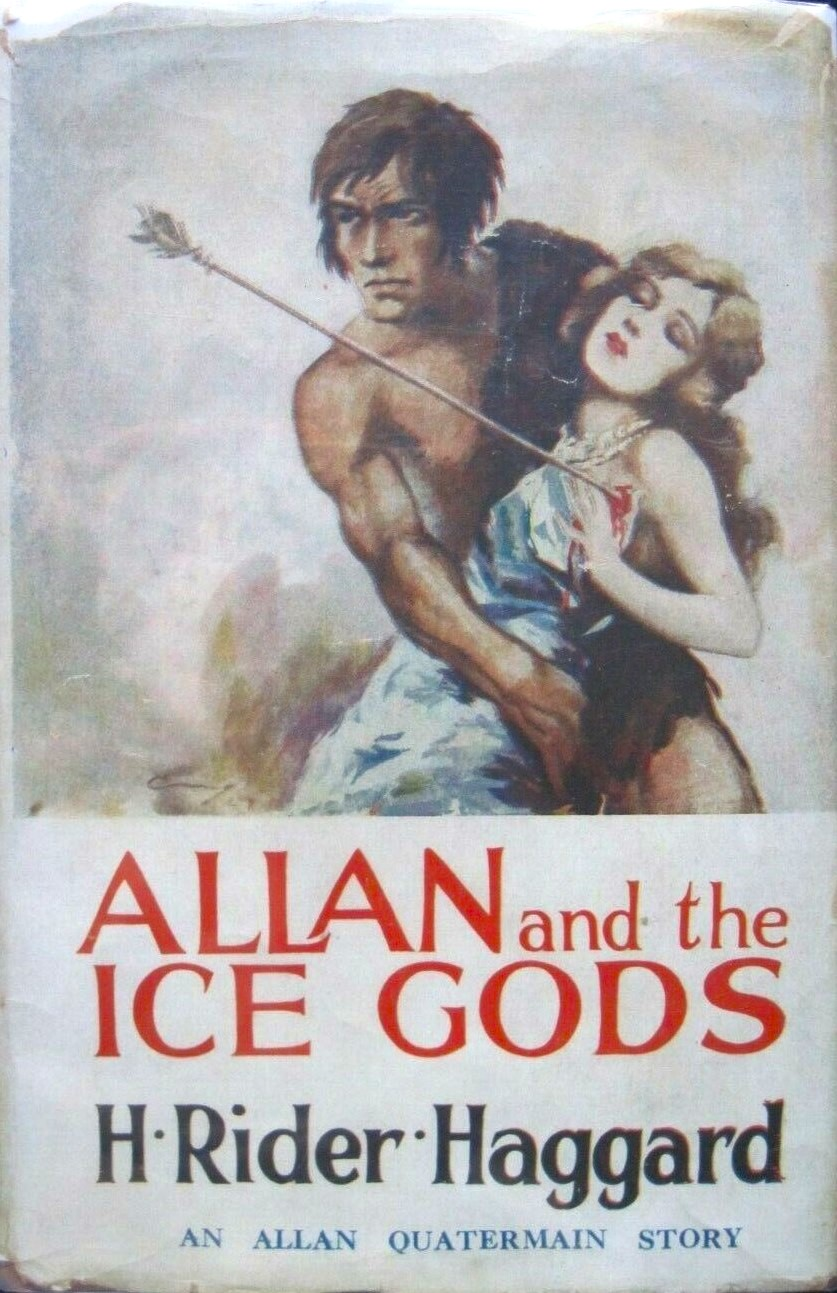
- First edition (UK)
- Author: H. Rider Haggard
- Language: English
- Genre: Fantasy novel Adventure
- Publisher: Hutchinson & Co (UK); Doubleday Doran (US)
- Publication date: 1927
- Publication place: United Kingdom
- Preceded by: The Ancient Allan
- Followed by: Allan Quatermain

Allan and the Ice-Gods is a novel by H. Rider Haggard featuring his recurring character Allan Quatermain, based on an idea given to Haggard by Rudyard Kipling. The story details Quatermain's past life regression to a Stone Age ancestor and the various adventures involved.

This was the fourteenth and final Allan Quatermain novel to be published, although the events of the novel Allan Quatermain occur after it. Haggard wrote eighteen Quatermain novels and short stories, and Allan and the Ice-Gods is the last of these. It is also the final Allan Quatermain novel in the trilogy involving the Taduki drug and Lady Luna Ragnall, following The Ivory Child, and The Ancient Allan.

The novel has been noted as a treatment of the topics of eugenics and evolution in literature and culture.

== Plot ==
Allan Quatermain, feeling awkward toward Lady Luna Ragnall after their recent taduki-induced vision in The Ancient Allan, in which they were nearly married, refuses three invitations from Lady Ragnall to return for another vision and has vowed never to use the drug again. Lady Ragnall herself informs Allan that she has used the taduki once more and discovered that their ancient counterparts, Amada and Shabaka, were indeed married.

Allan reads in the newspaper that Lady Ragnall has traveled to Egypt for the winter. Six weeks or so later, Allan has a psychic experience and later learns that Lady Ragnall had died of heart failure at that moment at the site of her husband’s grave in the Temple of Isis. Allan inherits her estate, coveted by Lord Ragnall’s next-of-kin, Mr. Atterby-Smith. He distributes it to charities except for a box containing the taduki drug which Lady Ragnall had left him. He is tempted to break his vow and use it, but finally resolves not to when his friend, Captain John Good, calls on him. Good is able to persuade Allan to use the drug and the two enter into their vision.

Allan awakens as Wi, a civilized man living in the barbaric Ice Age. He belongs to a culture that reveres a man and mammoth frozen in ice as their gods. His closest friend is Pag, an outcast who creates many new technologies. Wi challenges and kills his corrupt chief Henga and institutes reforms in the tribe: monogamy, decision by council, and the use of new technology. Pag rises in power in the tribe and is able to stop a pack of wolves from attacking. Wi and Pag travel into the wilderness to fight off a saber-toothed tiger. Wi discovers a beautiful young woman, unconscious, in a canoe. Her name is Laleela. Wi falls in love with her, as does Wi’s brother Moananga. Most of the tribe regards her as a witch and Wi’s wife Aaka wishes for her to be killed. Pag tries to convince Wi that he must marry Laleela in order to protect her, but Wi realizes this will break the oath of monogamy he has imposed upon the tribe.

A tribe of red-bearded warriors attacks and is defeated. Wi also kills an aurochs. When he rejects the ice-gods for Laleela's faith, the tribe demands someone from his household be sacrificed. After some deliberation, Wi offers himself as sacrifice. Before the sacrifice takes place, the ice-gods thaw and the glacier they were frozen in plows through the tribe. The Ice Age is ending. Wi and his companions leave the tribe and sail south but are caught in the rapids. Wi, noticing that their boat is overburdened, stays on an ice flow. Pag swims back to him. It is at this point that Allan and Good awaken.

Allan and Good discuss their adventure. They determine that Good was Moananga, Laleela was Luna Ragnall, and Allan’s sometime companion Hans was the outcast Pag. Allan surmises that they are not actually experiencing past lives, but that the taduki drug has “the power of awakening the ancestral memory which has come down to us with our spark of life through scores of intervening forefathers.” He also guesses that Wi and his companions dwelt in Ice Age Scotland, 500,000 or 50,000 years ago, and that Laleela came from southern Ireland or northern France.

== Reception ==
David Pringle gave Allan and the Ice-Gods two stars out of four.

== Influence ==
Philip José Farmer and Christopher Paul Carey used characters and plot elements from Allan and the Ice-Gods in their Khokarsa series of prehistoric adventure novels, a body of fiction which in Farmer's words "represents an amalgamation between [the works of] Burroughs and Haggard." The writers also incorporated into their series elements from other works by Haggard: She (1887), Allan Quatermain (1887), Nada the Lily (1892), and She and Allan (1921).
