= The Ghost Kings =

1908 novel by H. Rider Haggard

- 1926 reprint
- Author: H. Rider Haggard
- Language: English
- Publisher: Cassell
- Publication date: 1908
- Publication place: United Kingdom
- Preceded by: Marie (internal chronology); Ayesha (publication order)
- Followed by: Allan's Wife (internal chronology); Marie (publication order)

The Ghost Kings is a 1908 mystery-adventure novel by H. Rider Haggard, set on the borders of Zululand in Africa.

== Plot Outline ==
Rachel Dove, a British missionary's daughter who has been trekked almost all her young life around the wilds of Africa while her father preaches the Good Word to the natives and her mother suffers silently. Her life is turned around when fellow teenager Richard Darrien rescues her from a flash flood; their common initials alone may clue the reader in that these two are another pair of Haggard's predestined lovers. Some years later however, Rachel not having seen Richard during all that intervening time, runs afoul of one of the author's patented lustful villains, Ishmael, a renegade Englishman who plots with the Zulu king to have Rachel for his own. This task is made complicated for the rogue when the Zulus come to view Rachel as their Inkosazana y Zoola or Great Lady of the Heavens; the embodiment and incarnation of their goddess. Rachel, accompanied by Noie, her faithful half Zulu attendant discovers a lost civilisations, the Ghost Kings: a dwarf-like tribe of tree worshippers who are able to peer into the future with their bowls of dew. Similarly, Ishmael who practically goes insane with lust over the beautiful Rachel. Noie is the exotic woman who dares much for love and sacrifice more. Rachel's mother and to a lesser degree, Rachel herself are endowed throughout the tale with the gift of second sight, a foreseeing ability that aids her on several crucial occasions. And while the Zulu untakatis (wizards) do not play a role here. The magic of the Ghost Kings is shown to be very real and not a little eerie.

Mopo, the witch doctor from Nada the Lily also appears in this book.

== Reception ==
The Athenaeum magazine described the novel thus:

In this story Mr. Rider Haggard returns to the manner of his earlier romances to such good purpose that, despite its length and somewhat episodic character, interest is kept up from beginning to end.

Discussing The Ghost Kings, E. F. Bleiler wrote: "a excellent long, detailed description of pioneer life on the veldt is a strong point, but the romance is extraneous and weak".
