= Heu-Heu =

1924 novel by H. Rider Haggard

Heu-Heu; or, The Monster
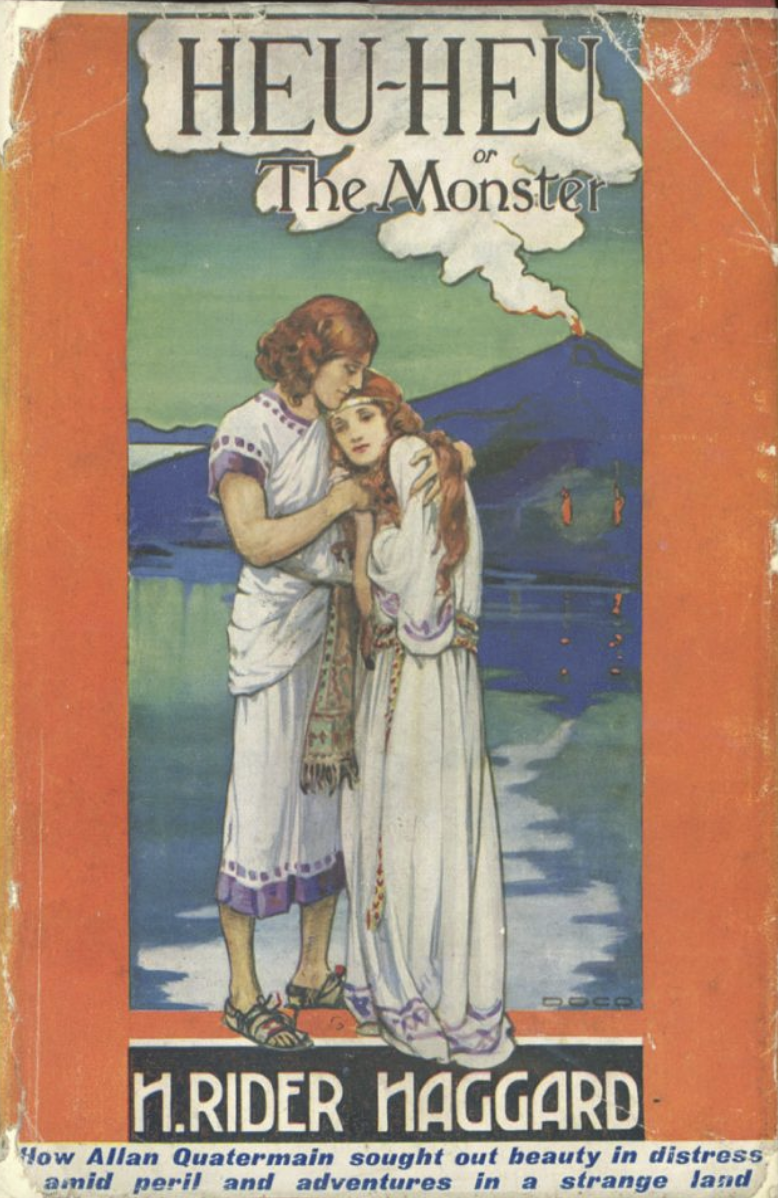
- First edition (UK)
- Author: Sir H. Rider Haggard
- Language: English
- Publisher: Hutchinson & Co (UK); Doubleday Doran (US)
- Publication date: 1924
- Publication place: United Kingdom
- Preceded by: The Holy Flower
- Followed by: She and Allan

Heu-Heu; or, The Monster is a novel by H. Rider Haggard. Allan Quatermain tells the story of a monster in Southern Rhodesia. Heu-Heu is the twelfth of the fourteen novels in the Quatermain series and the sixteenth of the eighteen overall stories.

The novel features a legend about a giant gorilla monster, to which young women are sacrificed. Some writers have speculated that Heu-Heu influenced the plot of the film King Kong (see Influence).

== Plot ==
Allan and his sidekick, the faithful and always amusing Hottentot Hans go on a mission for the Zulu wizard Zikali (who had previously appeared several times in the series) and endeavour to bring back some leaves from the rare Tree of Illusions. They also attempt to delve into the mystery of Heu-Heu, a monstrous, 12-foot-tall, clawed and red-bearded semi-gorilla god who may or may not exist. As is usual in Haggard's novels, Heu-Heu starts off with an action set piece, a storm in which the heroes are forced to seek shelter in a Bushmen's cave, and from there moves swiftly and excitingly.

== Reception ==
E. F. Bleiler's review of Heu-Heu states "while the lost-race aspects of the Walloo are somewhat stale, the descriptions of Black native life are, as always, fascinating"

== Influence ==
It has been suggested that Heu-Heu influenced the script of the movie King Kong (by Merian C. Cooper and Edgar Wallace), which has a similar plotline.

Writer G.W. Thomas has speculated that Heu-Heu influenced the ape-monsters of Robert E. Howard in the 1930s, in stories such as "Rogues in the House" and "Queen of the Black Coast".

== Links to other works by Haggard ==
The motif of an ape-monster deified by a lost African tribe had appeared in a previous Quatermain adventure, The Holy Flower (1915).

In the fourth chapter of Heu-Heu, the wizard Zikali mentions the Taduki drug. This strange herb first appears in The Ivory Child (1916), and enables Quatermain to have visions of his past lives in The Ancient Allan (1920) and Allan and the Ice-Gods (1927).

Heu-Heu also marks the fourth and final appearance of Zikali in the Quatermain series.
