= King Solomon's Mines (2004 film) =

- Based on: King Solomon's Mines by H. Rider Haggard
- Written by: Steven H. Berman
- Directed by: Steve Boyum
- Starring: Patrick Swayze; Alison Doody; Roy Marsden; John Standing
- Theme music composer: Mark Kilian
- Country of origin: United States
- Original language: English
- No. of episodes: 2

Production
- Producer: Russell D. Markowitz
- Cinematography: William Wages
- Editor: Craig Bassett
- Running time: 173 minutes
- Production companies: Enigma Pictures; Hallmark Entertainment

Original release
- Network: Hallmark Channel
- Release: June 6, 2004

King Solomon's Mines is a 2004 American two-part television miniseries, the fifth film adaptation of the 1885 novel of the same name by Henry Rider Haggard. Starring Patrick Swayze as Allan Quatermain (it is spelled Allan Quartermain in the credits, unlike the book, which has Allan Quatermain) and Alison Doody as Elizabeth Maitland, the film was produced by Hallmark Entertainment, and originally aired June 6, 2004, on Hallmark Channel.

== Plot ==
=== Part One ===
In Africa, wealthy businessman Mr. Bitter is on safari with his guides, Allan Quatermain and Bruce McNabb. He wishes to kill a family of African bush elephants, but Quatermain insists otherwise. McNabb betrays and subdues Quatermain while the others open fire. Later, the wounded mother elephant destroys their camp and kills Bitter, dying shortly after just as Quatermain prepares to euthanise it. He whispers "sorry, girl" with genuine compassion and remorse at how he failed to prevent the tragedy.

Samuel Maitland, a British archaeologist, writes a letter to his daughter Elizabeth, enclosing a map to the fabled mines of King Solomon. Shortly after sending the letter, he is captured by native KuaKuani tribesman. Their warlock, Twala, seeks more power and believes he can obtain it by finding the Stone of the Ancestors, an artifact hidden in Solomon's mines.

Quatermain returns to London wishing to spend time with his son, Harry. However, Harry's grandparents have filed for custody, declaring Quatermain an unfit parent. His lawyer tells him that, without a substantial amount of money, he cannot win the case so he goes to the bar. There, Elizabeth Maitland and Captain Good, her uncle and bodyguard, find him and ask for his help. He refuses and they leave him her card, but once he realises who her father is he agrees to help. Quatermain finds Elizabeth being attacked by a Russian man, Sergei, whom he fends off. The pair return to Elizabeth's hotel room to find it ransacked. Only then Elizabeth reveals that she must travel to Africa to trade the map for her father's life.

Arriving in Africa, Quatermain enlists the help of his acquaintances, Ventvogel, Khiva, and, after a brief fight, his close friend Sir Henry Curtis. Meanwhile, three Russian men tasked with retrieving the map - Colonel Ivan Fleekov, Petre and Sergei - enlist McNabb as their guide, telling him they may have to kill Quatermain to which he agrees.

Quatermain and Elizabeth come to respect one another as the journey progresses, especially after he saves her from a cheetah that invades her tent one morning. When the group reach the drop-off location, however, they find their contact dead and an imposter in his place. They are ambushed by the Russians and Quatermain must make a dangerous ride through a crossfire to save miss Maitland. McNabb has a shot on Quatermain but does not take it, resulting in Petre being shot in the abdomen.

After seeking the counsel of a witch doctor, the group realise they must cross the great Kalahari Desert. Quatermain talks to an African man who has been seen following them throughout the whole journey, and he introduces himself as Umbopa, saying he can be of help and has crossed the great desert before. They agree for him to travel with the group.

After McNabb fails to fall for a ruse involving multiple tracks, the Russians gain ground and the group apparently set up camp, but as the Russians close in on the camp it becomes apparent that it, too, is a trick and is empty. The Russians fall behind again. As they begin to catch up in the desert, Quatermain's group find a rock formation of a cobra, which leads them to a tomb containing the key to Solomon's mines. However, while Quatermain and the others retrieve the key, the Russians arrive, incapacitate Captain Good and kidnap miss Maitland.

=== Part Two ===
Both groups press on through the desert making for an oasis. Petre succumbs to his injuries and dies, while both parties nearly die of thirst. After Quatermain's party reach the oasis first, they ambush the Russians leading to a tense standoff. Elizabeth creates a distraction and escapes leading to an exchange of fire in which Ventvogel is injured and the Russians seize the map and the key.

After Umbopo leads them through the valleys on the other side of the desert and they gain ground on the Russians, the group sets a trap to retrieve the map. The trap initially succeeds, and McNabb is forced at gunpoint to drop the bag containing the map and key, as he and the Russians are driven off by gunfire. Khiva makes a run for the bag but is shot by both Sergei and Fleekov. Quatermain rescues the badly wounded Khiva while Henry and Ventvogel fatally shoot Sergei. As the firefight continues, Elizabeth tries to retrieve the map as McNabb prepares to kill her. However, Quatermain disarms McNabb and shoots him in the shoulder, then wounds the colonel. Khiva dies from his injuries and the others mourn him.

Quatermain's group continues toward the Kuakuani village, followed by Fleekov and McNabb, who survived their injuries. After being ambushed by warriors, Umbopa reveals his true name to be Ignosi, the rightful king. The warriors escort the group, as well as McNabb and Fleekov who were also captured, to their village where Ignosi challenges Twala to Nomolos; a fight to the death, for the throne. Elizabeth is reunited with her father who has survived his captivity. It is revealed that Ignosi and Twala do not fight each other personally, but rather select a representative. Ignosi has chosen Quatermain.

On the morning of the fight, McNabb and Fleekov escape their bindings and search for the key as the Nomolos begins. Initially it is evenly matched but Twala's warrior gains the upper hand and almost kills Quatermain. Quatermain manages to turn the fight around and prepares to make the killing blow, but instead he slams the axe into the ground near the warriors head as a show of mercy. Ignosi congratulates him on winning, but Twala attempts to kill him by throwing a spear. Henry sees the danger and intervenes, saving Quatermain by taking the spear himself. Quatermain tries to help but Henry dies, saying "Take good care of that lass." Enraged, Quatermain prepares to kill Twala but Ignosi intervenes. To their surprise, the warriors all close in and kill Twala without orders.

Fleekov and McNabb find the key but are discovered by Gagool, the Kuakuani witch doctor. She kills Fleekov with magic, entrancing him and forcing him to asphyxiate, but lets McNabb go, telling him he may find what he seeks, but he will never possess it. Gagool approaches Ignosi and is allowed to remain witch doctor of the tribe after Samuel vouches for her. She presents Ignosi with the key to the mines, which he gives to Quatermain. He explains that whilstever there is interest in the mines his people will not be safe, and asks Quatermain and Elizabeth to destroy the stone of the ancestors.

The pair travel to the mines where McNabb ambushes them and engages Quatermain in a fight. He is killed after Quatermain throws him down a flight of stairs onto one of many spring loaded spears that protrude from the floor when triggered. Quatermain and Elizabeth find the stone but when they touch it the cavern seals them in. Awaiting death, Quatermain proposes to Elizabeth to which she says yes, and suddenly they remember a shaft of sunlight lancing into the mine indicating a way out. They take a ring from a statue, triggering the start of an avalanche, and begin to climb out of the mine, throwing the stone back in behind them. They barely escape as the entire mine collapses. Months later Quatermain and Elizabeth are married and live in a cottage on the African savannah, with Harry living with them.

== Cast ==
- Patrick Swayze as Allan Quatermain
- Alison Doody as Elizabeth Maitland
- Roy Marsden as Captain John Good
- John Standing as Professor Samuel Maitland
- Gavin Hood as Bruce McNabb
- Sidede Onyulo as Umbopa
- Ian Roberts as Sir Henry Curtis
- Nick Boraine as Colonel Ivan Fleekov
- Hakeem Kae-Kazim as Twala
- Lesedi Mogoathle as Gagool (sorcerer)
- Langley Kirkwood as Sergei
- Godfrey Lekala as Khiva
- Mesia Gumede as Ventvogel
- Morne Visser as Petre
- Douglas Bristow as Bushell
- Graham Hopkins as Austin
