= Wisdom's Daughter =

1923 novel by H. Rider Haggard

Wisdom's Daughter: The Life and Love Story of She-Who-Must-Be-Obeyed
- First edition (UK)
- Author: H. Rider Haggard
- Language: English
- Series: Ayesha Series
- Genre: Fantasy, lost world, Gothic novel
- Publisher: Hutchinson & Co (UK); Doubleday Page (US)
- Publication date: 1923
- Publication place: United Kingdom
- Media type: Print (hardback)
- Pages: 383
- OCLC: 228068120
- Dewey Decimal: 823/.8
- Preceded by: She and Allan (publication order)
- Followed by: Nada the Lily (internal chronology); Heu-Heu (publication order)

Wisdom's Daughter is a fantasy novel by British writer H. Rider Haggard, published in 1923, by Hutchinson & Co in the UK and Doubleday, Page and Company in the US. It is the final published book in the Ayesha series but chronologically the first book in the series. Along with the other three novels in the series, Wisdom's Daughter was adapted into the 1935 film She.

== Overview ==
At the end of Haggard's 1887 novel, She: A History of Adventure, the title character appeared to be killed; but promised to return.

In Ayesha, the second book, the two adventurers from the first novel, Leo and Holly, are inspired to look for She in Tibet.

They discover people who have lived in a hidden mountain since the time of Alexander the Great. They find Ayesha leading the cult of Hes, though they do not recognise her at first. After which, they plan to return to The Flame of Life, in Kor, Africa; but first they have to wait for the paths to clear in the spring.

Talking to Leo and Holly reminds Ayesha of the past; including the time she met Allan Quatermain, recounted in She and Allan, the third book in the series.

While they are waiting, She takes the time to write out her memories and plans to rule the world, through her alchemy, and return the Ancient Egyptian cult of Isis to prominence and power.

The narrative breaks off abruptly, and returns to the conclusion of the story in Ayesha.

The novel includes several historical figures of the 4th century BC as characters, including the Pharaohs Nectanebo I and Nectanebo II, Emperor Artaxerxes III, King Tennes of Sidon, Greek mercenary Mentor of Rhodes, and the Persian eunuch Bagoas. It is also implied that Ayesha was the model for the Aphrodite of Knidos.

Ayesha (Book Cover), from original 1905 artwork.

== Frame story ==
As in the other books in the series, there is a frame story, which links the fantasy elements to their publication in the real world.

In this case, after Holly's death, the Executor of his will decides to publish this manuscript as the fourth and final book in the series, instead of destroying it as Holly had instructed. Although, the manuscript has been partially burned, most of it is intact. The Executor doesn't think of it as more than a work of imagination. However, before Holly's death, he was holding the Sistrum of Isis, and he was visited by a spirit of some kind, which the Executor thinks might have been She.

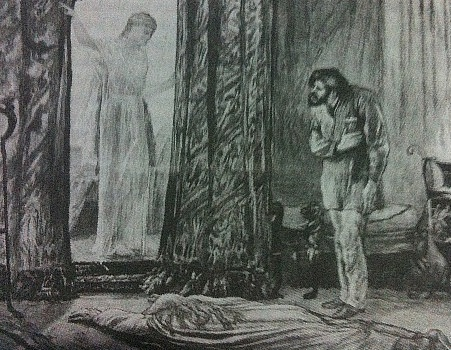
She is so beautiful Holly can only bear to look at her veiled, from the Graphic (1886)

== Plot ==
As Holly points out, the story is told from She's perspective, and since She claims to have lived for over two thousand years, since Ancient Egypt, there is no way to compare her story with any other sources, or witnesses.

She Who Must Be Obeyed says that she was Arabian by birth, given the name Ayesha.

Although, in the introduction, Sir H. Rider Haggard links the name Ayesha to Mohammed's wives, and Arabic or Arabic names, (Arabic: عائشة, Āʾishah), stating that it should be pronounced "Ash/ -ha"; A·ye·sha/ äˈ(y)ēSHə/, is perhaps more common.

She claims that her natural beauty and wisdom was so great, it caused wars between the princes, who wanted to marry her. She says that while this was at first a great source of pride among her Father's people, they soon began to resent her, and spread vicious rumours that she was cursed.

Ayesha leads her Father's people into victory, and revels in the battle, but the women envy her, and the men lust after her. So, she decides to go into hiding, with her tutor, an Egyptian priest, rather than be turned over to the approaching armies of Pharaoh.

She tells about travelling through the ancient world, encountering all the major artists, who want her to model for them; as well as philosophers, and religions of the time, from Ancient Greece and fledgling Ancient Rome to Palestine and Jerusalem.

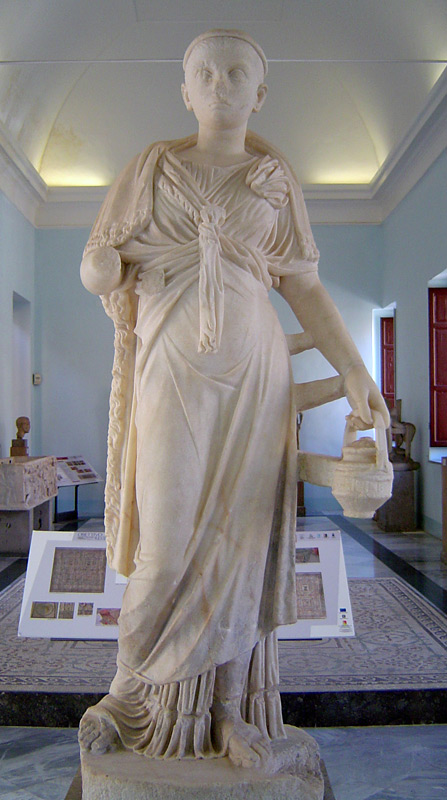
A statue of a priestess of Isis, Roman, 2nd century, BCE

Finally, they return to Egypt, where once again, her beauty and wisdom become a source of contention. She swears an oath of celibacy, to serve Isis the Goddess of the Spirit of Nature, and turn away from Aphrodite the Goddess of Love.

But, soon a Greek soldier of fortune, Kallikrates, formerly employed by the Pharaoh, comes to her for sanctuary. He takes an oath to serve Isis, but the Pharaoh's daughter pursues him and, seeing the way Ayesha looks at him, she determines to destroy her, as a rival.

The Princess mocks Ayesha's prophecies as mere parlor tricks. She goads her Father into giving Ayesha away, as a sex slave, to one of his allies.

Repeatedly, Ayesha is in danger, but even in the midst of fire and battle, Isis and her followers save her from ruin and rape. Ayesha's fame grows so great, that she is called "Isis Come To Earth" and "Wisdom's Daughter".

Finally, the King of Kings, of the Persian Empire, comes to see her. He laughs that anyone would be afraid of what must be an old hag, as Isis's Priestess. He spits on Isis's statues and burns the old gods. However, again her beauty, which the King glimpses beneath her veil, betrays her, and he determines to rape her, with the rest of the country.

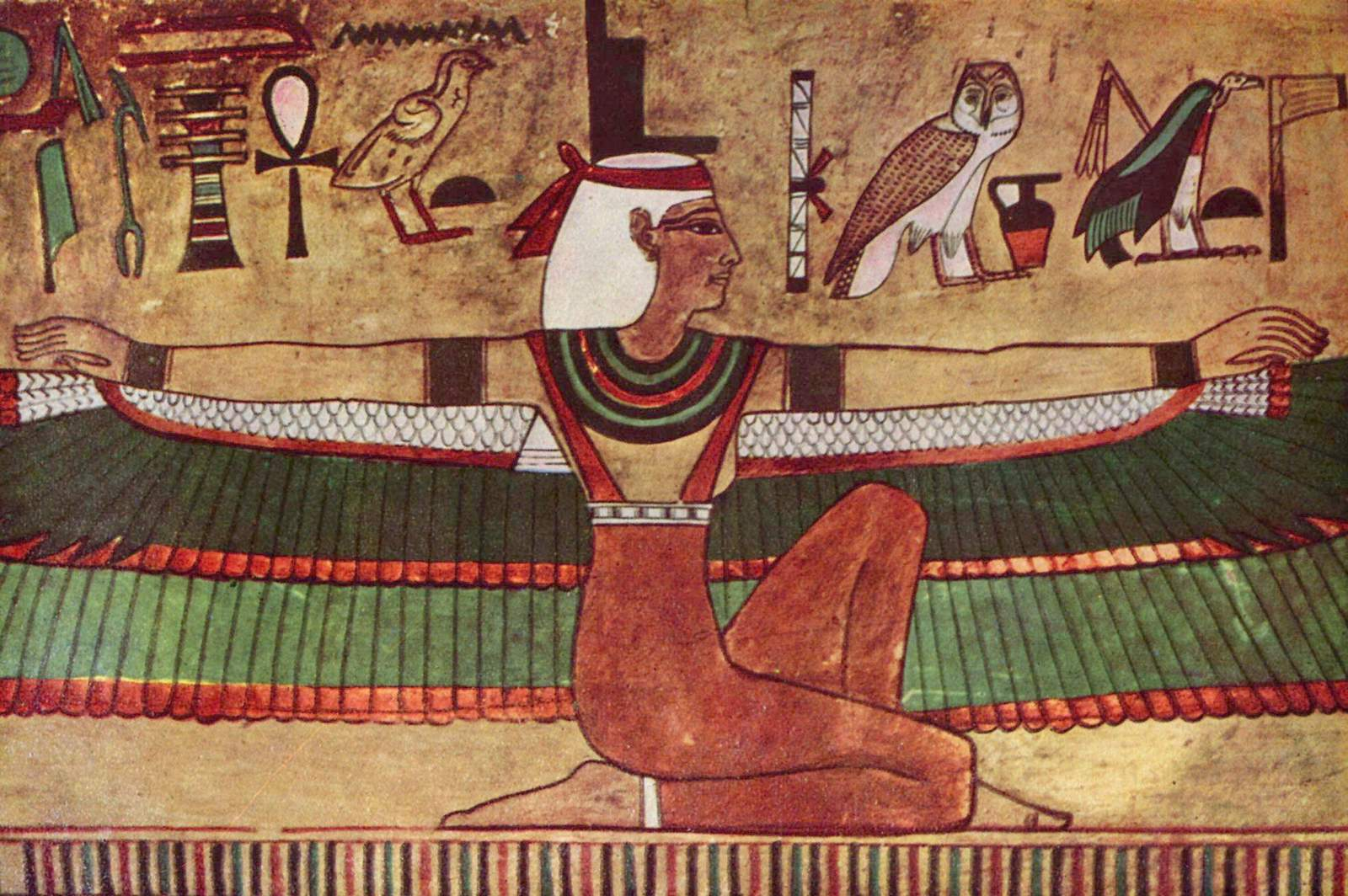
A temple wall painting of the Goddess Isis, circa 1360 BCE

Isis saves her and they escape, to reunite with her old Captain, Kallikrates, and the Princess.

Ayesha is inspired that Isis wants to rebuild her cult and usher in a new Golden Age, in the world, through herself. She is led to the hidden kingdom of Kor, in Africa, to begin.

Once there, Ayesha meets her former tutor, who has been guarding The Flame of Eternal Life, which will make a person young and powerful, for as long as the world endures. He passes this one last mystery onto Ayesha, warning her of its temptation to her vanity.

The Princess mocks Ayesha's fading youth; feeling ashamed, in front of Kallikrates, Ayesha determines to break her oaths, and make herself and him both immortal, to rule the world, like Gods, by stepping into The Flame. This way she feels she will be as "Isis Come To Earth", indeed. But, "Wisdom's Daughter" is Fortune's Fool, and falls by Love's Folly.

Kallikrates is afraid when he sees Ayesha in her preternatural beauty, after she has bathed in The Flame, and dies. The others either flee in terror or are killed, overwhelmed by her beauty. Aphrodite laughs at her, and Isis.

Now, Ayesha cannot die, or she will be opposed. She is as terrible, beautiful, and deadly as lightning.

After Kallikrates' death, the Princess flees, urging her descendants to revenge themselves on She, through the artifacts she passes down, which Holly and Leo find, in the first book, She: A History of Adventure.

Sir H. Rider Haggard's recreation of the Sherd of Amenartas, now in the collection of the Norwich Castle Museum, in which the Egyptian Princess urges Leo's descendants to revenge themselves on She.

Ayesha is doomed to wait, in Kor, for his return, through the centuries, becoming weary of the world. She has learned everything the world and Nature has to offer, but still she must wait, for love and redemption.
