= Finished (novel) =

1917 novel by H. Rider Haggard

- First US edition
- Author: H. Rider Haggard
- Cover artist: A. C. Michael
- Language: English
- Series: Allan Quatermain Series
- Publisher: Ward Lock & Co (UK); Longmans Green (US)
- Publication date: 1917
- Publication place: United Kingdom
- Preceded by: Child of Storm

Finished is a 1917 novel by H. Rider Haggard featuring Allan Quatermain. It is the last in a trilogy about the Zulu kingdom, which also includes Marie and Child of Storm, and involved the dwarf Zikali. Across the broader Quatermain series it is the ninth novel and the thirteenth story overall.

It is set against the background of the Anglo-Zulu War of 1879, covering events leading up to the war, and ending with the death of Cetewayo. Quatermain is depicted as being one of the few survivors of the Battle of Isandhlwana. Like others in the series, several real-life characters appear, such as Cetewayo and Anthony Durnford.
