= The Holy Flower =

1915 novel by H. Rider Haggard

Allan and the Holy Flower
- First edition (UK)
- Author: H. Rider Haggard
- Original title: The Holy Flower
- Language: English
- Series: Allan Quatermain Series
- Genre: Adventure
- Publisher: Ward Lock & Co (UK); Longmans, Green (US)
- Publication date: 1915
- Publication place: United Kingdom
- Preceded by: "Long Odds"
- Followed by: Heu-heu: or, The Monster

The Holy Flower (known as Allan and the Holy Flower in America) is a 1915 novel by H. Rider Haggard featuring Allan Quatermain. It was serialised in The Windsor Magazine from issue 228 (December 1913) to 239 (November 1914), illustrated by Maurice Greiffenhagen, and in New Story Magazine from December 1913 through June 1914. The plot involves Quatermain going on a trek into Africa to find a mysterious flower. It is the seventh Quatermain novel, and the eleventh Quatermain story overall.

== Plot ==
Brother John, who has been wandering in Africa for years, confides to Allan a huge and rare orchid, the largest ever found. Allan arrives to England with the flower and there he meets Mr. Stephen Somers.

Due to a mixup at auction, Somers ends up paying a huge sum for a particularly rare flower. His Father agrees to cover the cost of the flower but also disinherits his son. Stephen resolves to sell the flower and use it to finance an expedition to Africa to recover a live specimen of the huge orchid Allan brought back with him.

They meet Arabian slave traders, warrior tribes, cannibals, and a giant gorilla.

== Bibliography ==
- Title: Allan and the Holy Flower
- Author: Henry Rider Haggard
- Publishers : Ward Lock & Co (UK), Longmans, Green, and Company (USA), 1915
- 384 pages
- Language: English
- Series: Allan Quatermain
- Genre: Adventure
