= Marie (novel) =

1912 novel by Henry Rider Haggard

- First US edition, (1917 dustjacket, picture appears as frontispiece of first UK edition)
- Author: H. Rider Haggard
- Language: English
- Series: Allan Quatermain Series
- Publisher: Cassell (UK); Longman & Co. (US)
- Publication date: 1912
- Publication place: United Kingdom
- Media type: Print (Hardback)
- Pages: 346
- Preceded by: Nada the Lily (internal chronology); The Ghost Kings (publication order)
- Followed by: The Ghost Kings (internal chronology); Magepa the Buck (publication order)

Marie is a 1912 novel by H. Rider Haggard featuring Allan Quatermain. The plot concerns Quatermain as a young man and involves his first marriage, to the Boer farm girl, Marie Marais. Their romance is opposed by Marie's anti-English father, and her villainous cousin Hernan Pereira, who desires Marie. They are Voortrekkers who take part in the Great Trek whom Quatermain has to rescue. Marie is the fifth novel, and the eighth story overall, in the Allan Quatermain series.

The novel describes Quatermain's involvement in the Sixth Xhosa War of 1835 and Weenen massacre. Real life people such as Piet Retief, Thomas Halstead, and the Zulu chief Dingane appear as characters. Events in Nada the Lily are frequently referred to.

== Plot ==
The plot begins in Cradock, a District of Cape Colony, a wild place with a handful of white settlers. Fifteen miles from the Mission station where Allan and his father, who is a church of England clergyman, live, there resides a Boer called Henry Marais, who has a young daughter named Marie. Allan and Marie meet when they are given a tutor called Monsieur Leblanc who teaches them French language and other subjects. What starts as a childhood friendship slowly grows into a fully fledged love and deep affection, much to the chagrin of Marie's father, who tries everything within his power to separate them. One day, monsieur Leblanc goes to one of his Sunday riding expeditions. Being intoxicated with his Peach brandy, and after sleeping, he wakes up to find his horse missing. Thinking it stolen, he sets out to look for it when he by chance comes across two red Kaffirs leading it away though looking for its owner to restore it to him. On sighting them, he shoots the eldest son of the chief and he drops dead. When he fires again, he injures the other son on the thigh but he manages to run away to tell the tale.

The result is that they trace the attacker to Maraisfontein and plans an ambush attack on it to avenge the death by killing all its inhabitants and driving away all their cattle. On hearing this, and with the little time available, Allan manages to raise support and tries as much as he can to save Maraisfontein. Though with initial success, with their supply of gunpowder dwindling, and almost losing the fight, they almost commit suicide when Henry Marais comes with other Boers from other camps and fires at the red Kaffirs thus bringing the matter to a happy conclusion. Allan saves Marie's life together with those of the servants save for Monsieur Leblanc who is captured and killed by the foe.

After this, the love between Marie and Allan grows, and her father gets wind of the affair and tries to oppose it, because of his hatred of the English, and also because he had promised his daughter's hand in marriage to another Boer called Hernando Pereira, who, on learning of how Marie loves Allan and would rather die than marry Pereira, also hates Allan to the bone. He challenges Allan to a shooting match where they are to shoot at birds but Allan beats him to the game, and he and other Boers together with Marie's family decide to move away and finally settle at the banks of the Crocodile river some 50 miles from Delagoa Bay. Overtaken by hunger and fever, Marie writes a letter to Allan, who organizes himself, says goodbye to his father, and goes to their rescue with a good supply of food and other necessary provisions. He finally saves Marie's life for the second time, something which makes Marie love him even more.

Slowly they recover, and they plan a journey to look for another place where the pasture of life is green. On the way, they encounter Dingane a king of the Zulu tribe's forces which had been sent to kill Allan. They, after much deliberation agree to take Allan and all his company to the king, who ends up liking Allan. But he gives Allan a bet. He tells Allan to shoot three of five vultures with his gun to prove his magic and all his companions will be left to go free, something which he does, thus saving Marie's life for yet another time. When Marie becomes of age, Allan marries her though without her father's blessings. And after then set off to Dingane on matters of a Treaty about a piece of land that the Boers want to possess. Mistrusting the Boers, he tricks, deserts and his regiment massacres them saving Allan's life. Allan returns to his home and finds Marie weeping by the river where she had gone to draw water, wearing the robes of mourning. He goes home with her and all the people are excited to see him alive.

When Hernando Pereira and his company arrive, due to Hernando Pereira's jealousy for winning Marie's hand in marriage, they are unhappy to see Allan alive and plot on how to exterminate him. They form a court to try Allan, build up false charges against him and sentence him to death by shooting. As the party move away to deliberate on how to execute him, Allan's servant spies on them and a plot is made of how to rescue him from death. They drug Allan's coffee with sleep inducing herbs brought by his servant, dresses him in Marie's clothes and then hide him in a grain pit leaving Marie in his place of detention.

In the morning, Marie is taken out for execution. Thinking her to be Allan, she is shot at by Hernando Pereira, who in turn is shot at by Henry Marais for shooting his beloved daughter. As Hernando lies down in fits of his impending death, he confesses that he bore false witness during Allan's trial so as to bring him to his death. Hernando later dies with a lot of people heaping curses upon him. A letter is given to Allan from Marie; she thanks him for saving her life three times, and says that she has saved his life now in the end, and is going to where she will be waiting for their reunion.
