= Cecil Bernard Rutley =

English novelist (1888–1956)

C. Bernard Rutley
- Born: 31 July 1888; Lewisham, London, England
- Died: September 20, 1956 (aged 68); Basingstoke, Hampshire, England
- Occupation: Writer (novelist)
- Writing career
- Period: 20th century
- Genre: Fiction

Cecil Bernard Rutley (31 July 1888 – 20 September 1956) was a British writer of fantasy and science fiction. He signed his books using the name "C. Bernard Rutley".

== Biography ==
Rutley was born in Lewisham, London, England in 1888. He began writing in the 1920s specializing in stories for young boys. The plots of his stories are centred around a school that is under some sort of threat. In The Box of St. Bidolph's, the school land is claimed by a wealthy landowner. Three senior boys set out to prove him wrong. In the 1930s he started writing books in the science and fantasy genre, including several books about inventions created for sinister purposes: The Exploding Ray (1945), Crimson Rust (1946) and Valley of Doom (1947). Rutley also wrote several Haggardian adventures in the lost world genre, such as The Khan's Carpet (1940), the Honor Lang trilogy (1943 - 1948) and The Cave of Winds (1947).

== Works ==
- The Treasure Of The Tremaynes, (1925)
- In Quest Of The Black Orchid, (1926) [illustrated by Henry Evison]
- Tales Of Stirring Times, (1927)
- Our Empire's Wondrous Story, (1927)
- The Chums Of Moorhaven, (1928)
- The Box of St. Bidolph's, (1929)
- Li-Li, The Chieftainess: A Tale Of The Beginning Of Things, (1930)
- The Book Of Animals, (1935)
- Astray In The Forest, (1935)
- The Golden Mirage, (1938) [illustrated by J. P. Patterson]
- The Khan's Carpet, (1940) [illustrated by Reginald Cleaver]
- Sinister Island, (1942)
- Wild Life In Canada, (1943) [illustrated by Stuart Tresilian]
- The Universal Testimony On The Holy Bible, (1944) [published anonymously]
- The Exploding Ray, (1945)
- The Crimson Rust, (1946) [illustrated by Stokes May]
- The Cave of Winds, (1947)
- Valley of Doom, (1947)
- The Country of Gold, (1947) [illustrated by Charles Roylance]
- The Golden Parrot, (1948) [illustrated by Thomas Perks]
- The Forbidden Land, (1950) [illustrated by John de Walton]

=== Honor Lang series ===
- The Ring of Nenuphar, (1943)
- The Quest of Honor, (1945)
- The Queen of Lost City, (1948)
