= Frederick Carruthers Cornell =

English-born South African writer

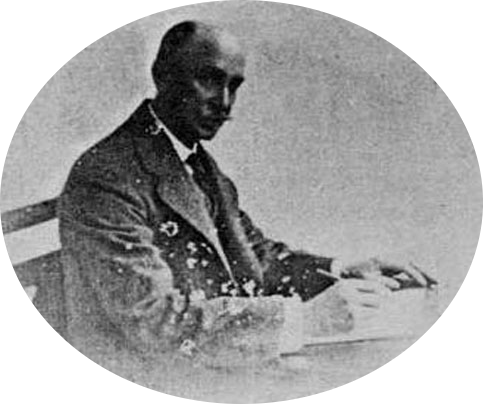
- Born: 6 May 1867
- Died: 6 March 1921 (aged 53)
- Occupations: writer, geologist, prospector, soldier
- Years active: 1902–1921
- Notable work: The Glamour of Prospecting

Frederick Carruthers Cornell OBE (6 May 1867 – 6 March 1921) was an English soldier, geologist, prospector and author born in Devon, England, and educated at the Bedford School. Cornell is best known for his war time activities during the Maritz rebellion and the First World War as well as for his publications.

He studied music and languages in London. In 1902, he came to South Africa, and displayed great interest in Namaqualand. During the First World War he served with the South African Native Labour Corps in which he served as a Lieutenant, and was the first to notify the South African forces that the Germans had crossed into the Cape from German South West Africa. He was an editor of "The Cape Register". His publications include a volume of reminiscences The Glamour of Prospecting (1920) which has become an important eyewitness account of the Herero and Namaqua genocide by the Germans between 1904 and 1908. His collection of short stories, some of which are considered to be among South Africa's finest, are found in A Rip Van Winkle of the Kalahari and Other Tales of South West Africa (1915). He also wrote martial poetry, including "A Soldier's Song" about the Battle of Delville Wood in World War One.

Cornell was appointed as an officer of the Order of the British Empire for his military service.

Cornell died on 6 March 1921 in a motor vehicle accent. He was married and had eight children.

== Publications ==
- A Rip Van Winkle of the Kalahari, 1915
- The Glamour of Prospecting, 1920
