= Maiwa's Revenge =

1888 novel by H. Rider Haggard

Maiwa's Revenge, or The War of the Little Hand
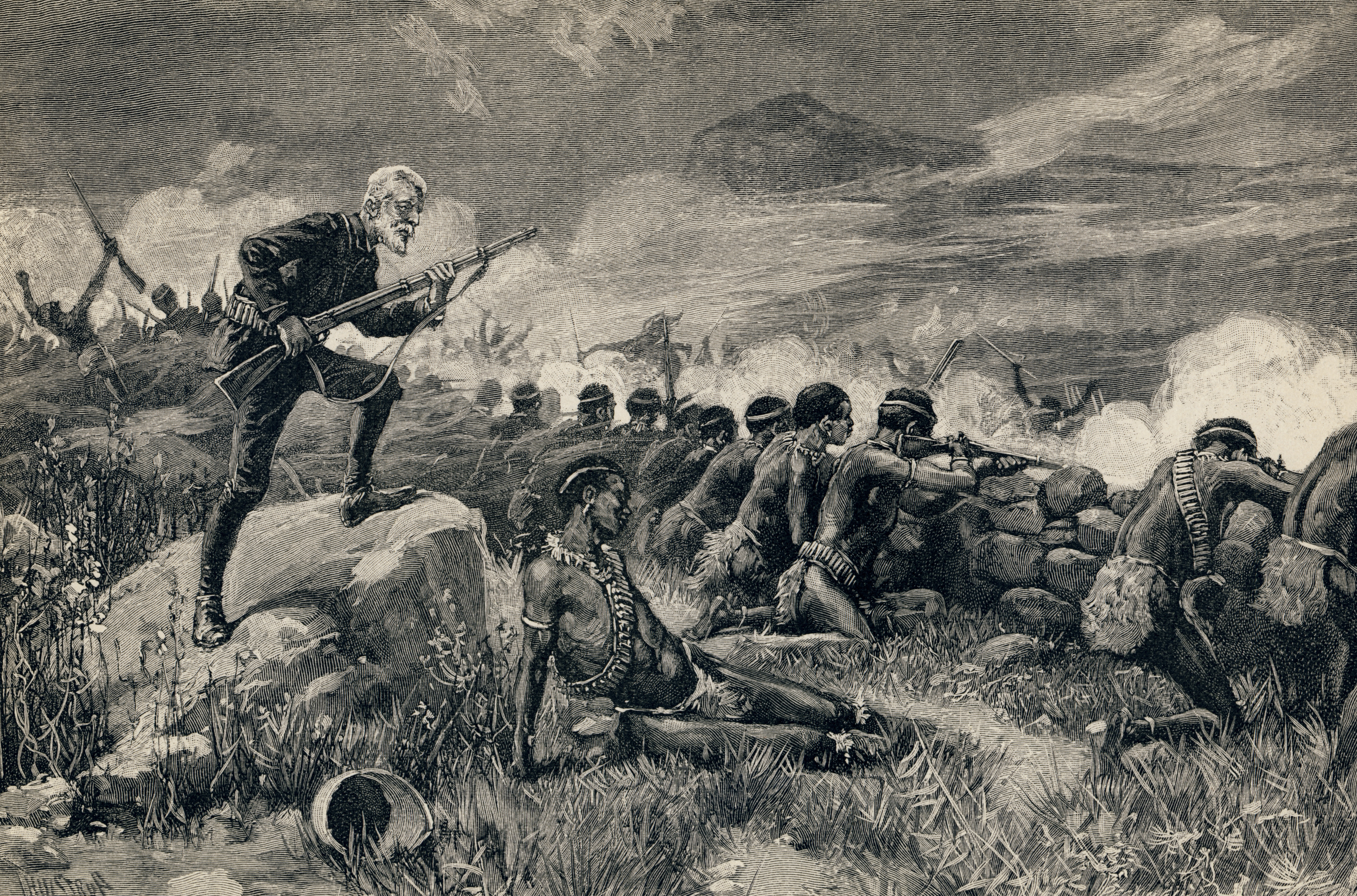
- Illustration from Chapter VII by Thure de Thulstrup
- Author: H. Rider Haggard
- Language: English
- Genre: Adventure novel
- Publication date: 1888
- Publication place: United Kingdom
- Preceded by: "A Tale of Three Lions"
- Followed by: "Hunter Quatermain's Story"

Maiwa's Revenge, or The War of the Little Hand is a short novel by English writer H. Rider Haggard published in 1888 about the hunter Allan Quatermain. The story involves Quatermain going on a hunting expedition, then taking part in an attack on a native kraal to rescue a captured English hunter and avenge Maiwa, an African princess whose baby has been killed. It is the third novel and sixth overall story in the Allan Quatermain series.
