= Nada the Lily =

1892 novel by Henry Rider Haggard

- First edition (damaged copy)
- Author: H. Rider Haggard
- Language: English
- Subject: Zulu people
- Genre: Historical, adventure, fantasy
- Publisher: Longmans, Green and Co.
- Publication date: 1892
- Publication place: United Kingdom
- Pages: 295
- Preceded by: Wisdom's Daughter (internal chronology); Allan's Wife (publication order)
- Followed by: Marie (internal chronology); Black Heart and White Heart (publication order)

Nada the Lily is a historical novel by English writer H. Rider Haggard, published in 1892. Inspired by Haggard's time in South Africa (1875–82). It was illustrated by Charles H. M. Kerr.

The novel tells the tale of the origin and early life of the hero Umslopogaas, the unacknowledged son of the great Zulu king and general Chaka, and his love for "the most beautiful of Zulu women", Nada the Lily. Chaka was a real king of the Zulus but Umslopogaas was invented by Haggard. He first appeared as an elderly but vigorous warrior in Allan Quatermain (1887). He also appears in the novel She and Allan (1921).

Nada the Lily is unusual for a Victorian novel in that its entire cast of characters is South African and black. Nada the Lily features magic and ghosts as part of its plot.

There is some anecdotal evidence that Umslopogaas might have been based on an actual person, although not as described in the book. He would have been a Swazi not a Zulu.

== Plot outline ==
The frame story of Nada the Lily introduces an unnamed "White Man" travelling through Natal "during the winter before the Zulu War." Snow causes him to take shelter at the kraal of a blind and very elderly witch-doctor called Zweete. The White Man stays at the kraal of Zweete for many nights, during which, over a fire, the aged man tells him the tale which comprises the novel.

Nada the Lily is set at the time of Chaka, the Zulu king, around whom much of the action turns, but essentially the book is the story of Umslopogaas, and of "his love for Nada, the most beautiful of Zulu women." They have been brought up as brother and sister but Umslopogaas is really Chaka's son. It is narrated by Mopo the father of Nada and witch doctor to Chaka, whom Chaka had vowed never to slay because he saved the life of Chaka and his mother when they were outcast wanderers.

During the course of the novel Umslopogaas allies with Galazi the Wolf, who lives on Ghost Mountain and commands a hyena pack. The story ends tragically when Nada, fleeing Dingaan's attack on Umslopogaas' kraal, takes refuge in a cave on the mountain. Galazi dies fighting Dingaan's men - Umslopogaas, too, nearly dies in the fighting - but the cave proves Nada's tomb as she is unable to open the stone door she closed behind her. Mopo and Umslopogaas avenge themselves by killing Dingaan.

== Historical basis ==
Parts of the story are closely based on actual historical events and on folktales recorded by Bishop Henry Callaway and others. 'Mopo' is based in part on a man called Mbopa who was involved in the assassination of Shaka; however Umslopogaas, Galazi and Nada are wholly invented characters.

The real-life Zulu kings Shaka and Dingane are major characters and the book is set around the time of real events such as the assassination of Shaka, the Weenen Massacre (the subject of Haggard's later novel Marie), the Battle of Italeni, the Battle of Blood River and the coming to power of Mpande kaSenzangakhona (Panda), the third king of the Zulus.

== Cultural influence ==
Nada is an Arabic word for the dewdrops in the morning and, as such, a poetic metaphor for the concept of generosity, another possible translation of the same word.

It is also probable that the name is a reference to the Portuguese word meaning "nothing" because Haggard was introduced to that idiom while living in South Africa.

== Reception ==
E. F. Bleiler praised Nada the Lily. Bleiler said the novel was "generally considered to be Haggard's finest work, a sustained, tragic story. While Nada is a sop to the romantic market, the remainder of the book is powerful, imaginative, and filled with cultural detail". John Scarborough included Nada on a list of what he regarded as Haggard's best novels, along with King Solomon's Mines, She: A History of Adventure, Cleopatra, Red Eve, and Eric Brighteyes.

== Literary Influence ==
The Lesotho writer Thomas Mofolo was influenced by Nada the Lily when writing his own novel of Zulu life, Chaka (1925).
