= Louis Gompertz =

British writer (1886–1951)

'Martin Louis Alan Gompertz
- Born: 23 February 1886; India
- Died: 29 September 1951 (aged 65)
- Occupations: Novelist, writer, soldier
- Writing career
- Period: 20th century
- Genres: Adventure, sci-fi
- Subjects: India, Asia
- Notable works: Harilek, The Three R's

Martin Louis Alan Gompertz (23 February 1886 – 29 September 1951) was a British soldier and writer, born in India, also known by the pseudonym of 'Ganpat', which was the nearest his Indian troops could get to pronouncing 'Gompertz'. Ganpat is another name for the elephant god Ganesh. He started his writing career with articles for Blackwood's Magazine on his service in East Africa during the First World War. He wrote many adventure stories in the style of H. Rider Haggard, though most of Ganpat's stories are set in the Himalayas. He was an Anglo Indian soldier, and his stories reflect his military and frontier background. He retired in 1939 with the rank of Brigadier, ending his days in the town of Chagford, on the edge of Dartmoor, where he could pursue his passion for fishing.

== Works ==
His books include the following titles:

- Dainra
- Fairy Silver
- Harilek
- High Snow
- The Marches of Honour
- Mirror of Dreams
- The One-Eyed Knave
- Out of Evil
- Roads of Peace
- The Second Tigress
- Seven Times Proven
- The Sleepy Duke (Historical Novel of the Plantaganets)
- The Snow Falcon
- Snow Rubies
- The Speakers in Silence
- Stella Nash
- The Three R's (Science Fiction)
- The Voice of Dashin
- Walls Have Eyes.(Science Fiction)
- The War Breakers
- Wrexham's Romance

He also wrote two travel books on Ladakh, the Tibetan enclave in North-West Kashmir, "The Road to Lamaland" and "Magic Ladakh", as well as a travel brochure titled, "The North-West Frontier of India" for the Indian State Railways. Having served as a captain in the 108th Infantry of the British Indian Army, Gompertz also wrote, "The Indian Army Quartermaster's Manual", published in 1914.
