= The Yellow God =

1908 novel by H. Rider Haggard

The Yellow God: An Idol of Africa
- First edition (UK), second impression
- Author: H. Rider Haggard
- Language: English
- Publisher: Cassell (UK); Cupples & Leon (US)
- Publication date: 1908
- Publication place: United Kingdom

The Yellow God: An Idol of Africa is a 1908 novel by H Rider Haggard.

== Reception ==
E. F. Bleiler wrote that The Yellow God was "Not one of Haggard's better works".
