= William Bury Westall =

English novelist (1834–1903)

William Bury Westall (7 February 1834 – 1903) was an English novelist born in Old Accrington, Lancashire, England.

Originally a businessman, he later became a journalist who also wrote about 30 pot-boiler romantic novels with titles including The Old Factory, The Phantom City: A Volcanic Romance, Strange Crimes and Her Ladyship's Secret. Among his novels are Her Two Millions (1897) with its autobiographical element and descriptions of how a Swiss newspaper is run (Westall worked as an editor of Swiss Times); and Birch Dene (1889) which contains portraits of London and is evocative of the Industrial Revolution.
