= Elissa (book) =

1900 novel by H. Rider Haggard

Elissa, or The Doom of Zimbabwe
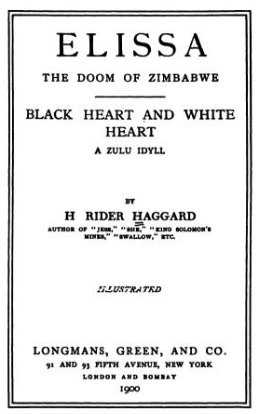
- Title page for Elissa, or The Doom of Zimbabwe (1900)
- Author: H. Rider Haggard
- Language: English
- Genre: Adventure novel
- Publication date: 1900
- Publication place: United Kingdom

Elissa is a 1900 novel by English author H. Rider Haggard. It consists of two stories:

- Elissa; or The Doom of Zimbabwe
- Black Heart and White Heart: A Zulu Idyll

== Reception ==
The Outlook, reviewing Elissa, stated "As a story the tale is somewhat overwritten and improbable".
