= The Ivory Child =

1916 novel by H. Rider Haggard

- First edition (UK)
- Author: H. Rider Haggard
- Cover artist: A. C. Michael
- Language: English
- Series: Allan Quatermain
- Publisher: Cassell (UK); Longmans Green (US)
- Publication date: 1916
- Publication place: United Kingdom
- Preceded by: The Treasure of the Lake
- Followed by: Finished

The Ivory Child is a novel by H. Rider Haggard featuring Allan Quatermain. It is the eighth Quatermain novel, and the twelfth Quatermain story overall.

== Plot ==
While Quatermain visits Lord Ragnall, two foreigners come asking for Macumazana—that is, asking for Allan Quatermain by the name he used among the Africans. The two visitors are Harut and Marut, priests and doctors of the White Kendah People and they have come to ask Allan Quatermain for his help. The White Kendah People are at war with the Black Kendah People who have an evil spirit for a god. And that spirit of the god resides in the largest elephant they have ever seen, an elephant that no man can kill—save Allan Quatermain. And now our intrepid hero must return to Africa and destroy this evil spirit before it kills every one of the White Kendah People.

== Themes ==
The novel is the first in which Haggard deals with the theme of a person who loses his memory after a shocking event and then recovers it after a similar event.

== Reception ==
E. F. Bleiler stated that although The Ivory Child had a similar plot to other Haggard novels, "the incidents are well-handled and the power of Fate is well indicated."

== Influence ==
The Ivory Child is perhaps the earliest example of the idea of the elephant graveyard being used in fiction.
