= Smith and the Pharaohs =

Collection of stories by H. Rider Haggard

Smith and the Pharaohs, and Other Tales
- First publication of title story
- Author: H. Rider Haggard
- Language: English
- Publisher: J.W. Arrowsmith Ltd (UK); Longman Green (US)
- Publication date: 1921
- Publication place: United Kingdom

Smith and the Pharaohs, and Other Tales is a collection of stories by H. Rider Haggard. The title story was serialized in Strand Magazine, between December 1912 and February 1913. Others in the collection included:

- "Magepa the Buck" – an Allan Quatermain short story, the ninth in the series
- "The Blue Curtains"
- "Little Flower"
- "Only a Dream"
- "Barbara Who Came Back"
