= Ayesha (novel) =

1905 novel by H. Rider Haggard

- First edition cover pub. by "Ward Lock"
- Author: H. Rider Haggard
- Language: English
- Series: Ayesha Series
- Genre: Fantasy, Adventure novel
- Publisher: Ward Lock
- Publication date: 1905
- Publication place: United Kingdom
- Media type: Print (hardback & paperback)
- Pages: 384 pp
- ISBN: 978-1515054283
- Preceded by: Allan Quatermain

Ayesha, the Return of She is a gothic-fantasy novel by the English Victorian author H. Rider Haggard, published in 1905 as a sequel to his 1887 novel She. Chronologically, it is the final novel of the Ayesha and Allan Quatermain series. It was serialised in issues 120 (December 1904) to 130 (October 1905) of the Windsor Magazine, where it was illustrated by Maurice Greiffenhagen.

In his introduction to the novel, Haggard links the name Ayesha to the Arabic name of Muhammad's third wife (عائشة, ʿĀʾisha), stating that it should be pronounced "Assha" (i.e. /ˈɑːʃə/ AH-shə), although the pronunciation "A·ye·sha" (/ɑːˈjɛʃə/ ah-YESH-ə or /ɑːˈjiːʃə/ ah-YEE-shə) is more common.

Along with the other three novels in the series, Ayesha, the Return of She was adapted into the 1935 film She.

== Synopsis ==
In the prologue the book's anonymous "Editor" receives a parcel. Opening it, he finds a letter from Horace Holly, with an enclosed manuscript containing a second memoir about She. There is also a second letter, from Holly's doctor, to whom Holly has entrusted his letter and manuscript, along with a wooden box, which contains an ancient sistrum. The doctor recounts how, when attending Holly in his last hours, he arrived at the house to find that Holly had risen from his deathbed and made his way to a local ring of ancient standing stones. Following him, the doctor glimpsed a manifestation that appears to Holly, but as the vision vanished, Holly had let out a happy cry and died.

The narrative of Holly's manuscript begins nearly twenty years after his first adventure in Africa. Holly and his ward Leo Vincey are convinced that Ayesha did not die. Following their dreams, they wander for years through Asia, eventually coming to "Thibet" (as it is spelled in the book). Taking refuge over winter in a remote lamasery, they meet the old Abbot Kou-En, who claims to recall a past-life encounter with a witch queen from the time of Alexander the Great. The Abbot tries to dissuade them from going on and warns them that, however beautiful, nothing is immortal. He believes the Queen is holding on to the distractions of life, which will lead them away from peace of mind.

Despite the Abbot's warning, Leo is compelled to press on and Holly will not abandon his adopted son. When spring breaks, they travel out into the uncharted region beyond the monastery; after a perilous journey and many narrow escapes, they arrive in the city of Kaloon, which is ruled by the evil Khan Rassen and his imperious wife, the Khania Atene, who claim to be descendants of Alexander the Great's ancient Hellenist generals. The people of Kaloon live under an uneasy truce with the people who serve the Hesea, the Priestess of Hes, who dwells on the Mountain, a huge volcano that dominates the region, at the summit of which is a massive natural rock formation in the shape of an ankh. Atene declares her love for Leo, but the jealous and dissolute Rassen (who has been driven mad by the sorcery of Atene and her uncle, the wizard Simbri) wants to kill them.

Atene's rival, the mysterious Hesea, orders Atene to send Leo and Holly to her, or risk breaking their peace treaty. Atene vows to kill Leo, rather than let him go, but with the help of Rassen, they escape the city. They soon realise that Rassen has betrayed them and is hunting them with his monstrous Death-Hounds. They make a dash to the foot of the mountain, where they are caught by Rassen, but after a desperate struggle they manage to kill the Khan and his hounds.

First edition illustration of Ayesha

As Leo and Holly ascend the Mountain they are intercepted by the people of Hes, who are then joined by a ghost-like Messenger, who leads them up the mountain. After they arrive at the vast temple-palace complex near the summit, they are taken into the presence of the veiled Hesea, who admits that she is the Messenger who guided them up the Mountain.

In accordance with ancient custom, Atene comes to the mountain temple for the funeral of Rassen. The Hesea now declares that she is indeed the reincarnation of Ayesha, and that Atene is the reincarnation of her ancient rival, Amenartas. To the horror of Leo and Holly, Ayesha reveals she has been reborn into the body of a wizened old crone. Atene challenges Ayesha, but Leo declares his love for Ayesha, regardless of the form in which she appears. With his choice, the mysterious life-force within the volcano reaches out and engulfs her – when it clears, her former beauty and majesty has been restored.

Ayesha vows that if Leo still loves her, they will return to her ancient home in Africa. There they will both bathe in the Flame of Life, become immortal, and rule the world together. However she refuses Leo's entreaties to marry him right away, saying that they must wait for the change of seasons and the weather to clear, before they can travel.

While waiting out the winter, Ayesha writes her memories (which are the basis for the fourth book in the series, Wisdom's Daughter). Ayesha shows Holly and Leo how she commands mortals, spirits, and demons. She questions Holly at length about the modern world and expounds to him her plan that, once united with Leo, they will rule the world, conquering the existing Empires by flooding the world's gold supply with her alchemy. Appalled, Holly fears that Ayesha may succeed.

Leo presses Ayesha to marry him without delay, but she is unwilling, insisting they must wait. Bored with his confinement, Leo goes hunting in the mountains but Ayesha, fearful for his safety, uses her psychic powers to watch him and sees that he and his men have been attacked by a leopard, and that Leo has been injured. When the party returns, the furious Ayesha sentences Leo's retainers to death, but Leo is horrified by her cruelty and prevails on her to spare them.

Soon after, Atene sends Ayesha an ultimatum, challenging her to battle. Ayesha marshalls her forces and marches out, but while they are camped at the foot of the mountain, Atene uses her magic to appear in the guise of Ayesha, luring Holly and Leo away from Ayesha's protection, and Leo is captured.

Enraged, Ayesha declares that she will destroy Atene and rescue Leo. Although greatly outnumbered, she leads her men into battle, and when the two armies meet Ayesha reveals her power over the elements, summoning up a terrible lightning storm. In the ensuing holocaust, Ayesha obliterates Atene's army and lays waste to Kaloon, while her own army reaches the city without the loss of a single man.

When Ayesha and Holly burst into the room where Leo is confined, they discover that Atene has realised her utter defeat and taken poison. They see the wizard Simbri standing poised to kill Leo, but Ayesha paralyses him with her power, and Leo is released unharmed. Leo demands that Ayesha must give herself to him immediately, and she yields to his wish. They kiss, but Ayesha's power proves too great for his mortal body, and he dies in her arms. Ayesha then charges the wizard Simbri to go ahead into the realm of Death and carry a message to the departed spirits, and with these words Simbri falls dead where he stands. The distraught Ayesha takes Leo's body to the temple on the peak, where the flames rise up from the crater and consume their bodies. Holly is led down from the mountain and finds his way back to the lamasery.

== Literary history ==
Haggard dedicated the novel to his friend Andrew Lang. Eighteen years pass between books, and in the characters' lives.

It is set in Central Asia – partly in Tibet – reincarnation being a familiar tenet of Tibetan Buddhism; however, the back story is set in the ancient Mediterranean.

In her biography of her father Haggard's daughter Lilias Rider Haggard explains the origins of the names. "She-Who-Must-Be-Obeyed" was a doll in the author's nursery. "Ayesha" was borrowed from Arabic, being the name of one of Mohammed's wives.

In this book Haggard explains the origins of the "rolling Pillar of Life", which he associates to effects of radiation:

Recent discoveries would appear to suggest that this mysterious "Fire of Life", which, whatever else it may have been, was evidently a force and no true fire, since it did not burn, owed its origin to the emanations from radium, or some kindred substance. Although in the year 1885, Mr. Holly would have known nothing of the properties of these marvellous rays or emanations, doubtless Ayesha was familiar with them and their enormous possibilities, of which our chemists and scientific men have, at present, but explored the fringe.

== Influences ==
Ayesha is mentioned by Freud in The Interpretation of Dreams and by Jung in a lecture, "The Spirit in Man, Art, and Literature".

== Sources ==
- Bleiler, Everett (1948). The Checklist of Fantastic Literature. Chicago: Shasta Publishers. p. 136.
