= Allan Quatermain (novel) =

1887 novel by H. Rider Haggard

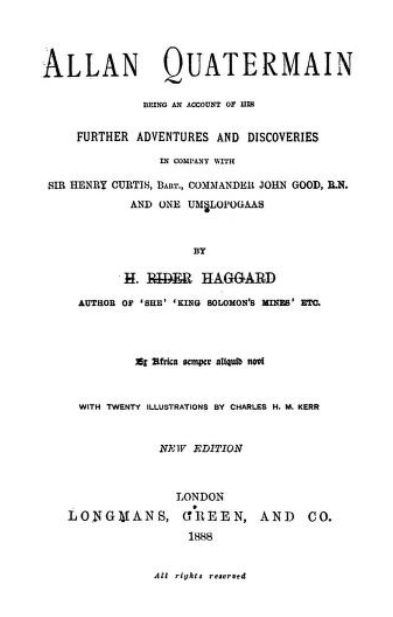
- Title page for Allan Quatermain (1888)
- Author: Sir H. Rider Haggard
- Series: Allan Quatermain
- Genre: Adventure novel
- Publication date: 1887
- Publication place: United Kingdom
- Preceded by: Allan and the Ice-gods
- Followed by: Ayesha: The Return of She
- Text: Allan Quatermain at Wikisource

Allan Quatermain is an 1887 novel by H. Rider Haggard. It is the sequel to Haggard's 1885 novel King Solomon's Mines. Allan Quatermain is the second novel and fourth overall story in the eighteen-part series of the same name, though chronologically it is the final entry.

== Background ==
Haggard wrote the book over his summer holiday in 1885 immediately after King Solomon's Mines. It was first serialised in Longman's Magazine before being published.

== Plot summary ==
At the beginning of the book, Allan Quatermain's only son has died and he longs to get back into the wilderness. He persuades Sir Henry Curtis, Captain John Good, and the Zulu chief Umslopogaas to accompany him, and they set out from the coast of east Africa into the territory of the Maasai. While staying with a Scottish missionary, Mr. Mackenzie, they run into a group of Maasai who kidnap Mr. Mackenzie's daughter. The Maasai demand the life of one of the party as ransom, but instead they lead an attack on the Maasai, catching them by surprise and slaughtering them. The group then travel by canoe along an underground river to a lake (which turns out to be the sacred lake of Zu-Vendis) in the kingdom of Zu-Vendis beyond a range of mountains. The Zu-Vendi are a warlike race of white-skinned people isolated from other African races; their capital is called Milosis. At the time of the British party's arrival, they are ruled jointly by two sisters, Nyleptha and Sorais. The priests of the Zu-Vendi religion are hostile to the explorers, as they had killed hippopotamuses – animals sacred to the Zu-Vendis – on their arrival, but the queens protect them.

Both sisters fall passionately in love with Curtis, but Curtis loves only Nyleptha. Together with Nyleptha's rejection of the nobleman Nasta, the lord of a highland domain, a civil war breaks out. Sorais' and Nasta's forces fight against those of Nyleptha, Curtis and Quatermain. After a battle in which Queen Nyleptha's forces emerge victorious despite being outnumbered, it turns out that Queen Nyleptha is threatened by the treachery of the priests, who plan to murder her in her palace before her army's return. Umslopogaas and one loyal warrior manage to save her by defending the main doorway of the palace while killing the attackers, including Nasta and the chief priest Agon, although both are mortally wounded. Defeated and jealous, Sorais takes her own life. Nyleptha and Curtis become queen and king, while Quatermain dies from a wound suffered in the battle.

== Reception ==
The book Science-Fiction: The Early Years said about Allan Quatermain that the book was "one of Haggard's most successful works" and "the lost-race novel par excellence, setting up many of the motifs and fictional patterns that became an integral part of the subgenre".

== Adaptations ==
King Solomon's Mines and Allan Quatermain were adapted into the film King Solomon's Treasure. Allan Quatermain was also adapted into the film Allan Quatermain and the Lost City of Gold.
