= She and Allan =

1921 novel by H. Rider Haggard

- First edition (UK)
- Author: H. Rider Haggard
- Illustrator: Enos B. Comstock (frontispiece)
- Series: Allan Quatermain; Ayesha (or "She")
- Genre: Fantasy
- Publisher: Hutchinson & Co (UK); Longman, Green & Co. (US)
- Publication date: 1921
- Publication place: United Kingdom
- Media type: Print (hardcover)
- Pages: 392
- Preceded by: Heu-heu: or, The Monster
- Followed by: The Treasure of the Lake

She and Allan is a novel by H. Rider Haggard, first published in 1921. It brought together his two most popular characters, Ayesha from his 1887 novel She (to which it serves as a prequel), and Allan Quatermain from his 1885 novel King Solomon's Mines. Umslopogaas from Nada the Lily (1892) also appears in the novel as a major character. It is the third of four stories featuring the character Ayesha (pronounced “Assha” according to the author) and the fifteenth in the Quatermain series.

She and Allan, along with the other stories in the series, was adapted into the 1935 film She.

The novel was republished by the Newcastle Publishing Company as the sixth volume of the Newcastle Forgotten Fantasy Library series in September 1975.

== Plot summary ==
Wanting to learn if he can communicate with deceased loved ones, adventurer and trader Allan Quatermain seeks a meeting with the feared Zulu witch-doctor Zikali, who tells Allan to seek out a great white sorceress who rules a hidden kingdom far to the north, and he charges Allan to take a message to her. He also gives Allan a necklace with a strange amulet, carved in Zikali's own likeness. Zikali claims it has great magical powers that will protect Allan on his journey, but he must on no account take it off.

Allan is initially scornful of Zikali's claims, and sets off for the coast, but a series of odd events force him to go north in spite of his own wishes. On the journey he encounters Umslopogaas, a fearsome Zulu warrior chieftain. Umslopogaas tells Allan that he has discovered that he is about to be deposed and murdered, so he decides to leave his village and accompany Allan on his quest. Allan is again sceptical, but a few days later Umslopogaas and his band of warriors meet up with Allan's party, and Umslopogaas cements their friendship when he saves Allan from being killed by a lion.

Journeying into unknown country, they come to a remote settlement called "Strathmuir" run by a Scot, Robertson, a drunkard and former sea captain, who lives there with his beautiful daughter Inez. Her Portuguese mother had died years earlier and her father has now taken native wives and sired several children with them. A few days later, Robertson takes Allan on an expedition to hunt hippopotamus, but as they return they are intercepted by Allan's servant, Hans, who had stayed behind. He reports that, in their absence, Strathmuir has been attacked by a band of cannibal warriors from the north, who have killed and eaten many of the villagers (including Robertson's wives and children) and kidnapped Inez.

Allan, Robertson and Umslopogaas set off in pursuit. At one point they catch up to the cannibals, and Allan and Hans almost succeed in freeing Inez, but her servant panics and alerts their captors, who escape. They track the cannibals through the treacherous swampland that surrounds the lost kingdom of Kôr, and as they approach the great mountain the cannibals turn and attack Allan's group, but they are driven off by the arrival of Bilali, the servant of Ayesha, who tells that She has been expecting them, and that he is to bring them into her presence.

Allan is summoned to meet Ayesha, who is camped among the ruins of the ancient city of Kôr. Ayesha remains veiled, although she briefly reveals herself to him, but in spite of her allure, he manages to resist her power, and throughout the story he remains sceptical of her claims that she is immortal and has supernatural powers.

Some days later Robertson disappears from the camp to seek out the rebel Armahagger who are holding Inez captive, hoping to rescue his daughter and, if possible, to kill their chief, the dreaded Rezu, who is also rumoured to be immortal. Allan and Hans learn that this rebel group are the descendants of an ancient sun-worshipping cult who perform human sacrifice, and that Inez will be married to Rezu and installed as Queen of all the Armahagger if they defeat Ayesha.

Knowing that Rezu is preparing to attack and try to overthrow her, Ayesha seeks help from Allan and Umslopogaas in the coming battle, asking Allan to lead the army of Kôr. He reluctantly agrees, but when Ayesha brings him before her generals, they at first refuse to accept him, until he displays the "Great Medicine", the amulet given to him by Zikali. Though outnumbered three-to-one, Allan draws up plans that he hopes will give Ayesha's army a tactical advantage, but he has little confidence in her Armahagger soldiers. As they advance, Hans scouts ahead; he discovers that Inez's unfortunate servant has already been eaten, and that the rebels have captured Robertson and intend to sacrifice him and eat him before his daughter's eyes. Soon after, a Zulu scout returns to warn that some of Ayesha's soldiers are spies for Rezu, and that the enemy having found out their plans have set an ambush just ahead. Allan quickly draws his men into a defensive square just before Rezu's forces attack; they hold their ground against the first two waves, but the square breaks under a third onslaught. Allan fears all is lost, but at that moment a glowing apparition of Ayesha appears in their midst, bearing a wand, and she moves forward towards Rezu's soldiers, who become paralysed as she advances. Heartened, the Kôr soldiers surge forward, slaughtering most of Rezu's army.

As they reach the enemy camp, they see Rezu kill the helpless Robertson with an axe. They now confront the fearsome Rezu himself, a huge, bearded giant seven feet tall; Allan fires two heavy-gauge bullets, which hit Rezu, but they have no effect, and they realise he is heavily armoured. Now Umslopogaas steps forward and challenges Rezu to single combat. A desperate struggle ensues, and although Umslopogaas carries an ancient axe rumoured to be the only weapon that can kill Rezu, he makes no impression against Rezu's heavy armour. Finally Umslopogaas employs a ruse – he appears to flee, enabling him to reach higher ground, from which he makes a rapid run towards Rezu. Leaping into the air, he strikes Rezu down from behind with a mighty blow as he vaults over the giant's head. Ayesha's soldiers then surge forward and, before Allan can examine him, they hack Rezu's body to pieces. Allan and Hans now race to the tent where Inez is being held; she seems drugged or catatonic, and as they enter the handmaidens who guard her all commit suicide, and Inez is freed.

The day after the battle, Allan and Hans watch from a distance as Ayesha addresses her surviving troops and punishes the captured traitors. As she speaks, a fierce storm blows up, and lightning flashes around Ayesha and the captives, but it leaves the faithful soldiers unharmed. When the storm clears, Ayesha has vanished, and when they move forward to examine the captives, they find them dead, although their bodies are quite unmarked.

The next night Ayesha summons Allan to receive his reward. He balks at fulfilling his wish to see if his loved ones survive beyond the grave, but Ayesha takes control and her power paralyses him; he feels himself dying and his spirit moving into another realm. He sees visions of his family, but their spirits seem unaware of his presence; only the spirits of a faithful dog and an African woman whom he had loved seem aware of him and able to communicate with him. When he revives, Ayesha questions him but, despite his experience, he remains profoundly sceptical and he argues with Ayesha over what has transpired. Later that night Allan meets up with Umslopogaas, who tells him of his own experiences.

By now Inez has fully recovered from her ordeal although, as Ayesha had predicted, she remembers nothing of her traumatic experience or her father's death. Allan and Umslopogaas have no desire to remain, so Ayesha arranges for the surviving members of the party to be escorted back to Strathmuir. We learn that Inez never recovers her memory of what had transpired, and she is never told the truth; she eventually retires to a convent. Umslopogaas returns to his people to face his destiny, and Allan returns to Zululand to deliver Ayesha's message to Zikali.

== Reception ==
E. F. Bleiler lauded She and Allan, describing the novel as "an imaginative, entertaining adventure story."

== Sources ==
- Bleiler, Everett (1948). The Checklist of Fantastic Literature. Chicago: Shasta Publishers. pp. 137.
- Salmonson, Jessica Amanda. "An Annotated Bibliography of H. Rider Haggard's Fantasies in 1st Editions, Alphabetically Arranged". Archived from the original on 22 May 2007.
- Tuck, Donald H. (1974). The Encyclopedia of Science Fiction and Fantasy. Chicago: Advent. p. 199. ISBN 0-911682-20-1.
