= Sir Henry Curtis =

Fictional character in a series of adventure novels by H. Rider Haggard

Sir Henry Curtis is a fictional character in a series of adventure novels by H. Rider Haggard. His Zulu name is Incubu, which means "Elephant". He is the constant companion and fellow traveller of Allan Quatermain.

Sir Henry first became acquainted with Quatermain when he left from England to Natal province, South Africa to request help in search of his brother, George. Although unwilling at first, Quatermain is eventually persuaded to help lead him along with Commander John Good of the Royal Navy to the Heart of Kukuanaland, where George is expected to have disappeared looking for King Solomon's Mines.

Sir Henry is especially noted for his enormous size and stature, his muscular physique, and his long, blond locks, no doubt inherited from his Danish forebears.

Sir Henry is, especially in Kukuanaland, noted for his bravery in battle, such as when he led the Greys, the elite regiment in the Kukuana army, against the king Twala in an unevenly matched battle. After a long day of fighting, he even slays the king himself in hand-to-hand combat. This feat so impressed the natives that any feat of strength afterward in Kukuanaland has been known as Incubu's Blow.
