= The Story of the Glittering Plain =

1891 novel by William Morris

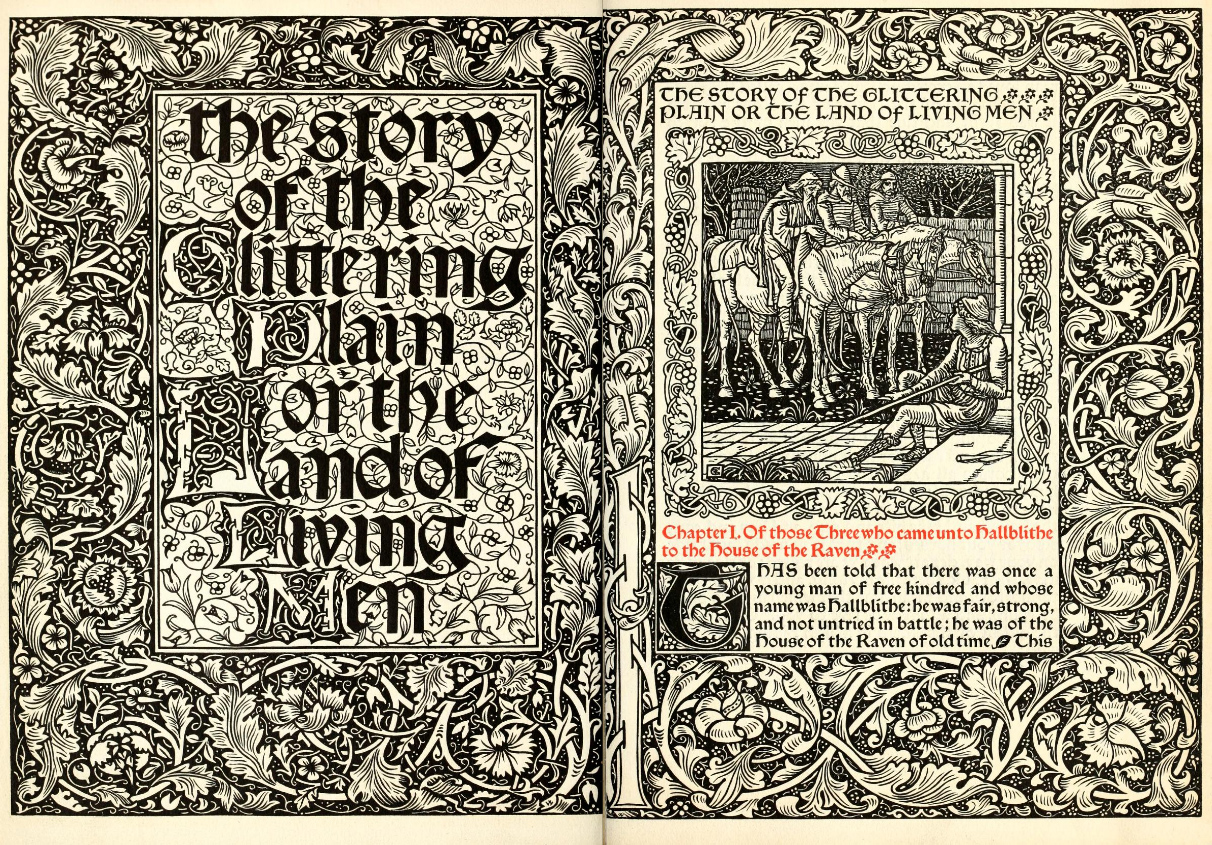
- Author: William Morris
- Illustrator: Walter Crane
- Language: English
- Genre: Fantasy novel
- Publisher: Macmillan/Kelmscott Press
- Publication date: 1890/1891
- Publication place: United Kingdom
- Media type: Print (first published in the English Illustrated Magazine, issued as a book by the Kelmscott Press).

The Story of the Glittering Plain (full title: The Story of the Glittering Plain which has been also called the Land of Living Men or the Acre of the Undying) is an 1891 fantasy novel by William Morris. He was perhaps the first modern fantasy writer to unite an imaginary world with the element of the supernatural. The book is also important for its exploration of the socialist themes that interested Morris.

While Morris is better known today for his work in art and design rather than his writings, he was the precursor of much of present-day fantasy literature. His earlier fantasies The House of the Wolfings and The Roots of the Mountains were to some degree historical novels. Like these The Story of the Glittering Plain is set in a world similar to the distant past of northern Europe. Morris would go on to develop the new genre established in this work in such later fantasies as Child Christopher and Goldilind the Fair, The Wood Beyond the World, The Well at the World's End, and The Water of the Wondrous Isles.

== Plot introduction ==
The Glittering Plain by William Morris, Newcastle Publishing Company, 1973

The book concerns the quest of Hallblithe of the House of the Raven to rescue his fiancée the Hostage, who has been kidnapped by pirates, which ultimately takes him to the utopian Land of the Glittering Plain, also known as the Acre of the Undying or the Land of the Living Men, whose inhabitants are supposedly immortal.

== Publication history ==
First printed in The English Illustrated Magazine, Vol. VII, 1890, the story was printed in book form the following year by the Kelmscott Press, Morris's own newly founded private press.

=== Kelmscott editions ===
The first Kelmscott edition was not illustrated, but used decorated capitals and Morris's "Golden" typeface (after Nicolas Jenson). A second edition appeared in 1894. Morris increased the size of the book from small to large quarto, and changed the typeface to "Troy" (a more Gothic design). Walter Crane supplied illustrations on a profit-sharing basis: these were designed as woodcuts in accordance with Morris's commitment to techniques typical of 15th and 16th-century European book production. Although Crane had trained as a wood engraver, it was agreed that the illustrations could be "cut on wood" by someone else.

The number of copies printed by the Kelmscott Press was small. According to the British Library, which has several copies, the 1894 edition was a "limited ed. of 250 paper copies (priced 5 gns) and 7 vellum copies (£20)".

=== Other editions ===
Although the Kelmscott Press continued in existence until 1898, The Story of the Glittering Plain was, in 1896, transferred to Longmans, Green and Co., a large-scale publisher. It was republished (as The Glittering Plain) by the Newcastle Publishing Company as the first volume of the Newcastle Forgotten Fantasy Library in September, 1973.

=== Copyright ===
The copyright for this story has expired in the United States, and thus now resides in the public domain there. The text is available via Project Gutenberg (transcribed from the 1913 Longmans, Green and Co. edition).
