= William Morris's influence on Tolkien =

Literary influence

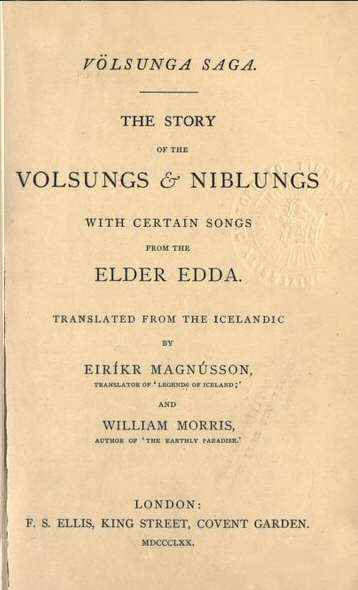
Tolkien read Morris's translation of the Völsunga saga while he was a student.

William Morris's influence on J. R. R. Tolkien was substantial. From an early age, Tolkien bought many of Morris's books, including his fantasies, poetry, and translations. Both men liked the Norse sagas, disliked mechanisation, and wrote fantasy books which they illustrated themselves; both included poems and songs in their books. On the other hand, Morris was a socialist and atheist, while Tolkien was a Catholic.

Scholars have identified multiple elements of Tolkien's fantasy writings that match Morris's writings. These range from general aspects like use of archaism and a medieval setting, to specific features like details of life in a Nordic hall and a savage character who brings the protagonist rabbits.

Morris's influence extends through Tolkien to the Tolkien artist Alan Lee and the filmmaker Peter Jackson. Together, they have spread a medievalist aesthetic to a wide modern fantasy audience.

== Context ==
J. R. R. Tolkien went to Exeter College, Oxford, as William Morris had done. Both men disliked capitalism and industrialisation; and both wrote fiction that proposed an alternative, non-industrial, society. Tolkien followed Morris, too, in the habit of weaving poems, legends, and proverbs into his novels. Tolkien read Beowulf while at school, possibly in Morris and A. J. Wyatt's 1895 translation. Like Morris, he studied Icelandic and became familiar with Norse history and mythology. Both men published translations before writing works of their own. In 1914, Tolkien won the Skeat Prize for English, using the money to buy some of Morris's books including The House of the Wolfings and his prose translation of the Völsunga Saga. Christopher Tolkien stated that his father owned most of Morris's written works, including his fantasies, poetry, and translations.

Timothy Murphy writes that despite the acknowledged influence of Morris on Tolkien, and their shared "dislike of mechanized modernity", the larger picture is of their opposed fantasy legacies. In Murphy's view, the "bourgeois Catholic Tolkien emplifies the idealist or transcendentalist strand" of fantasy, now dominant in the marketplace; while Morris started the "conceptually more fertile strand of materialist fantasy" as seen in the writings of Edith Nesbit, Ursula Le Guin, Michael Moorcock, and China Miéville.

Timothy Murphy's contrast of Morris and Tolkien, and the fantasy they produced
Attribute	William Morris	J. R. R. Tolkien
Like Norse sagas	Medieval theme in their fantasy works	
Dislike "mechanized modernity"	Ruralism in their fantasy works	
Political outlook	Active socialist	Bourgeois, royalist
Religious outlook	Atheist, magic immanent in nature	Devout Catholic
Practical action	Arts and Crafts "to construct a beautiful and invigorating physical environment for the English working class"	
Type of fantasy created	"Materialist"	"Idealist or transcendentalist"
Literary influence	The "fertile" and "innovative" work of William Hope Hodgson, Edith Nesbit, Ursula Le Guin, Michael Moorcock, Samuel R. Delany, and China Miéville	High fantasy, dominating the commercial market

== Völsunga Saga: the story of the Volsungs & Niblungs ==
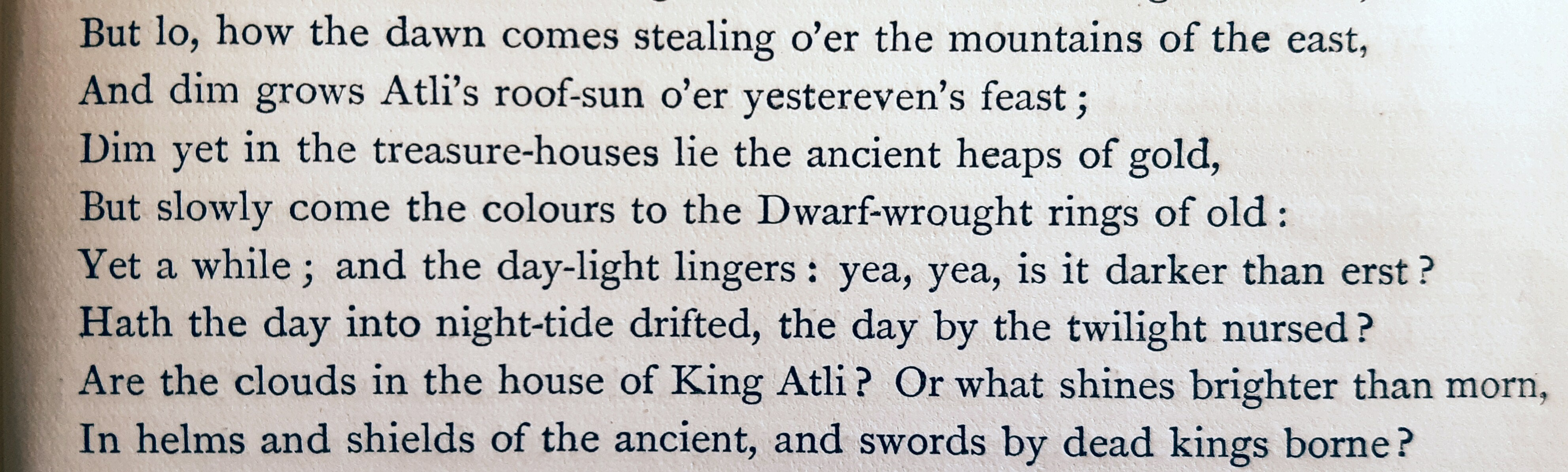
Tolkien was familiar with William Morris's 1876 book-length poem The Story of Sigurd the Volsung and the Fall of the Niblungs. It told (in this extract from page 389) of Dwarf-Rings and swords carried by dead kings.

Tolkien was influenced directly or indirectly by Germanic heroic legend, especially its Norse and Old English forms. During his education at King Edward's School in Birmingham, he read and translated from the Old Norse in his free time. One of his first Norse purchases was the Völsunga saga. While a student, Tolkien read the only available English prose translation, Morris and Eiríkur Magnússon's 1870 Völsunga Saga: the story of the Volsungs & Niblungs, with certain songs from the Elder Edda. The Old Norse Völsunga saga and the Middle High German Nibelungenlied were coeval texts made with the use of the same ancient sources. Both of them provided some of the basis for Richard Wagner's opera series, Der Ring des Nibelungen, featuring in particular a magical but cursed golden ring and a broken sword reforged. In the Völsunga saga, these items are respectively Andvaranaut and Gram, and they correspond broadly to the One Ring and the sword Narsil (reforged as Andúril). In addition, the Völsunga saga contains various names used in Tolkien's legendarium. Among Tolkien's academic works, The Legend of Sigurd and Gudrún discusses the Völsunga saga in relation to the myth of Sigurd and Gudrún.

The Grettis saga calls the undead monsters Glámr and Kárr haugbúar ("mound-dwellers", singular haugbúi; a similar term is draugr). It influenced Tolkien's barrow-wights, whether directly from the Old Norse or by way of Magnússon and Morris's translation, which Tolkien was familiar with.

== Icelandic Journals ==
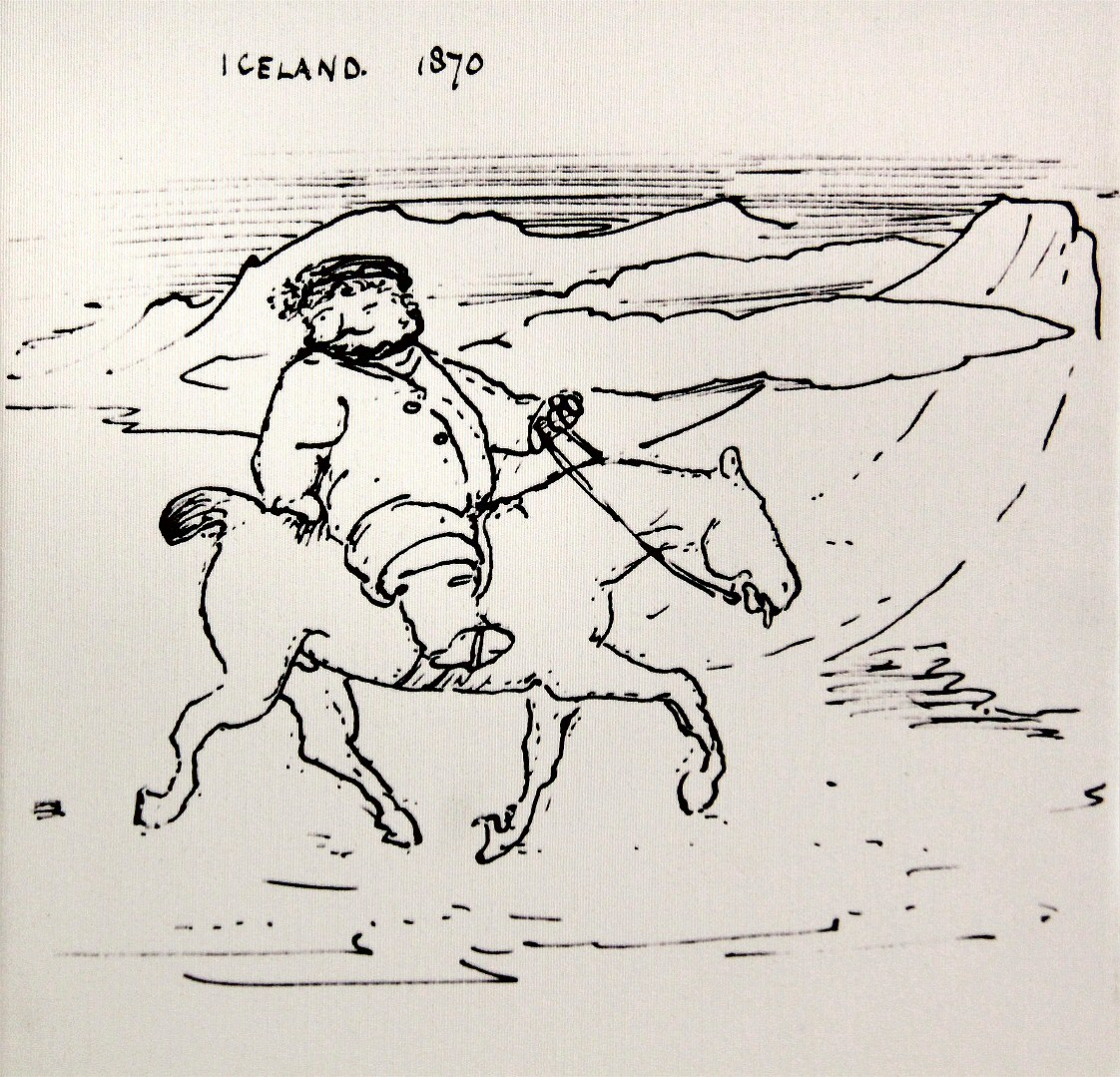
The character and adventures of Bilbo Baggins in The Hobbit match many details of William Morris's expedition in Iceland. 1870 cartoon of Morris riding a pony by his travelling companion Edward Burne-Jones

The general form of The Hobbit—that of a journey into strange lands, told in a light-hearted mood and interspersed with songs—may be following the model of Morris's 1871 The Icelandic Journals.

Tolkien wished to imitate the prose and poetry romances of the 19th-century Arts and Crafts polymath William Morris (Note: Carpenter 2023, #1 to Edith Bratt, October 1914) in style and approach. The Desolation of Smaug, portraying dragons as detrimental to landscape, is a motif explicitly borrowed from Morris.

The medievalist and Tolkien scholar Marjorie Burns writes that Bilbo's character and adventures match many details of Morris's expedition in Iceland. She comments, for instance, that the humorous drawings of Morris riding through the wilds of Iceland in the early 1870s by his friend the artist Edward Burne-Jones can serve well as models for Bilbo on his adventures. Like Bilbo's, Morris's party set off enjoyably into the wild on ponies. He meets a "boisterous" man called "Biorn the boaster" who lives in a hall beside Eyja-fell, and who tells Morris, tapping him on the belly, "... besides, you know you are so fat", just as Beorn pokes Bilbo "most disrespectfully" and compares him to a plump rabbit. Burns notes that Morris was "relatively short, a little rotund, and affectionately called 'Topsy', for his curly mop of hair", all somewhat hobbit-like characteristics. Further, she writes, "Morris in Iceland often chooses to place himself in a comic light and to exaggerate his own ineptitude", just as Morris's companion, the painter Edward Burne-Jones, gently teased his friend by depicting him as very fat in his Iceland cartoons. Burns suggests that these images "make excellent models" for the Bilbo who runs puffing to the Green Dragon inn or "jogs along behind Gandalf and the dwarves" on his quest. Another definite resemblance is the emphasis on home comforts: Morris enjoyed a pipe, a bath, and "regular, well-cooked meals"; Morris looked as out of place in Iceland as Bilbo did "over the Edge of the Wild"; both are afraid of dark caves; and both grow through their adventures.

== Novels and poems ==
=== "Northern elements" ===
Tolkien identified Morris's novels as an influence on The Lord of the Rings in a 1960 letter: (Note: Carpenter 2023, #226 to Professor L. W. Forster, 31 December 1960)

The Dead Marshes and the approaches to the Morannon owe something to northern France after the Battle of the Somme. They owe more to William Morris and his Huns and Romans, as in The House of the Wolfings or The Roots of the Mountains.

Burns writes that several "Northern elements" in Tolkien's Middle-earth writings have "counterparts" in Morris's novels.

Marjorie Burns's analysis of Middle-earth elements matching those in Morris's novels
Northern element	Morris novel
"Germanic battle"	The House of the Wolfings
"Nordic hall life"	The Story of the Glittering Plain
"a hint for Gollum"	The Roots of the Mountains
"Bewilderments of Fangorn Forest"	The Wood Beyond the World
Aragorn, "a prince of all trades"	Ralph, in The Well at the World's End

Tolkien's biographer Humphrey Carpenter wrote that the first draft of The Silmarillion used the literary device of "a sea-voyager arriv[ing] at an unknown land" and hearing a series of stories, just as in Morris's epic poem The Earthly Paradise.

Morris used a great dark forest named Mirkwood in his 1889 novel The House of the Wolfings; Tolkien had forests of the same name in both The Silmarillion (where there are two Mirkwoods) and The Lord of the Rings. The philologist and Tolkien scholar scholar Tom Shippey explains that the name evoked the excitement of the wildness of Europe's ancient North. Tolkien stated in a 1966 letter that he had not invented the name Mirkwood, but that it was "a very ancient name, weighted with legendary associations", and summarized its "Primitive Germanic" origins, its appearance in "very early German" and in Old English, Old Swedish, and Old Norse, and the survival of mirk (a variant of "murk") in modern English. He wrote that "It seemed to me too good a fortune that Mirkwood remained intelligible (with exactly the right tone) in modern English to pass over: whether mirk is a Norse loan or a freshment of the obsolescent O.E. word." (Note: Carpenter 2023, #289 to Michael George Tolkien, 29 July 1966)

The scholar of folklore Dimitra Fimi writes that The Wood Beyond the World strikingly parallels a scene in The Lord of the Rings. In chapter X, Golden Walter meets a "wicked Dwarf" with a "fearful harsh voice". The Dwarf offers Walter some "loathsome bread". To Walter's hesitation, he offers to get him "a coney or a hare", and recalls that the man will not eat it raw, but "must needs half burn it in the fire, or mar it with hot water". Fimi remarks the detailed parallels with the scene in The Two Towers, "Of Herbs and Stewed Rabbit", where Gollum brings rabbits (which Sam calls coneys) for Frodo and Sam. (Note: Tolkien 1954, book 4, ch. 4 "Of Herbs and Stewed Rabbit") Fimi writes that this encounter with savagery serves a structural function in both cases. She notes that scholars such as Andrew Dodds and Hilary Newman have labelled Morris's Dwarf as the protagonist's "darker aspect"; while other scholars, such as the classicist Douglass Parker and the Tolkien scholar Verlyn Flieger, have similarly described Gollum as Frodo's "dark side", i.e. the two are psychologically paired by both Morris and Tolkien.

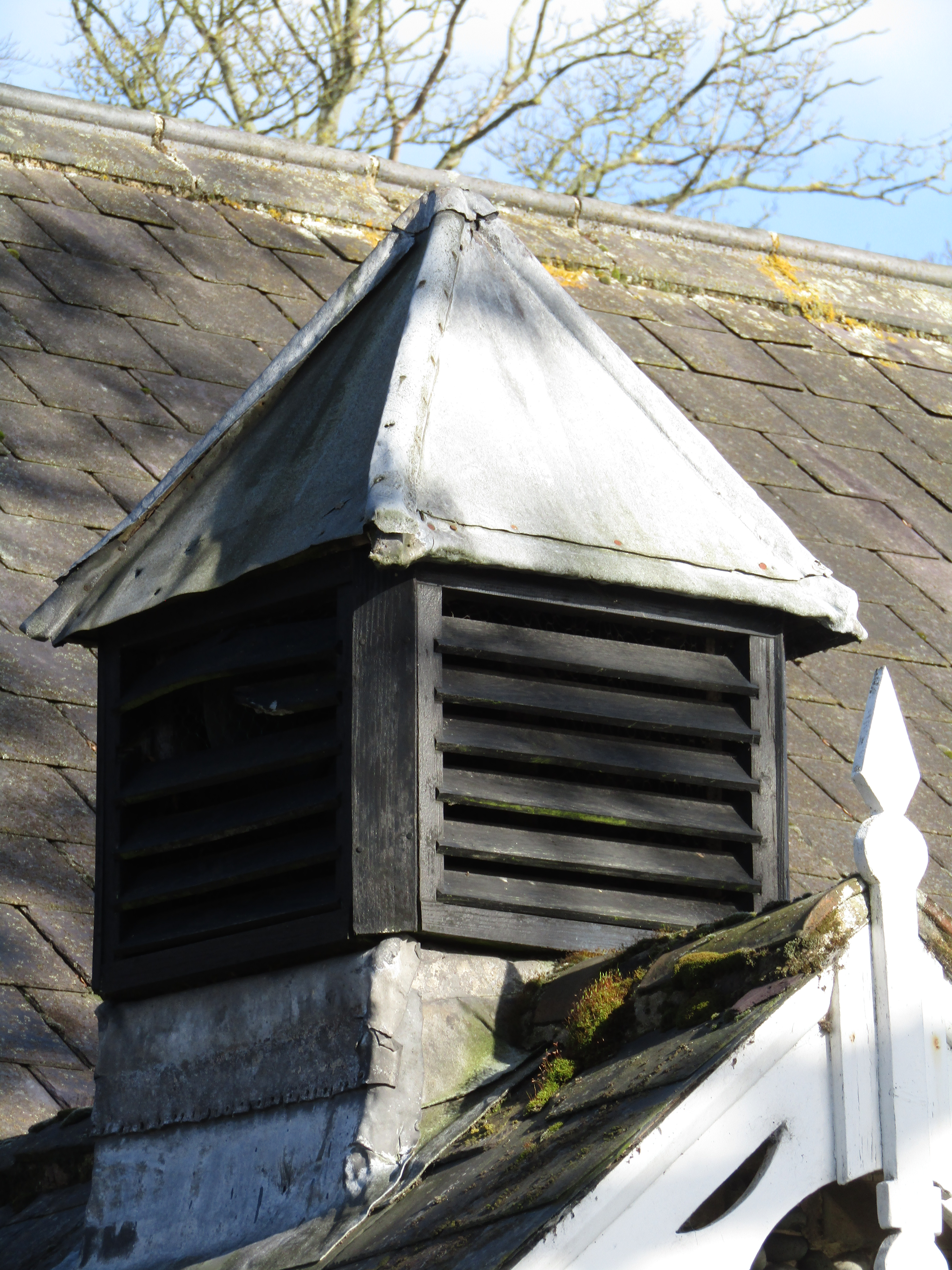
Anachronistic structure: a post-medieval louvre, mentioned by both Morris and Tolkien.

The philologist and Tolkien scholar Tom Shippey writes that the King of Rohan's hall of Meduseld in The Lord of the Rings is anachronistically described as having louvres in its roof to remove the smoke; the word, from French, was first used in English in 1393. The feature is derived directly from The House of the Wolfings, where Morris wrote: (Note: Morris 1904, ch. 1, "The Dwellings of Mid-Mark")

In the aisles were the sleeping-places of the Folk, and down the nave under the crown of the roof were three hearths for the fires, and above each hearth a luffer or smoke-bearer to draw the smoke up when the fires were lighted.

Tolkien's description of the hall runs: (Note: Tolkien 1954, book 3, ch. 6 "The King of the Golden Hall")

But here and there bright sunbeams fell in glimmering shafts from the eastern windows, high under the deep eaves. Through the louvre in the roof, above the thin wisps of issuing smoke, the sky showed pale and blue.

Tommy Kuusela suggests that Morris's 1896 fantasy novel The Well at the World's End may have influenced The Lord of the Rings. Parallels include "King Gandolf" (Tolkien's Gandalf), and a quick, white horse named "Silverfax" (Tolkien's Shadowfax).

=== The Roots of the Mountains ===
Kelvin Lee Massey analyses the influence of Morris's 1889 romance The Roots of the Mountains on The Lord of the Rings. Parallels include the novel's intentionally archaic diction and syntax, elements of the plot, and descriptions of landscape.

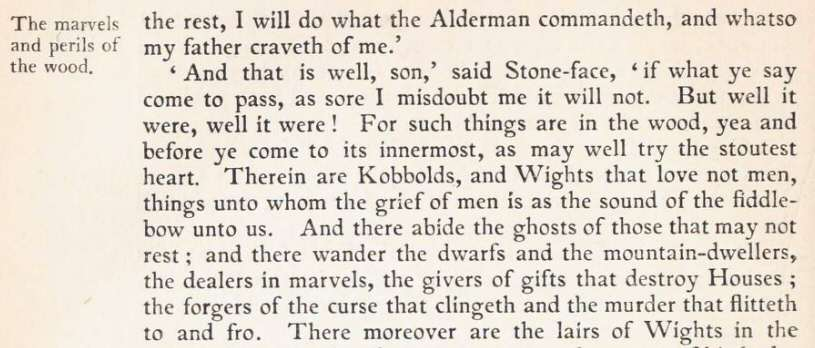
Extract from Morris's 1889 The Roots of the Mountains, describing "The marvels and perils of the wood", including kobbolds, wights, and dwarfs, parallelling many of Tolkien's races.

The work's good people, the Burgdalers, are pagan, but are "beautiful, generous, brave, and harmonious, in contrast to the society of the Dusky Men, who are ugly, foul, evil, and predatory." Massey likens all this to elements of Tolkien's novel. Further, women are allowed to be warriors, as with Tolkien's Éowyn. Morris describes the Dusky Men as "long-armed like apes", "as foul as swine", fighting with crooked swords, and forming "a stumbling jostling throng". Massey comments that their nature is dehumanised, so they can be slaughtered "with impunity", and that Tolkien modelled the Orcs on them. Morris made use of other races including kobolds, dwarfs, elves, ghosts, trolls, and wights, parallelling many of Tolkien's races.

Both Roots and its predecessor, The House of the Wolfings, incorporated poems and songs in the text; Roots differs in its happy fairytale ending, and in using invented rather than historical figures. Massey remarks the work's impression of depth, much as Shippey has described for The Lord of the Rings. Like Tolkien after him, Morris was closely involved in the book's printing, with "input into cover and jacket designs, illustrations, and maps".

== Medievalist aesthetics ==
=== Effect on Tolkien ===
Morris-style handicrafts: Tolkien's design for a Númenórean tile. (Note: Tolkien 1979, Figure 46) John Garth writes that illustrations of this kind reflect Morris's aesthetics.

Morris's books, such as those printed by his Kelmscott Press, are elaborately illustrated, in a style which strongly medieval, recalling illuminated manuscripts in which text and images, prose and poetry, are tightly interwoven. Tolkien's biographer John Garth wrote that this is reflected in Tolkien's artwork, especially his "frieze patterns and decorative picture-borders, his Númenórean tiles and Elven heraldic devices, and particularly his book-jacket designs". Hans Velten suggests that Morris's influence on Tolkien's "visual design of illustrations, ornamentation and manuscripts" was just as important as his influence on Tolkien's writing.

The Tolkien scholars Wayne G. Hammond and Christina Scull wrote that Tolkien evidently "agreed with the underlying philosophy of Morris and his followers, which looked back to a much earlier time: that the 'lesser' arts of handicraft embodied truth and beauty". They gave as examples the "carved pillars, floor of many hues, and 'woven cloth' of Théoden's Hall" Edoras.

=== Effect on Tolkien artists, films, and the public ===
Velten adds that Morris's graphic approach also had a powerful effect on fantasy after Tolkien, including on Tolkien artists such as Alan Lee. Velten suggests that Lee was comfortable with Tolkien's acceptance of Morris, and accordingly made his Middle-earth illustrations more like Morris's style. In Velten's view, Lee has in turn, through his work on Peter Jackson's 2001–2003 The Lord of the Rings film trilogy, influenced the "collective imagination" of how places and people should look in Middle-earth.

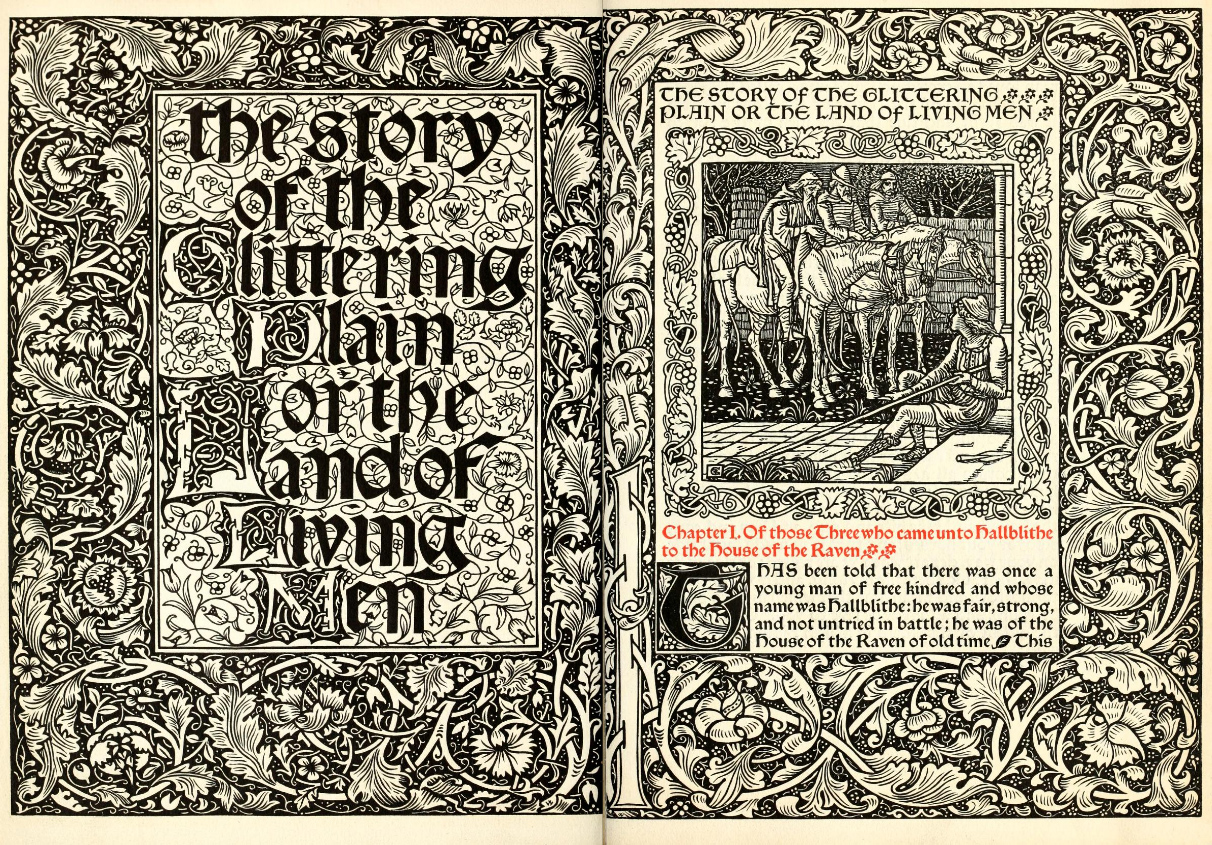
Morris's novels, such as The Story of the Glittering Plain, combine elaborate illustrations and drawn ornaments integrated with the text. This aesthetic influenced Tolkien, as did the text itself.

Morris's visual influence on Tolkien and beyond, via Alan Lee's illustrations and Peter Jackson's films

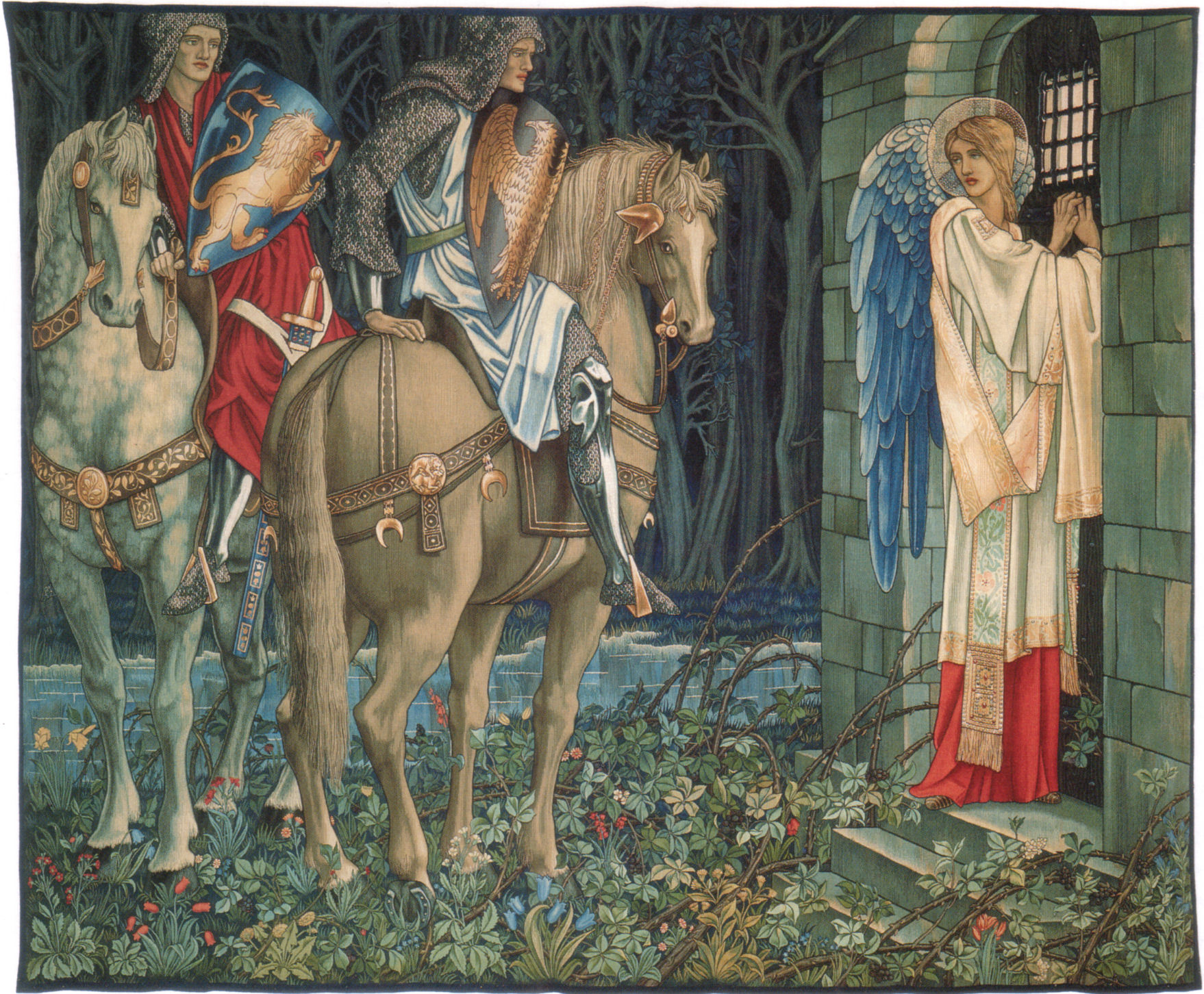
Velten suggests that the Tolkien artist Alan Lee followed Tolkien's liking of Morris by adopting something of his visual style. Morris's tapestry The Failure of Sir Gawaine illustrated.
