= Newcastle Forgotten Fantasy Library =

American novels published from 1973 to 1980

The Glittering Plain by William Morris, Newcastle Publishing Company, 1973

The Newcastle Forgotten Fantasy Library was a series of trade paperback fantasy books published in the United States by the Newcastle Publishing Company between 1973 and 1980.

== History ==
Presumably under the inspiration of the earlier example set by the Ballantine Adult Fantasy series, the series reissued a number of works of fantasy literature that had largely been forgotten, being out of print or otherwise not easily available in the United States, in durable, illustrated trade paperback form with new introductions. For a number of works the Library’s editions constituted the first U.S. or first paperback edition. Together with the earlier series from Ballantine Books, it contributed to the renaissance of interest in the fantasy genre of the 1970s.

The Library was produced under the editorship of Robert Reginald and Douglas Menville, editors of Forgotten Fantasy magazine, who were also responsible for several other similar series from other publishers. It included works by authors such as William Morris, H. Rider Haggard, Lord Dunsany, and Leslie Barringer, among others. Projected to include a total of twenty-six fantasy classics, the Library ultimately released only twenty-four. Possibly the remaining two are represented by two non-fantasy books Newcastle published without the series designation, the first two Dr. Nikola novels by Guy Boothby: Enter, Dr. Nikola (September 1975), and Dr. Nikola Returns (March 1976).

The covers for the first eight books were generic and described by their designer Douglas Menville as "rather crude". With the fourth book in the series, artists such as George Barr were engaged to produce more attractive covers at a discount, under an arrangement whereby the artist was able to retain the original paintings for private sale after the books were published. The ninth book onward featured more imaginative, wrap around art, and two of the first eight (She and Allan and Gerfalcon) were later reissued in this style.

== Books ==
1. The Glittering Plain, William Morris (September 1973)
2. The Saga of Eric Brighteyes, H. Rider Haggard (March 1974)
3. The Food of Death: Fifty-One Tales, Lord Dunsany (September 1974)
4. The Haunted Woman, David Lindsay (March 1975)
5. Aladore, Sir Henry Newbolt (September 1975)
6. She and Allan, H. Rider Haggard (September 1975)
7. Gerfalcon, Leslie Barringer (March 1976)
8. Golden Wings and Other Stories, William Morris (March 1976)
9. Joris of the Rock, Leslie Barringer (September 1976)
10. Heart of the World, H. Rider Haggard (September 1976)
11. The Wonderful Adventures of Phra the Phoenician, Edwin Lester Arnold (April 1977)
12. Child Christopher and Goldilind the Fair, William Morris (April 1977)
13. Shy Leopardess, Leslie Barringer (October 1977)
14. Ayesha: the Return of She, H. Rider Haggard (October 1977)
15. The Fates of the Princes of Dyfed, Kenneth Morris (April 1978)
16. The House of the Wolfings, William Morris (April 1978)
17. Under the Sunset, Bram Stoker (October 1978)
18. Allan Quatermain, H. Rider Haggard (October 1978)
19. The Roots of the Mountains, William Morris (April 1979)
20. Nada the Lily, H. Rider Haggard (April 1979)
21. Jaufry the Knight and the Fair Brunissende, translated by Alfred Elwes (October 1979)
22. The Spirit of Bambatse, H. Rider Haggard (October 1979)
23. When the Birds Fly South, Stanton A. Coblentz (April 1980)
24. Allan's Wife, H. Rider Haggard (October 1980)
