= Hauberk =

Thigh-length sleeved mail shirt

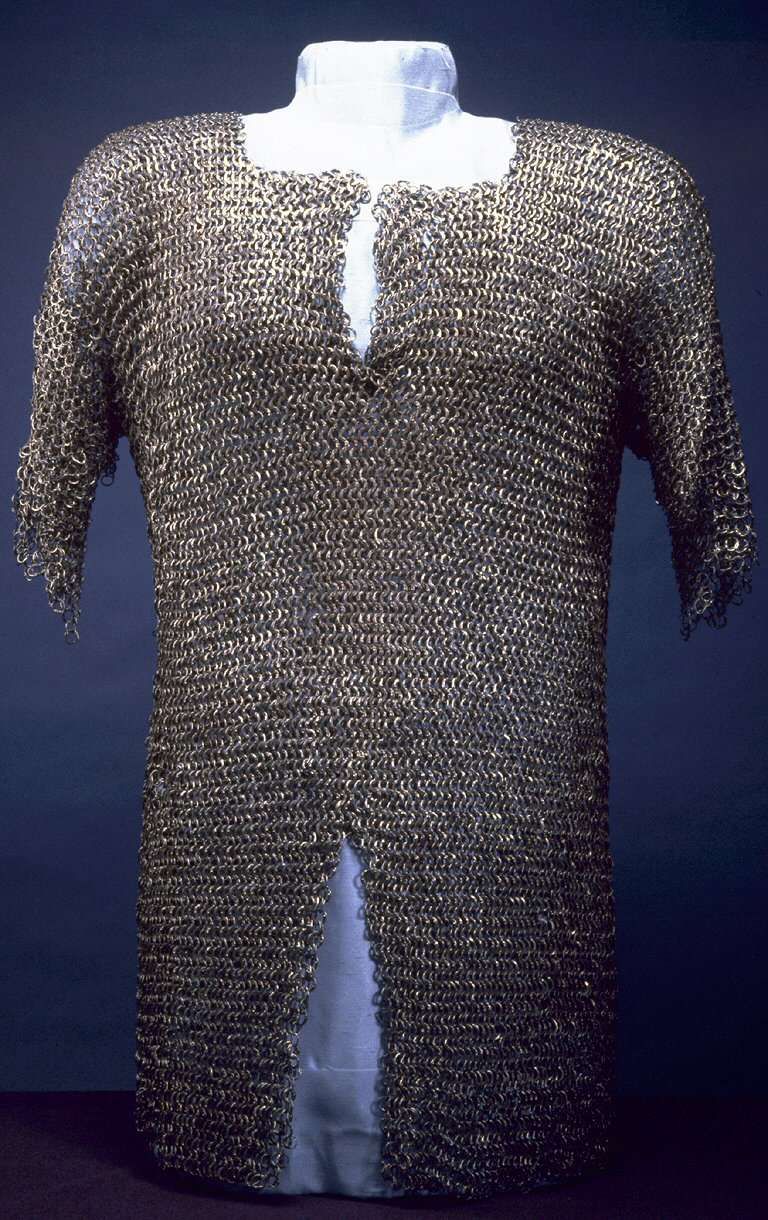
Italian hauberk from the late 15th century

A hauberk or byrnie is a mail shirt. The term is usually used to describe a shirt reaching at least to mid-thigh and including sleeves. A haubergeon ("little hauberk") refers to a smaller mail shirt, that was sometimes sleeveless, but the terms are occasionally used interchangeably. Mail armor, likely invented by the Celts, became widely adopted for its flexibility and spread throughout Europe and Asia, becoming a staple in Roman legions and medieval warfare. By the 11th century, the hauberk evolved into a knee-length, sleeved mail shirt, as depicted in the Bayeux Tapestry and it remained in use in Europe until the Renaissance despite the rise of plate armor.

== Etymology ==
The word hauberk (c. 1300) comes from the Old French word hauberc, meaning "coat of mail", which originally derived from the earlier Frankish or similar Germanic word halsberg, literally translating to "neck protector". This word breaks down into two parts: hals, meaning "neck", which has counterparts in various languages like Old English, Old Norse, and Old High German, and bergan, meaning "to cover or protect". The root of bergan comes from the Proto-Indo-European (PIE) root bhergh- meaning "to hide or protect". Meanwhile, the word hals traces its origin to the PIE root kwel-, meaning "to revolve or move around".

The term byrnie comes from the Old English word byrne, which is connected to the Old Norse brynja and the Gothic brunjō, all referring to a coat of mail. Similarly, in Old High German, the word brunnia carries the same meaning. It is also related to the Old Irish word bruinne, meaning "breast".

== History ==
=== Biblical references ===
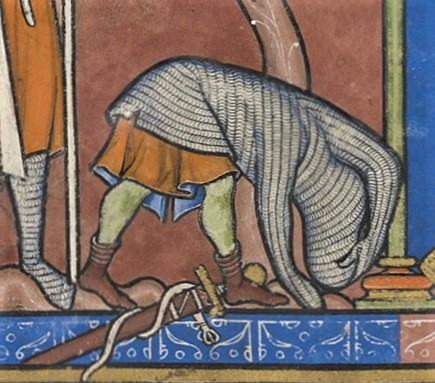
David removing a hauberk, from the 13th-century Morgan Bible

In the Hebrew Bible the shiryon, translated "habergeon" or a "coat of mail," is mentioned as part of the armor of Nehemiah's workers, and one of the pieces of armor supplied by King Uzziah to his soldiers. Goliath was also armed with a "coat of mail", weighing five thousand shekels (55 kg (121 lb)), as he confronted David.

=== Invention and spread of mail armor ===
Mail armor, consisting of interwoven metal rings, is credited by some, including Varro, as having been invented by the Celts. Archaeological evidence supports this, with notable finds like the Ciumești Celtic grave, containing a mail hauberk made of butted rings. This type of body armor was widely adopted due to its flexibility and ease of movement compared to other armor types. The Celts are said to have used mail armor, though it was expensive and likely limited to the wealthier members of society, such as chieftains and officers. The armor spread throughout Europe and Asia, becoming a popular form of protection, particularly among the Roman legions.

=== Development of the hauberk ===
The will of Eberhard of Friuli, an important figure of the Carolingian Empire, includes the term "helmum cum hasbergha", likely referring to a helmet with a neck protector. While "hasbergha" later came to mean a shirt of mail, in the 9th century it likely referred to a neck guard, as suggested by its etymology and historical finds like the Spangenhelm and Anglo-Saxon helmets with mail curtains for neck protection. Initially made from leather to protect the neck and throat, it gradually evolved into more comprehensive armor, incorporating mail and extending to cover the head, neck, and shoulders.

By the 10th century, the hauberk was common among well-armored warriors, often paired with a helmet. In the 11th and 12th centuries, the hauberk merged with the mail shirt, forming a single protective garment that reached the knees, offering better defense against weapons. Such armor was quite expensive due to the cost of materials, such as iron wire, and the time and skill required for its manufacture. As a result, common foot soldiers were rarely equipped with it. By the mid-12th century, hauberks had expanded to include longer sleeves and more protection for the legs.

=== Depictions in the Bayeux Tapestry ===
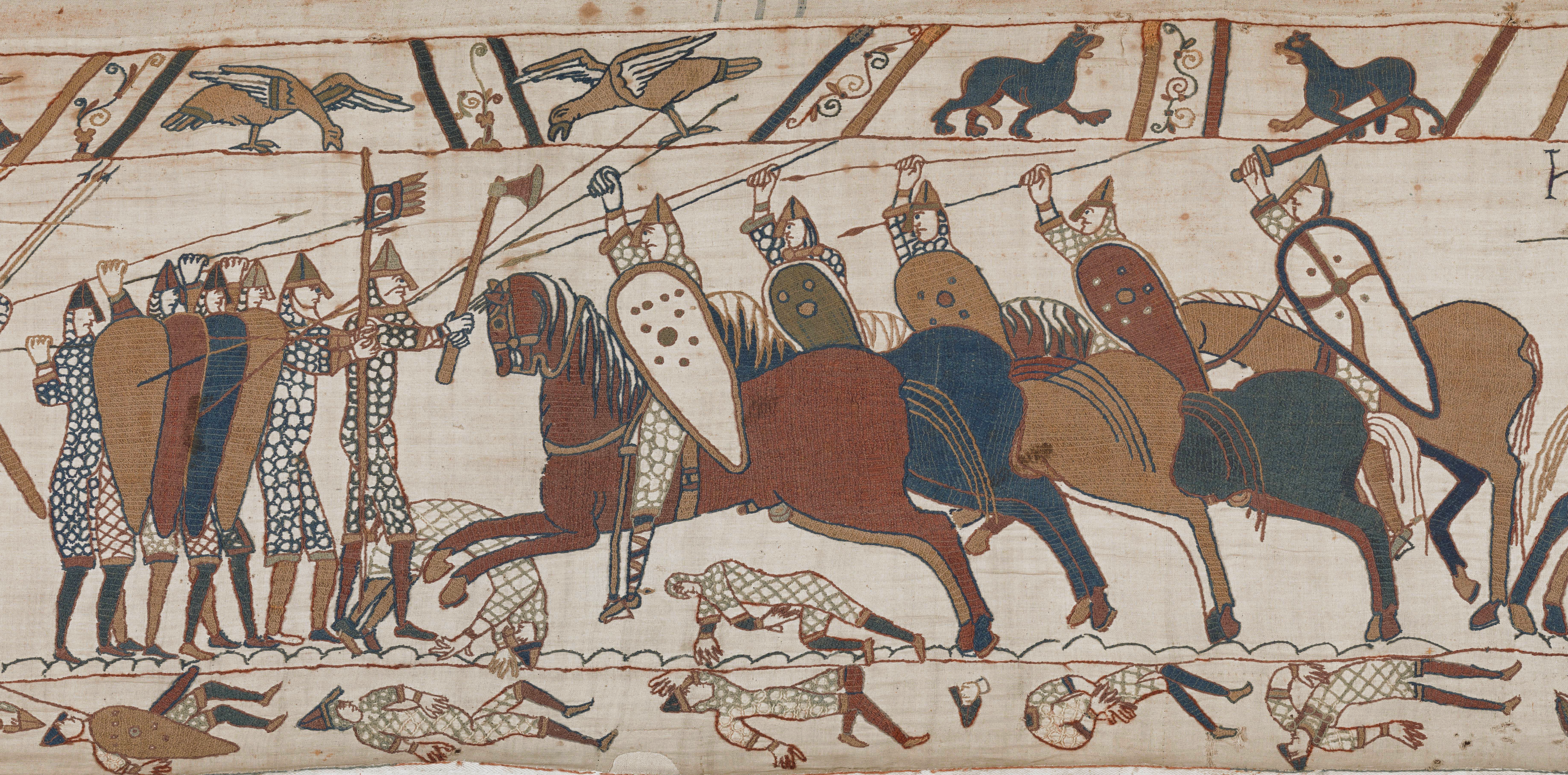
Scene from Bayeux Tapestry showing infantry fighting horsemen, with both sides wearing hauberks.

The Bayeux Tapestry depicts Norman soldiers, both cavalry and infantry, wearing a knee-length version of the hauberk, with three-quarter length sleeves and a split from hem to crotch to allow for easier movement, especially while riding, which evolved from the Carolingian byrnie. Hauberks were likely worn over heavy padded undergarments called a gambeson, which helped prevent bruising from weapon blows. While some figures are shown with additional protection for their forearms and colored bands around the sleeves, most soldiers lack arm and leg armor, though leaders like William the Conqueror wore mail leggings called chausses. Several Norman horsemen, including William, are depicted with colored rectangles on the breast of their hauberks.

In the 11th century, men-at-arms likely did not wear full mail trousers, but the hauberk appears to have incorporated cloth or leather inserts that offered comparable protection. Additionally, it included a mail hood that covered the head, neck, and throat, leaving an opening for the face similar to a modern balaclava. Beneath this hood, padding made from cloth or leather was used for extra comfort and protection, while a pointed iron helmet with a nose-guarding bar, called a nasal, was worn over it. A Norman knight's defensive gear included a large, kite-shaped shield that stood almost two-thirds as tall as its bearer. Its considerable size reflected the partial protection provided by the hauberk.

=== Surviving examples and later use ===
A hauberk stored in the Prague Cathedral and dating from the 12th century is one of the earliest surviving examples from Central Europe, and was supposedly owned by Saint Wenceslaus. In Europe, use of mail hauberks continued up through the 14th century, when plate armor began to supplant it. Some knights continued to wear chain hauberks, however, underneath plate armor. It remained in usage until the Renaissance. In parts of Central Asia, it continued to be used for a longer time.

== Construction ==
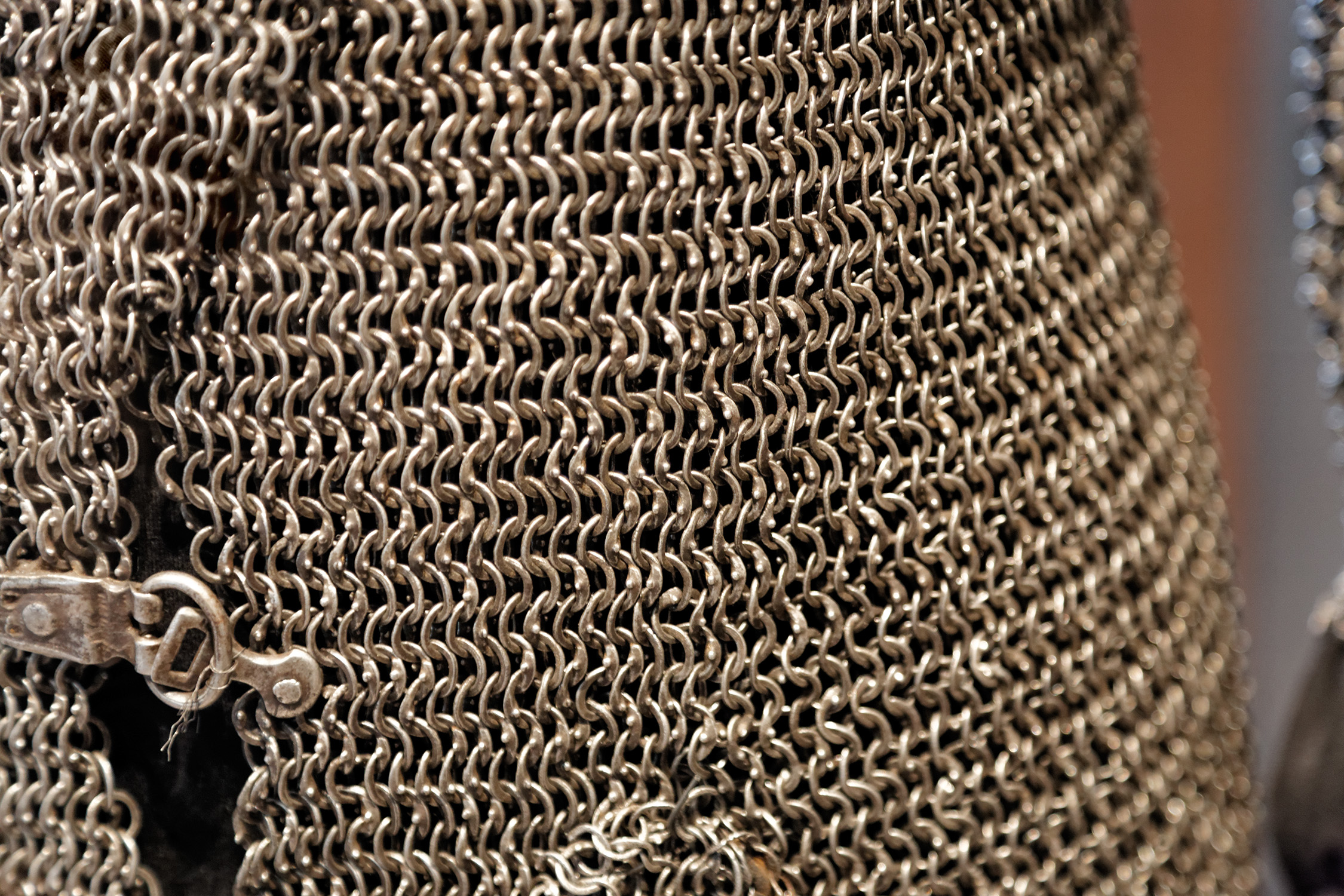
Detail of hauberk made in Nuremberg, Germany, c. 1350

Hauberks were typically constructed from interlocking metal loops forming a mail shirt. The rings were riveted together piece by piece, forming a complete tissue of iron, and were called grains d'orge due to their resemblance to barley grains. The sleeves sometimes only went to the elbow, but often were full arm length, with some covering the hands with a supple glove leather face on the palm of the hand, or even full mail gloves. It was usually thigh or knee length, with a split in the front and back to the groin so the wearer could ride a horse. It sometimes incorporated a hood, or coif. Per historian Kelly DeVries "the hauberk was probably worn over, but not attached to, a heavy, quilted undergarment, the haubergeon."

Early versions of the hauberk existed in various forms, such as the ringed hauberk where metal rings were sewn onto leather or padded material. Other types included the "rustred" hauberk with overlapping rings, the "macled" coat made of metal plates, and the trellised coat reinforced with nail-heads. A larger, more complex version, the jazerant or "korazin", featured overlapping metal plates in an imbricated fashion. Eventually, mail hauberks, made entirely of interlocking iron rings, became common. These hauberks were crafted in either single or double mail, where each ring connected to four others.

While lighter than plate armor, a hauberk could be quite heavy. William of Poitiers, the author of the Gesta Guillemi, praises William the Conqueror's strength by describing that "he carried on his own shoulders both his own hauberk and that of one of his own followers, William FitzOsbern, renowned for his bodily strength and courage, whom he had relieved of this iron burden."

== In literature ==
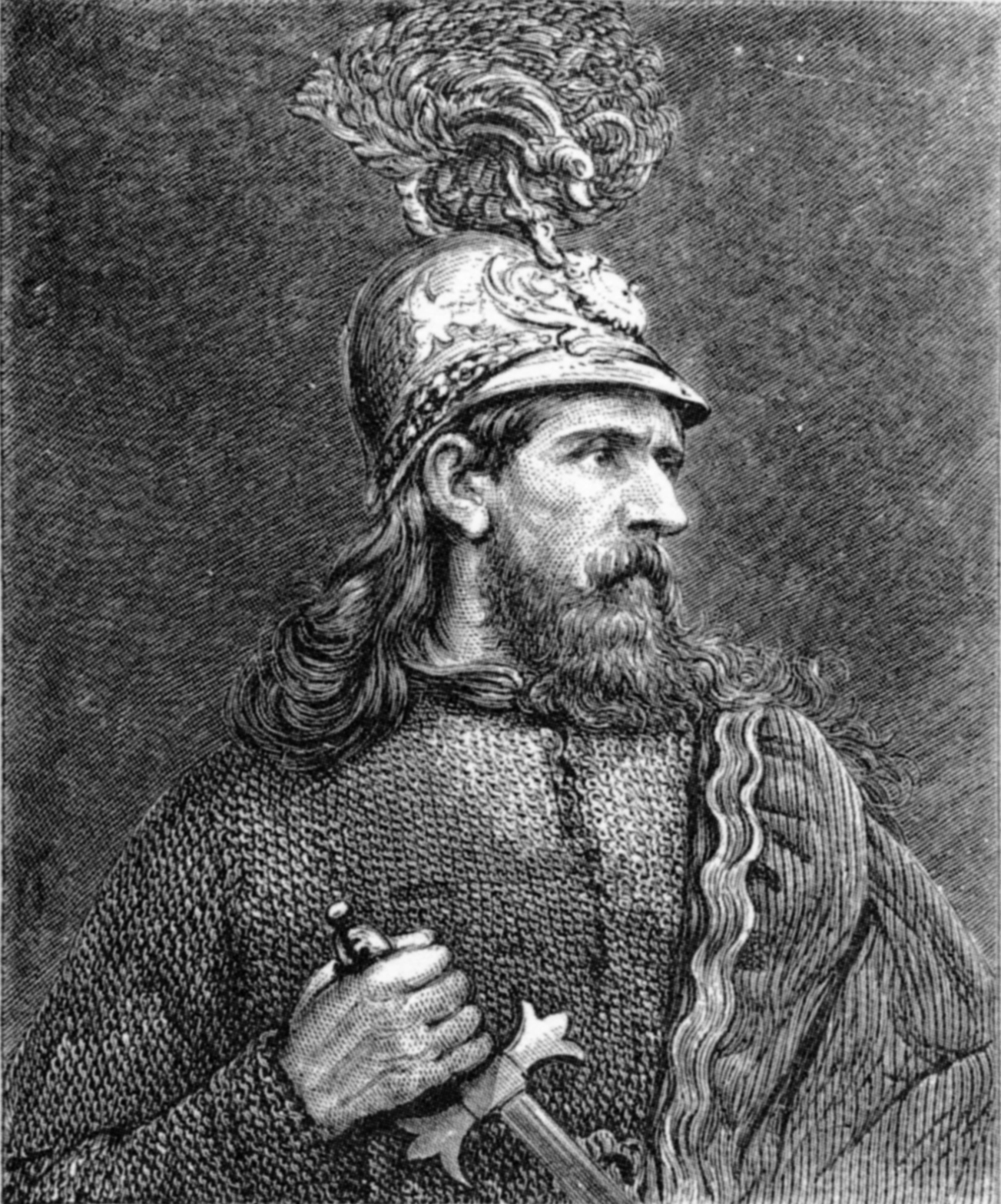
King Arthur wearing a hauberk; frontispiece from Idylls of the King by Alfred, Lord Tennyson.

In the Old English epic poem Beowulf, the poet draws attention to the protective armour worn by both Wiglaf and Beowulf at key moments. When Wiglaf enters the dragon's lair, the description centres on his byrnie. Similarly, when Beowulf sinks into Grendel's lair, the poet again notes his coat of mail, presenting armour as a central feature of their heroic encounters.

This French epic poem the Song of Roland describes the Battle of Roncevaux Pass and includes detailed descriptions of knights' armaments. The hauberk is frequently mentioned as part of the warriors' gear: "For with my own eyes I saw four hundred thousand armed men, clad in their hauberks and many of them with closed helmets, girded with swords whose pommels were of chased gold, who accompanied him as far as the sea."

Chaucer refers to both hauberks and haubergeons in The Canterbury Tales, in The Knight's Tale he describes: "Gold-hewen helmes, hauberkes, cote-armures".

In this classic Arthurian text, Le Morte d'Arthur by Sir Thomas Malory, knights wear hauberks when they go into battle: "Balyn hyt hym thorugh the sheld / and the hauberk perysshed".

In William Morris' The House of the Wolfings, Thiodolf, a formidable warrior with divine lineage, rises to defend his people against a Roman invasion. His valkyrie lover presents him with a dwarf-forged, enchanted hauberk for protection. However, Thiodolf soon learns that the armor weakens his leadership and causes him to falter in battle. Realizing its detrimental effect, he abandons the hauberk, choosing to sacrifice his life to save his people. In the end, his people rally to a crushing victory over the Roman forces, ensuring the preservation of their culture and way of life. In Morris' The Roots of the Mountains, a female warrior is linked to receiving a gift of armor. Here, it is Bow-may who requests a hauberk and helm crafted by Goldmane's father. Iron-face presents her with "a hauberk of ring-mail of his own fashioning", which fills her with immense joy as she can hardly stop marveling at the craftsmanship of the ring-mail.

Tolkien, inspired by medieval literature and history, frequently references hauberks in his Lord of the Rings trilogy. Most notably, Frodo Baggins is gifted a shirt made of mithril by Bilbo. The Ringwraiths are also depicted as wearing hauberks.

== Gallery ==
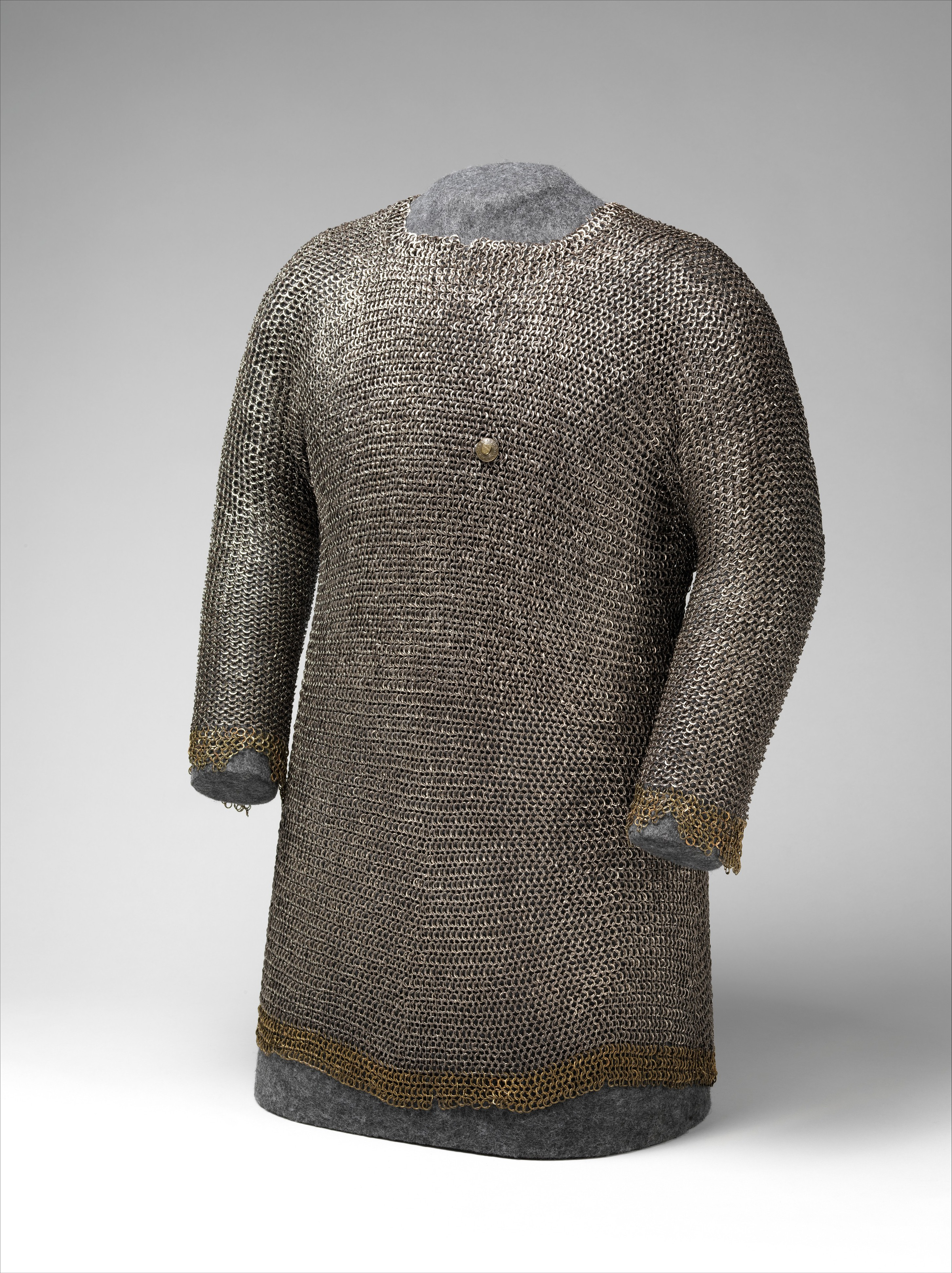
German hauberk

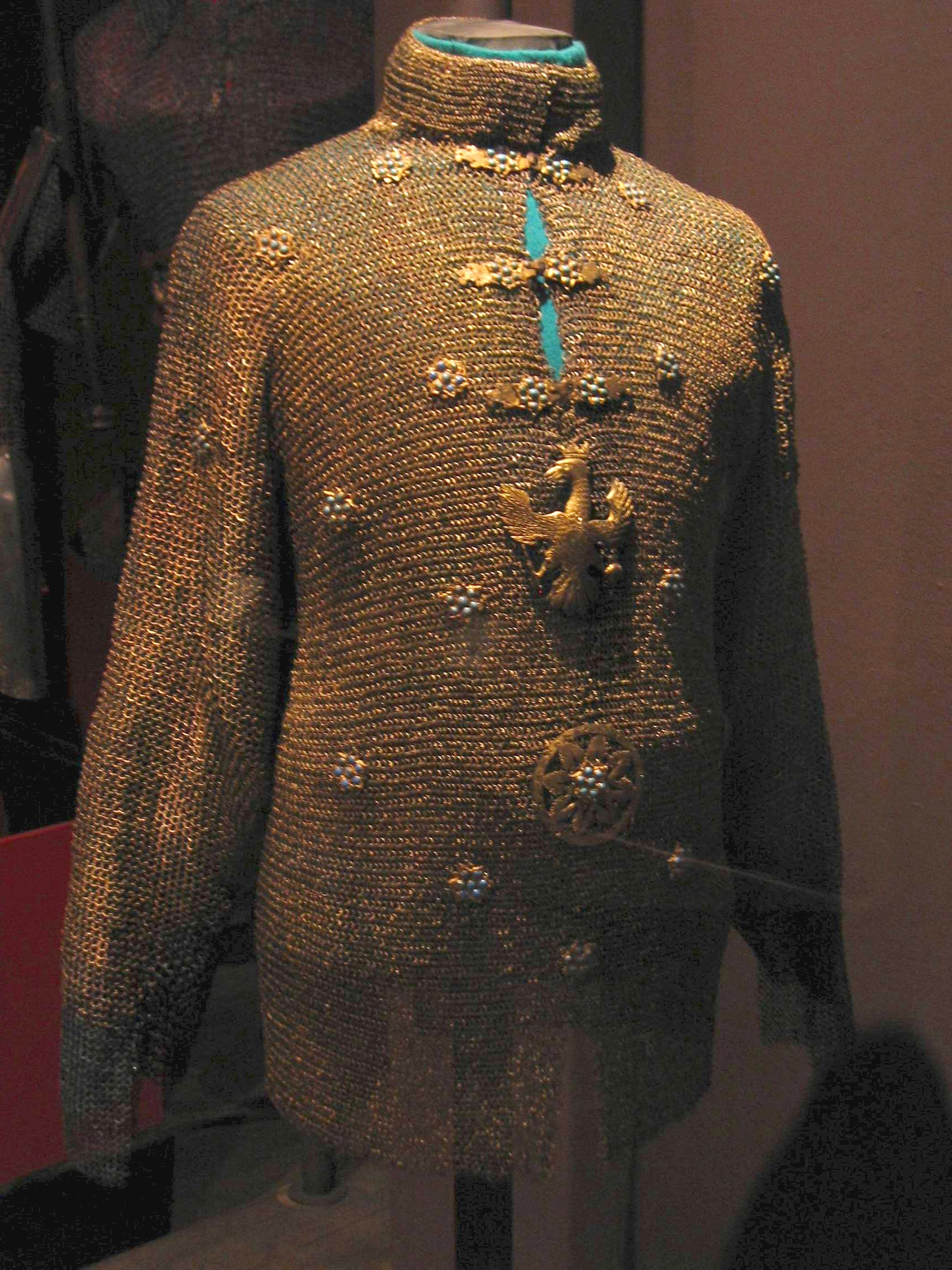
Polish hauberk

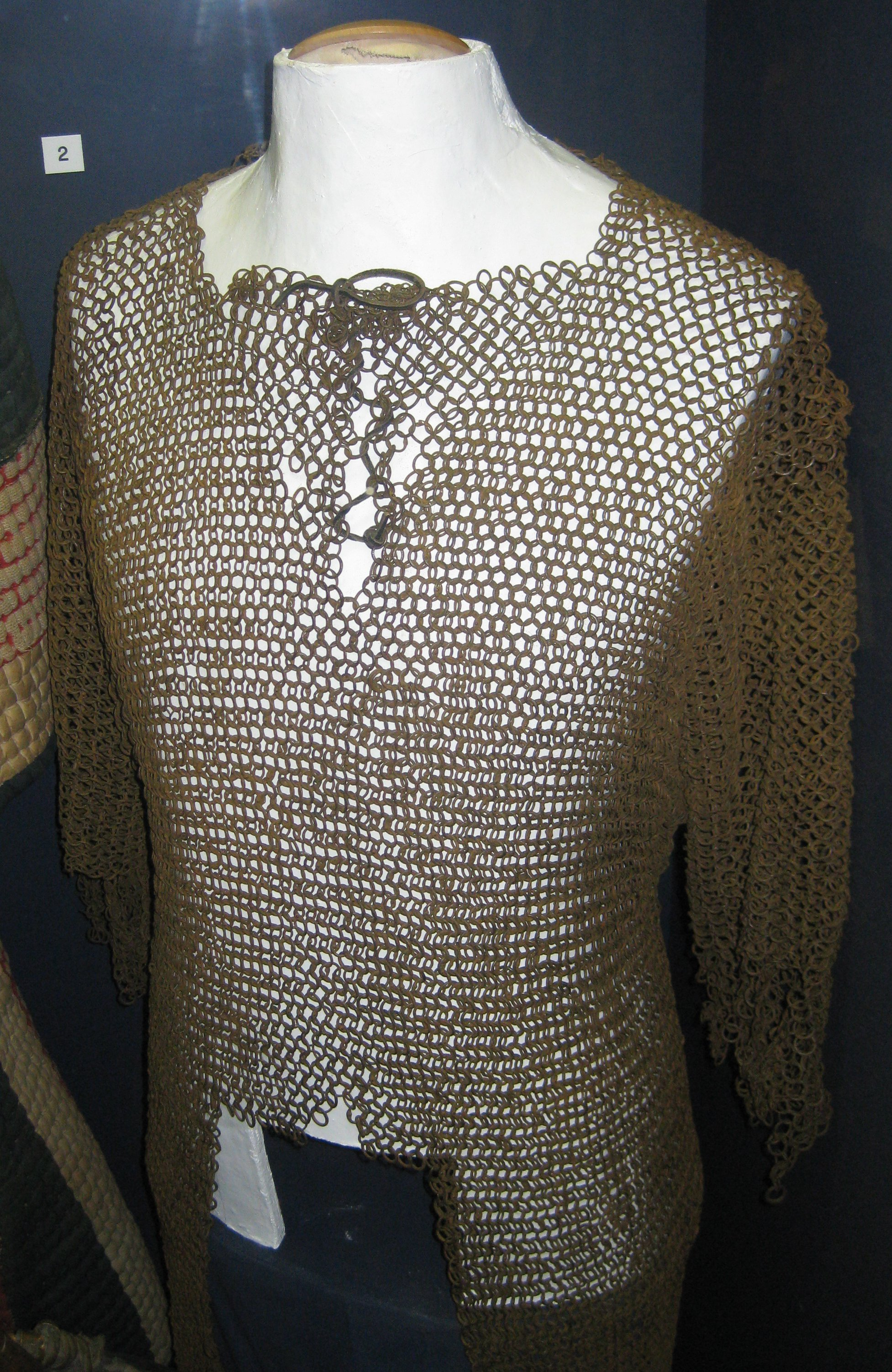
Sudanese hauberk

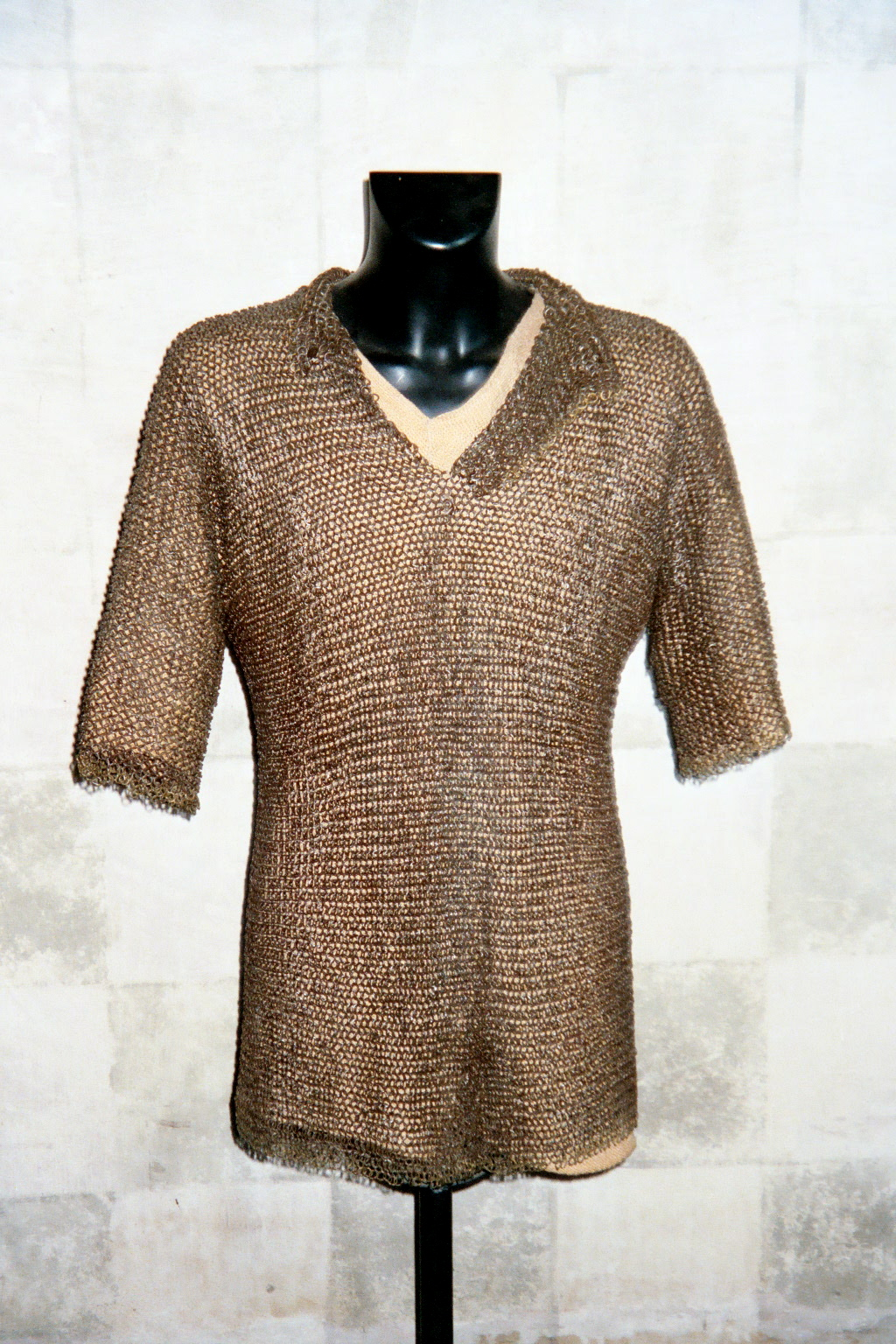
European hauberk

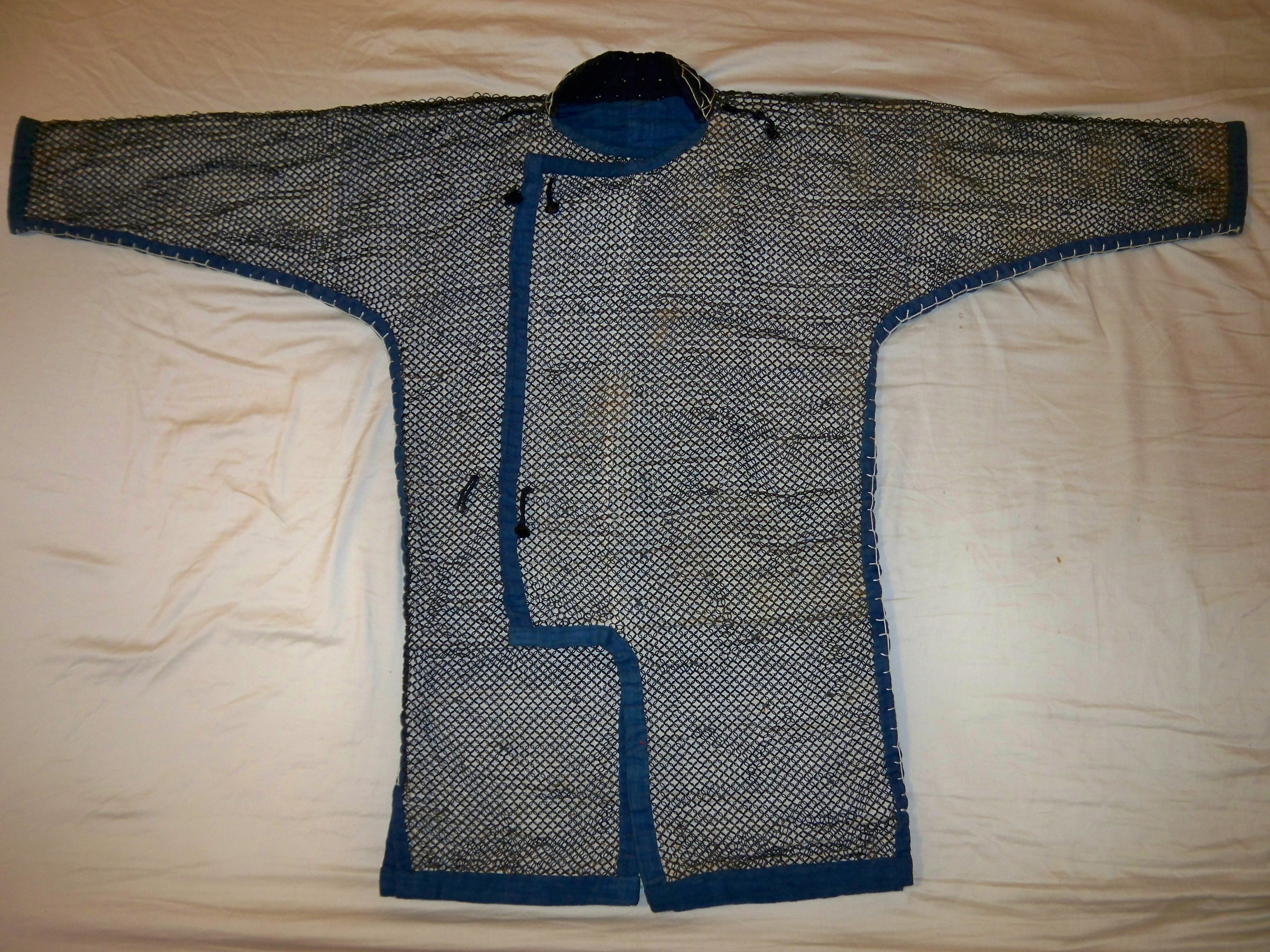
Japanese hauberk

== See also ==
- Mail and plate armour – a type of mail with embedded plates
