= Golden Wings and Other Stories =

1976 collection of fantasy short stories by William Morris

- First edition of Golden Wings and Other Stories by William Morris, Newcastle Publishing Company, 1976
- Author: William Morris
- Language: English
- Series: Newcastle Forgotten Fantasy Library
- Genre: fantasy
- Publisher: Newcastle Publishing Company
- Publication date: 1976
- Publication place: United States
- Media type: Print (paperback)
- Pages: xvi, 169
- ISBN: 0-87877-107-7

Golden Wings and Other Stories is a collection of fantasy short stories by British writer William Morris, first published in trade paperback by the Newcastle Publishing Company in March 1976 as the eighth volume of the celebrated Newcastle Forgotten Fantasy Library. The first hardcover edition was published by Borgo Press in 1980. It collects all of Morris's short stories originally published in The Oxford and Cambridge Magazine, a student magazine that ran for the 12 months of 1856. They were later republished in various collections of Morris's work. More recently the stories have been combined with Morris's other contributions to the magazine, including reviews, essays and poems, to form the expanded collection The Hollow Land and Other Contributions to the Oxford and Cambridge Magazine, published by Forgotten Books in June, 2010

The book contains short works of fiction by the author, together with an introduction by Alfred Noyes and an afterword by Richard B. Mathews.

== Contents ==
- "Introduction" (Alfred Noyes)
- "The Story of the Unknown Church"
- "Lindenborg Pool"
- "A Dream"
- "Gertha's Lovers"
- "Svend and His Brethren"
- "The Hollow Land"
- "Golden Wings"
- "Frank's Sealed Letter"
- "Afterword" (Richard B. Mathews)
