= The Roots of the Mountains =

1889 novel by William Morris

- Title page of first edition
- Author: William Morris
- Language: English
- Genre: Fantasy romance
- Publisher: Reeves and Turner
- Publication date: 1889
- Publication place: United Kingdom
- Media type: Print (Hardback)
- Pages: 424 pp
- Preceded by: The House of the Wolfings

The Roots of the Mountains: Wherein is Told Somewhat of the Lives of the Men of Burgdale, Their Friends, Their Neighbours, Their Foemen, and Their Fellows in Arms is a fantasy romance novel by William Morris, perhaps the first modern fantasy writer to unite an imaginary world with an element of the supernatural, and thus the precursor of much of present-day fantasy literature. It was first published in hardcover by Reeves and Turner in 1889. Its place in the history of fantasy literature was recognized by its republication by the Newcastle Publishing Company as the nineteenth volume of the Newcastle Forgotten Fantasy Library in April, 1979.

According to Graham Seaman, "The Roots of the Mountains seems to be the story that inspired the subplot of the Dunedain, wanderers of a fading heroic past defending the frontiers of the Shire against the Orcs, and the loves of Aragorn, Eowyn, Faramir, and Arwen in Tolkien's Lord of the Rings."

This work and its predecessor, The House of the Wolfings, are to some degree historical novels, with little or no magic. Morris went on to develop the new genre established in these works in such later fantasies as The Wood Beyond the World, Child Christopher and Goldilind the Fair, The Well at the World's End, The Water of the Wondrous Isles and The Sundering Flood.

== Plot summary ==
The story is set in the fictional Burgdale, a small Germanic settlement in a valley at the foot of a mountain range, and the neighbouring woodlands, pastures and dales. The area is inhabited by the interdependent Dalemen, who are weavers, smiths, and traders, the Woodlanders, who are hunters and carpenters, and the Shepherds. Their society is challenged by disruptions from the outside world in the form of the Sons of the Wolf, the descendants of the Wolfings from the previous novel, and the invading Dusky Men (the Huns). The Sons of the Wolf, driven from their original country by the Dusky Men, continue to resist the invaders as a frontier force guarding their new home. The somewhat troubled integration of the Sons of the Wolf into the society they are protecting is told in the story of five lovers representing both peoples, four of whom eventually marry.

Morris projected a sequel to The Roots of the Mountains to be called The Story of Desiderius, although it was never completed.

== Editions ==
The Roots of the Mountains has seen republication several times since Morris's death. In 1979, Newcastle Publishing Company included it in the company's Forgotten Fantasy Library series with an illustrated cover by Riley K. Smith and an advertised introduction by Richard Mathews (although the edition itself notes that "it did not reach us in time to make the printing deadline".

2024 saw a new edition from publishing house Hyldyr featuring an introduction from J. R. R. Tolkien's great-grand daughter Ruth Tolkien, the introduction of an illustrated map of Burgdale by Sylvia and Tristan Eden, and commentary from folklorist Joseph S. Hopkins on Morris's inspiration from the ancient Germanic record. This edition splits the book into two volumes and features excerpts from some of the influences Morris draws from in The Roots of the Mountains, such as Getica by Jordanes.

== Influence ==
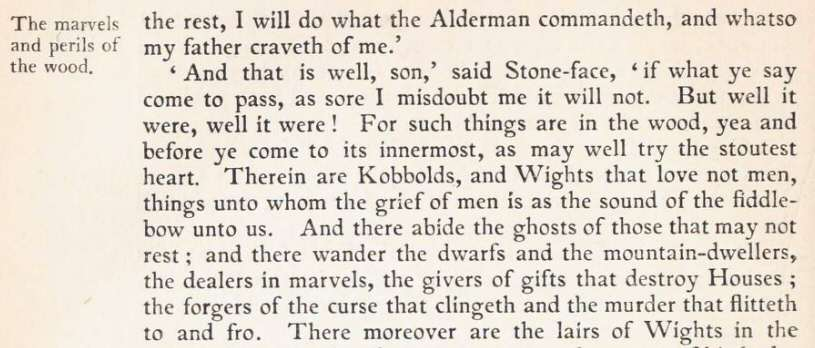
Extract from The Roots of the Mountains (page 22), describing "The marvels and perils of the wood", including kobbolds, wights, and dwarfs, parallelling many of Tolkien's races.

J. R. R. Tolkien identified the novel as an influence on his epic fantasy The Lord of the Rings in a 1960 letter, stating that "The Dead Marshes and the approaches to the Morannon owe something to northern France after the Battle of the Somme. They owe more to William Morris and his Huns and Romans, as in The House of the Wolfings or The Roots of the Mountains." Scholars have remarked many other parallels, such as races of beings including elves, dwarfs, trolls, and wights used by both Morris and Tolkien, as well as archaic diction, plot elements, and landscape descriptions. Tolkien may have modelled his orcs that can be slaughtered without compunction on Morris's "Dusky Men".

== Sources ==
- Carpenter, Humphrey, ed. (2023) [1981]. The Letters of J. R. R. Tolkien: Revised and Expanded Edition. New York: HarperCollins. ISBN 978-0-35-865298-4.
