= Benita (novel) =

1906 novel by Henry Rider Haggard

Benita: An African Romance
- Cover of 1st edition
- Author: H. Rider Haggard
- Illustrator: Gordon Browne
- Language: English
- Publisher: Cassell & Company
- Publication date: 1906
- Publication place: United Kingdom
- Media type: Print (hardcover)
- Pages: vi, 334 pages

Benita: An African Romance (alternatively titled The Spirit of Bambatse) is a novel by H. Rider Haggard.

== Publication history ==
The novel was first published in serial form in Cassell's Magazine in the December 1905 through May 1906 issues; the first hardcover edition followed from Cassell & Company, London, 7 September 1906. Cassell reissued the title in 1920 and 1926. Subsequent British editions were published by Chariot Books in 1952 and Macdonald & Co. in 1965. An ebook edition was issued by Project Gutenberg in March 2006.

The first U.S. edition was published by Longmans, Green and Co. in 1906 under the alternate title The Spirit of Bambatse, A Romance, which was Haggard's preferred title and was used for most later American editions. The significance of the collection was recognized by its republication (also as The Spirit of Bambatse) by the Newcastle Publishing Company as the twenty-second volume of the Newcastle Forgotten Fantasy Library series in October, 1979. The Newcastle edition was reissued by Wildside Press in February 2001.

The novel has also been gathered together with Haggard's Ayesha: The Return of She (1905) into the omnibus collection Ayesha: The Return of She / Benita: An African Romance (New Orchard, 1986).

== Plot ==
In an adventure mingling romance and the supernatural, the clairvoyant heroine Benita assists in a hunt for a lost Portuguese treasure buried in the Transvaal.

The story begins with Benita Clifford on a ship bound for southern Africa. There she intends to be reunited with her elderly father, whom she has not seen for years, and live with him on his remote African farm. While still on the ship she meets a young Englishman called Robert Seymour, who one day proposes to her. Before Benita can answer, however, the pair are interrupted and soon discover the ship is sinking. Benita is knocked unconscious, and Robert carries her to a lifeboat. He gives up his place on the boat to a young woman and her child, resolving to try to swim to shore himself. Robert lands on the coast barely alive, and is indeed thought to be dead.

Meanwhile the lifeboat is picked up by another ship, where Benita regains consciousness; learning of Robert's heroism she comes to love him and mourn his apparent demise.

Benita meets her father; the pair start travelling across the African veldt to his farm, which the father shares with his partner, a German Jew called Jacob Meyer. Benita and her father get lost on the way to the ranch and are rescued by Meyer; from the instant he sees Benita, Meyer is convinced that he has some sort of telepathic communication with her and that she possesses clairvoyant powers.

Benita stays on the farm with her father and Meyer until three men arrive. These men are from the Makalanga tribe who live in a town called Bambaste, located on a large hill. There is a legend that several centuries before, the Portuguese had hidden vast treasure at the top of this mountain. The Makalanga are now in danger of attack from the Matabele tribe, and tell Mr. Clifford and Meyer that if they give the Makalanga a hundred rifles to fight the Matabele, they will be allowed all the gold they can find at Bambaste. They agree to this proposition; Benita follows Clifford and Meyer to Bambaste.

The Molimo, chief of the Makalanga, guides Clifford, Meyer and Benita to a cave atop the hill of Bambaste. The treasure is supposed to be in this cave, but the adventurers only find skeletons and a huge carved figure of Christ on the Cross. They begin to search for the treasure in this cave, which Meyer becomes obsessed with to the extent that Clifford and Benita fear he is going insane. He disrespects the remains of the dead, leading the Molimo to prophecy their ghosts will have their revenge on him. Meyer grows so unpleasant that Benita decides she and her father are going to escape Bambaste on horseback. They flee the town on horseback, but a few miles further on are attacked by the Matabele and are forced to flee back to Bambaste, near which they are again rescued by Meyer.

The next morning Meyer blocks off all possible escape routes from the top of the hill, and begins to behave threateningly towards Benita's father. Since he believes Benita to be clairvoyant, Meyer mesmerises her, ordering her spirit to find out where the treasure is hidden. Meyer is briefly terrified when the hypnotised Benita starts speaking Portuguese, a language she cannot speak. She declares she is possessed by the spirit of one of the Portuguese who hid the treasure and died here centuries ago. However, she fails to reveal the location of the treasure. Later, Meyer declares his love for Benita. Horrified she tries to keep him away, but he again mesmerises her, drawing him closer until he manages to kiss her. At this moment Benita breaks free from the spell and runs to her father, who Meyer threatens to murder.

Benita and her father, who has now fallen ill, barricade themselves in the cave to preserve themselves from Meyer. One night as they sleep within this cave Benita experiences another clairvoyant dream in which she is given the location of the treasure within the cave. By moving the giant statue of Christ, Benita finds a secret passage which not only leads to the treasure chamber, but which leads to the base of the hill of Bambaste. Benita follows this passage and finds none other than Robert Seymour, who she thought was dead, taken prisoner by the Matabele. Using her wit Benita saves Robert from the Matabele. She then uses the passage to return to the cave. Robert and two Zulus break down the barrier Benita built and restrain Meyer from attacking them. Meyer is then shown the treasure chamber. He is ecstatic, but suddenly becomes terrified at something the others cannot see. He dies of horror, and Benita notices that on the cave floor next to his body are strange footprints. Benita, her father, and Robert Seymour leave Bambaste laden with treasure, and the Molimo prophecies they will have a long and happy life together.

== Reception ==
E. F. Bleiler described Benita as "a good adventure story, but without the power or depth of Haggard's other work."

== Themes ==
Benita bears several similarities to other works by Haggard. Like The Ivory Child (1916) it features a young woman with clairvoyant powers, and like King Solomon's Mines (1885) it deals with the idea of ancient Phoenicians visiting Africa and hiding their treasure in a chamber there. Benita also features prophecies, visions and other supernatural content, and like many of Haggard's novels it is set in southern Africa, drawing from his own experience living there from 1875 to 1882.
