= When the Birds Fly South =

1945 novel by Stanton A. Coblentz

- Dust cover of the first edition
- Author: Stanton A. Coblentz
- Language: English
- Genre: Fantasy
- Publisher: The Wings Press
- Publication date: 1945
- Publication place: United States
- Media type: Print (hardback)
- Pages: 223

When the Birds Fly South is a lost race fantasy novel by American writer Stanton A. Coblentz, defined as a "significant tale ... involving avian theriomorphy." It was first published in hardcover by The Wings Press, Mill Valley, California in 1945 and reprinted in 1951. Its importance in the history of fantasy literature was recognized by its republication by the Newcastle Publishing Company as the twenty-third volume of the Newcastle Forgotten Fantasy Library in April, 1980. The Newcastle edition was the first paperback edition, and had a new introduction by the author. Later editions were issued by Arno Press (1978) and Borgo Press (1980).

== Plot summary ==
Dan Prescott, an American adventurer, discovers the hidden valley of Sobul in a mountainous region of Afghanistan, inhabited by a strange race of winged people known as the "Ibandru". He falls in love with one of them, Yasma, and they marry in a scene of general celebration. When fall comes, however, the Ibandru abandon their valley to fly south with the birds for the winter. Unable to bear the loss of Yasma, Prescott pleads with her to remain with him rather than participate in the traditional migration, with tragic consequences for his marriage.

== Reception ==
According to Gertrude Atherton, "Not only has this remarkable book a high fiction value, but the style, rich and chromatic, is a poet's prose (not 'poetical prose'), and the descriptions, wild, varied, and magnificent, are unsurpassed by any I have ever read."
