= Aladore =

1914 novel by Sir Henry Newbolt

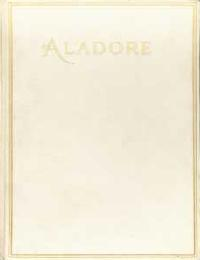
- Cover of first edition
- Author: Sir Henry Newbolt
- Language: English
- Genre: Fantasy novel
- Publisher: William Blackwood and Sons
- Publication date: 1914
- Publication place: United Kingdom
- Media type: Print (Hardback)
- Pages: 362 pp.

Aladore is a classic allegorical fantasy novel written by English poet Henry Newbolt. It was first published in hardcover by William Blackwood and Sons, Edinburgh, in 1914. An American edition from E. P. Dutton & Company, followed in 1915. The first paperback edition was issued by the Newcastle Publishing Company as the fifth volume of the Newcastle Forgotten Fantasy Library in September, 1975; this edition was reissued by Borgo Press in 1980. The book has been translated into German.

== Plot summary ==
The story takes the form of a quest exploring in allegorical fashion the qualities of youth, duty, self and heritage. Ywain, a knight bored with his administrative duties, abandons his estate to his younger brother and goes on a pilgrimage to seek his heart's desire. Following a will-o'-the-wisp resembling a child, he is led to a hermit dwelling in the wilderness, under whose instruction he lives for a time. Afterwards his quest takes him to the city of Paladore (also the subject of a separate poem by Newbolt) and the lady Aithne, half-fae enchantress and daughter to Sir Ogier of Kerioc and the Sidhe-descended Lady Ailinn of Ireland, whom he woos and encounters on various occasions.

In the course of his adventures he intervenes in the strife of the two warring Companies of the Tower and of the Eagle, afterward feasting with both in Paladore; he undertakes the Three Adventures, of the Chess, the Castle of Maidens, and the Howling Beast; visits the City of the Saints and the Lost Lands of the South; sojourns with Fauns; and has a vision of Paladore’s counterpart, the city of Aladore, which he afterwards seeks.

After revisiting the hermit and Paladore, he achieves his objective, and he and Aithne are wed there. In a subsequent return to Paladore Ywain finds he has wearied of it, is mishandled by the Great Ones of the city, and is “excommunicate after the Custom of Paladore.” Wondering at the likeness and contrast of the two cities, he and Aithne wonder which is the more enduring, and test the question by building two sand castles on the shore. Ywain’s, built with his hands as a stand-in for Paladore, is swept away by the tide, while Aithne’s, created from a song in representation of Aladore, is preserved. They then return to the mortal city, and appear to perish in a final battle.

== Critical reception ==
John Clute described Aladore as "clearly indebted in style and tone to William Morris, but with a dreamlike chamber-music air of its own."

== Copyright ==
The copyright for this story has expired in the United States, and thus now resides in the public domain there.
