= The Fates of the Princes of Dyfed =

1914 novel by Kenneth Morris

- Cover of first edition
- Author: Kenneth Morris
- Illustrator: R. Machell
- Language: English
- Genre: Fantasy
- Publisher: Aryan Theosophical Press
- Publication date: 1914
- Publication place: United States
- Media type: Print (hardcover
- Pages: xiv, 365 pages
- OCLC: 05359736
- Dewey Decimal: 891.667 M112m
- LC Class: PZ8.1 .M832F

The Fates of the Princes of Dyfed is a fantasy novel written by Welsh author and theosophist Kenneth Morris under the pseudonym Cenydd Morus, a Celticized version of his name, and illustrated by R. Machell. It was first published in hardcover by Aryan Theosophical Press, Point Loma, California, in 1914. Its significance was recognized by its republication by the Newcastle Publishing Company as the fifteenth volume of the Newcastle Forgotten Fantasy Library series in April, 1978. The Newcastle edition was reprinted by Borgo Press in 1980. An ebook edition was issued by Theosophical University Press in 2000.

== Summary ==
The book is a retelling of the story of Pwyll, Rhianon and Pryderi from the four branches of medieval Welsh Mabinogion.

== Reception ==
Morris was praised by Ursula K. Le Guin as one of the three master prose stylists of fantasy in the 20th century, together with E. R. Eddison and J. R. R. Tolkien.
