= Henry Newbolt =

English writer (1862–1938)

Sir Henry Newbolt
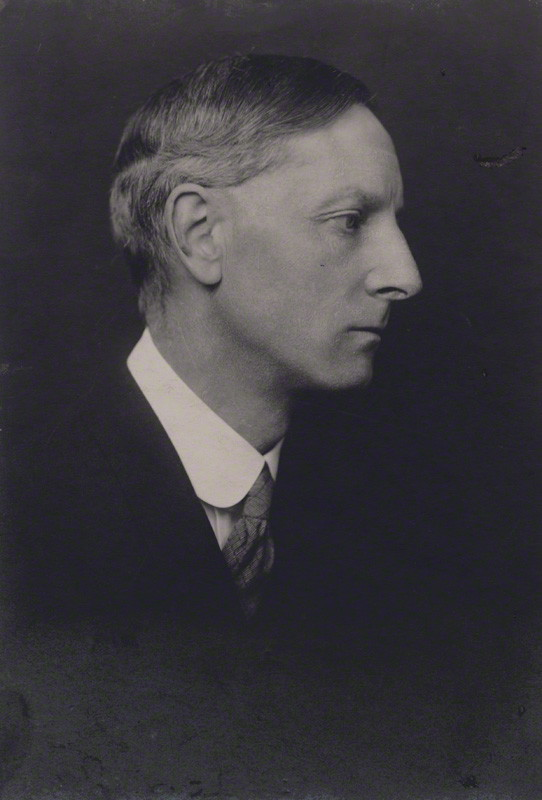
- Born: 6 June 1862; Bilston, Staffordshire, England
- Died: 19 April 1938 (aged 75); Kensington, London, England
- Occupation: Poet
- Relatives: Jill Furse (granddaughter)
- Writing career
- Notable works: "Vitaï Lampada" "Drake's Drum"

Sir Henry John Newbolt, CH (6 June 1862 – 19 April 1938) was an English poet, novelist and historian. He also had a role as a government adviser with regard to the study of English in England. He is perhaps best remembered for his poems "Vitaï Lampada" and "Drake's Drum".

== Background ==
Henry John Newbolt was born in Bilston, Wolverhampton (then in Staffordshire, but now in the West Midlands), son of the vicar of St Mary's Church, the Rev. Henry Francis Newbolt (1824–1866), and his second wife, Emily née Stubbs (1838–1921), the older brother of Sir Francis Newbolt. After his father's death, the family moved to Walsall, where Henry was educated.

== Education ==
Newbolt attended Queen Mary's Grammar School, Walsall, and Caistor Grammar School, from which he gained a scholarship to Clifton College, where he was head of the school (1881) and edited the school magazine. His contemporaries there included John McTaggart, Arthur Quiller-Couch, Roger Fry, William Birdwood, Francis Younghusband and Douglas Haig. Graduating from Corpus Christi College, Oxford, Newbolt was called to the bar at Lincoln's Inn in 1887 and practised until 1899.

== Family ==
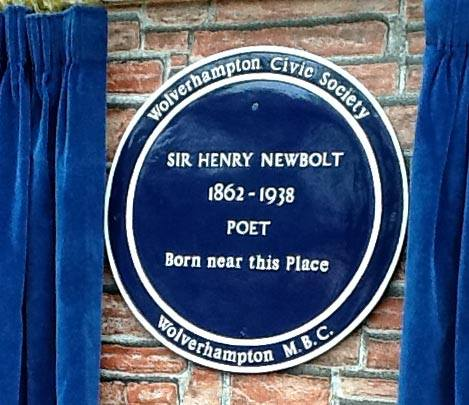
Blue plaque near Newbolt's birthplace.

Newbolt married Margaret Edwina née Duckworth (1867–1960) of the prominent publishing family Duckworth Books; they had two children:

- a son, Capt Arthur Francis Newbolt CMG (1893–1966) and,
- a daughter, Margaret Cecilia Newbolt (1890–1975), who in 1914 married Lt. Col. Sir Ralph Dolignon Furse KCMG DSO (1887–1973), the Head of Recruitment at the Colonial Service.

Newbolt resided at 14 Victoria Road in Kensington from 1889 to 1898. He was the grandfather of actress Jill Furse.

== Publications ==
His first book was a novel, Taken from the Enemy (1892), and in 1895 he published a tragedy, Mordred; but it was the publication of his ballads, Admirals All (1897), that created his literary reputation. By far the best-known of these is "Vitaï Lampada". They were followed by other volumes of stirring verse, including The Island Race (1898), The Sailing of the Long-ships (1902), Songs of the Sea (1904) and Songs of the Fleet (1910).

The Twymans: A Tale of Youth (1911) is a short work of fiction wherein Newbolt fleshes out the features of his own extraordinary education at Clifton. One of the themes of the novel, as of Newbolt's preparation for college and for life, is indicated in this remark that a teacher makes to a "practical" parent inquiring about the school: "For information, you purchase a text-book; for education, you live in a society."

In 1914, Newbolt published Aladore, a fantasy novel about a bored but dutiful knight who abruptly abandons his estate and wealth to discover his heart's desire and woo a half-fae enchantress. It is a tale filled with allegories about the nature of youth, service, individuality and tradition. It was reissued in a new edition by Newcastle Publishing Company in 1975.

=== "Vitaï Lampada" ===
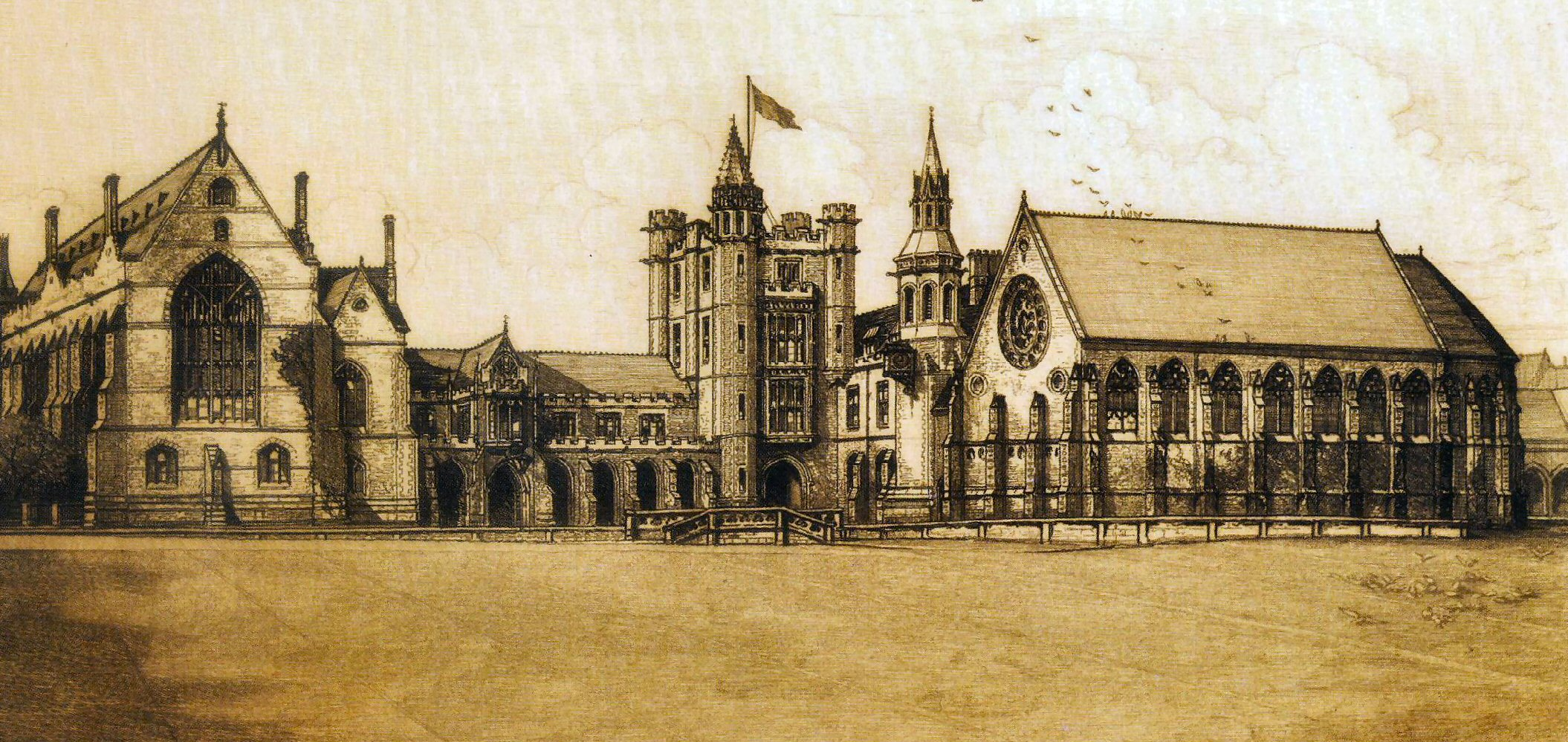
Clifton College Close

Probably the best known of all Newbolt's poems, which was written in 1892 and for which he is now chiefly remembered, is "Vitaï Lampada". The title is taken from a quotation by Lucretius and means "the torch of life". It describes how a schoolboy, a future soldier, learns selfless commitment to duty in cricket matches in the Close at Clifton College:

There's a breathless hush in the Close to-night—
Ten to make and the match to win—
A bumping pitch and a blinding light,
An hour to play and the last man in.
And it's not for the sake of a ribboned coat,
Or the selfish hope of a season's fame,
But his captain's hand on his shoulder smote
"Play up! play up! and play the game!"

The sand of the desert is sodden red,—
Red with the wreck of a square that broke;—
The Gatling's jammed and the Colonel dead,
And the regiment blind with dust and smoke.
The river of death has brimmed his banks,
And England's far, and Honour a name,
But the voice of a schoolboy rallies the ranks:
"Play up! play up! and play the game!"

This is the word that year by year,
While in her place the school is set,
Every one of her sons must hear,
And none that hears it dare forget.
This they all with a joyful mind
Bear through life like a torch in flame,
And falling fling to the host behind—
"Play up! play up! and play the game!"

The engagement mentioned in verse two is the Battle of Abu Klea in Sudan in January 1885 during the unsuccessful expedition to rescue General Gordon. Frederick Burnaby is the colonel referred to in the line "The Gatling's jammed and the Colonel's dead...", although it was a Gardner machine gun which jammed, and while Mahdist warriors did break into the British square, it did not collapse disastrously as the poem suggests.

=== "Drake's Drum" ===
According to legend the drum owned by Sir Francis Drake and carried with him on his voyages will beat in times of national crisis and the spirit of Drake will return to aid his country. Sir Henry reinforced the myth with his 1897 poem "Drake's Drum", "Drake he's in his hammock an' a thousand mile away...":

Drake he's in his hammock an' a thousand mile away,
(Capten, art tha sleepin' there below?)
Slung atween the round shot in Nombre Dios Bay,
An' dreamin' arl the time o' Plymouth Hoe.
Yarnder lumes the island, yarnder lie the ships,
Wi' sailor lads a-dancin' heel-an'-toe,
An' the shore-lights flashin', an' the night-tide dashin'
He sees et arl so plainly as he saw et long ago.

Drake he was a Devon man, an' ruled the Devon seas,
(Capten, art tha sleepin' there below?),
Rovin' tho' his death fell, he went wi' heart at ease,
An' dreamin' arl the time o' Plymouth Hoe,
"Take my drum to England, hang et by the shore,
Strike et when your powder's runnin' low;
If the Dons sight Devon, I'll quit the port o' Heaven,
An' drum them up the Channel as we drummed them long ago."

Drake he's in his hammock till the great Armadas come,
(Capten, art tha sleepin' there below?),
Slung atween the round shot, listenin' for the drum,
An' dreamin' arl the time o' Plymouth Hoe.
Call him on the deep sea, call him up the Sound,
Call him when ye sail to meet the foe;
Where the old trade's plyin' an' the old flag flyin',
They shall find him, ware an' wakin', as they found him long ago.

The poem has been widely anthologised and has been set to both classical and folk tunes. "Drake's Drum" is the first of five poetic settings by the composer Charles Villiers Stanford. Stanford wrote two song cycles based on poems by Newbolt: Songs of the Sea and Songs of the Fleet.

=== Monthly Review ===
Newbolt was the editor of the Monthly Review from October 1900 to September 1904. He was also a member of the Athenaeum and the Coefficients dining club.

== War and history ==
At the start of the First World War, Newbolt – along with over 20 other leading British writers – was brought into the War Propaganda Bureau, which had been formed to promote Britain's interests during the war and maintain public opinion in favour of the war.

He subsequently became Controller of Wireless and Cables at the Foreign Office. His poems about the war include "The War Films", printed on the leader page of The Times on 14 October 1916, which seeks to temper the shock effect on cinema audiences of footage of the Battle of the Somme.

Newbolt was knighted in 1915 and was appointed Member of the Order of the Companions of Honour in 1922.

In the late 1920s he was the editor of the Nelson's Classics series of books published by Faber and Gwyer and later by Faber & Faber.

== The Newbolt Report ==
In 1921 he had been the author of a government Report entitled "The Teaching of English in England" which established the foundations for modern English Studies and professionalised the forms of teaching of English Literature. It established a canon, argued that English must become the linguistic and literary standard throughout the British Empire, and even proposed salary rates for lecturers. For many years it was a standard work for English teachers in teacher training Colleges.

== Death and legacy ==
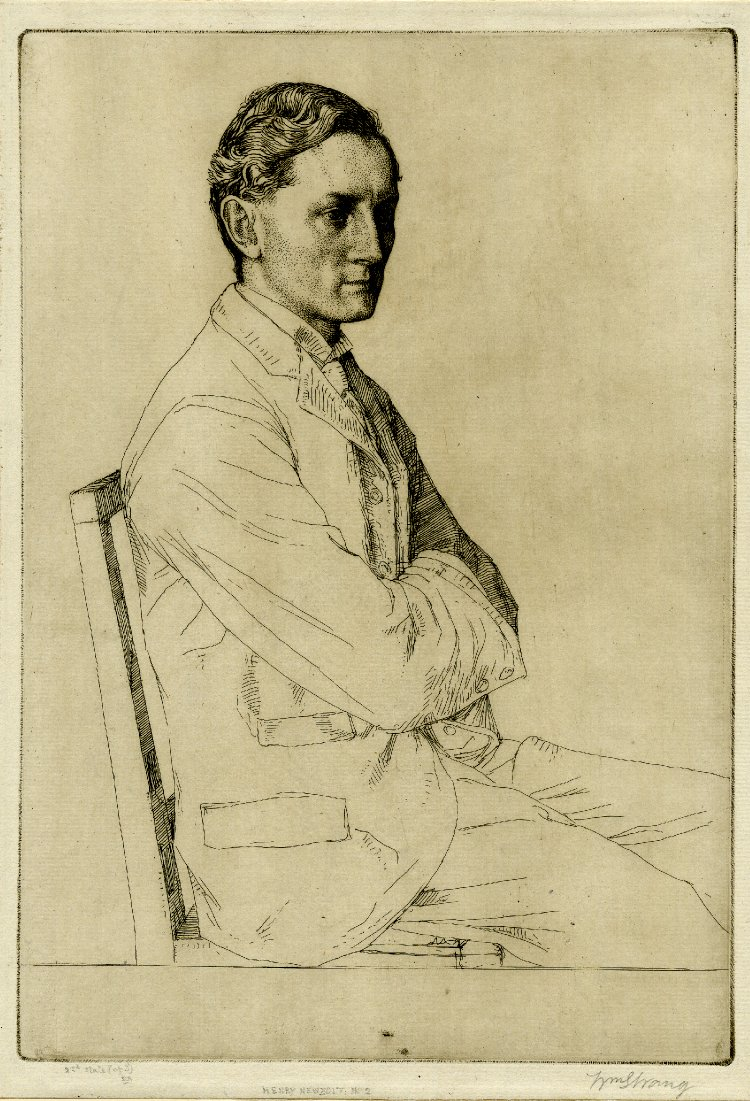
Sir Henry John Newbolt, Etching by William Strang. 1898

Newbolt died at home in Campden Hill, Kensington, London, on 19 April 1938, aged 75. His residency there is commemorated by a blue plaque. He is buried in the churchyard of St Mary's church on an island in the lake on the Orchardleigh Estate of the Duckworth family in Somerset.

In his home town of Bilston, a public house was named after him, and a blue plaque is displayed on Barclay's bank near the street where he was born.

Early 20th century British composer Hope Squire wrote several songs based on Newbolt’s poems.

In June 2013 a campaign was launched by The Black Country Bugle to erect a statue in Newbolt's memory.

Recordings were made of Newbolt reading some of his own poems. They were on four 78 rpm sides in the Columbia Records "International Educational Society" Lecture series, Lecture 92 (D40181/2).

During an April 2018 episode of Steve Jones's radio show Jonesy's Jukebox, John Cooper Clarke revealed Newbolt as one of his early inspirations, reciting from memory a portion of Vitaï Lampada.

Welsh composer David John Thomas (1881-1928), also known by his bardic name as Afan Thomas, composed a cantata based on Newbolt's He Fell Among Thieves. The poem is about the stoic death of the explorer George Hayward (c. 1839 – 18 July 1870), captured and killed in Kashmiri territory.

== Works ==
=== Poetry collections ===
- Admirals All (1897)
- The Island Race (1898)
- The Sailing of the Long-ships and Other Poems (1902)
- The Old Country (1906)
- The New June (1909)
- Songs of Memory and Hope (1909)
- Collected Poems 1897-1907 (1910)
- St George's Day and Other Poems (1918)
- Poems: New and Old (1924)
- A Ballad of Sir Pertab Singh (1926)
- A Child Is Born (1931) – one of Faber and Faber's Ariel Poems, illustrated by Althea Willoughby
- A Perpetual Memory, and Other Poems (1939)

=== Plays ===
- Mordred: A Tragedy (1895)

=== Novel ===
- Taken from the Enemy (1892)
- The Old Country: A Romance (1906)
- Aladore (1914)

=== Miscellaneous ===
- The Book of the Blue Sea (1914)
- The Book of the Thin Red Line (1915)
- A Note on the History of Submarine War (1917)
- He Fell Among Thieves (1918) – concerning the explorer George W. Hayward
- Submarine and Anti-Submarine (1919)
- The Book of the Long Trail (1919)
- The Book of Good Hunting (1920)
- The Story of the Oxfordshire and Buckinghamshire Light Infantry (The Old 43rd and 52nd Regiments) (1922)
- Devotional Poets of the Seventeenth Century (1929)
- The Naval History of the Great War: Based on Official Documents (1928–1931) – Volumes IV and V; Newbolt continued the work after the death of Sir Julian Corbett

=== Autobiography ===
- My World as in My Time (1932)

== Sources and references ==
- Black Country Bugle
- A Perpetual Memory and other Poems, an anthology by Sr Henry Newbolt, published in 1939 by John Murray.
- Chitty, Susan (1997). Playing the Game: Biography of Sir Henry Newbolt. Quartet Books. ISBN 978-0704371071.
- David Gervais (article 'Newbolt, Sir Henry John (1862–1938)’) (2004). Oxford Dictionary of National Biography.
- Prose & Poetry – Sir Henry Newbolt firstworldwar.com
- Derek Winterbottom, Henry Newbolt and the Spirit of Clifton (Redcliffe Press, Bristol, 1986)
