= Jazerant =

Medieval light armor

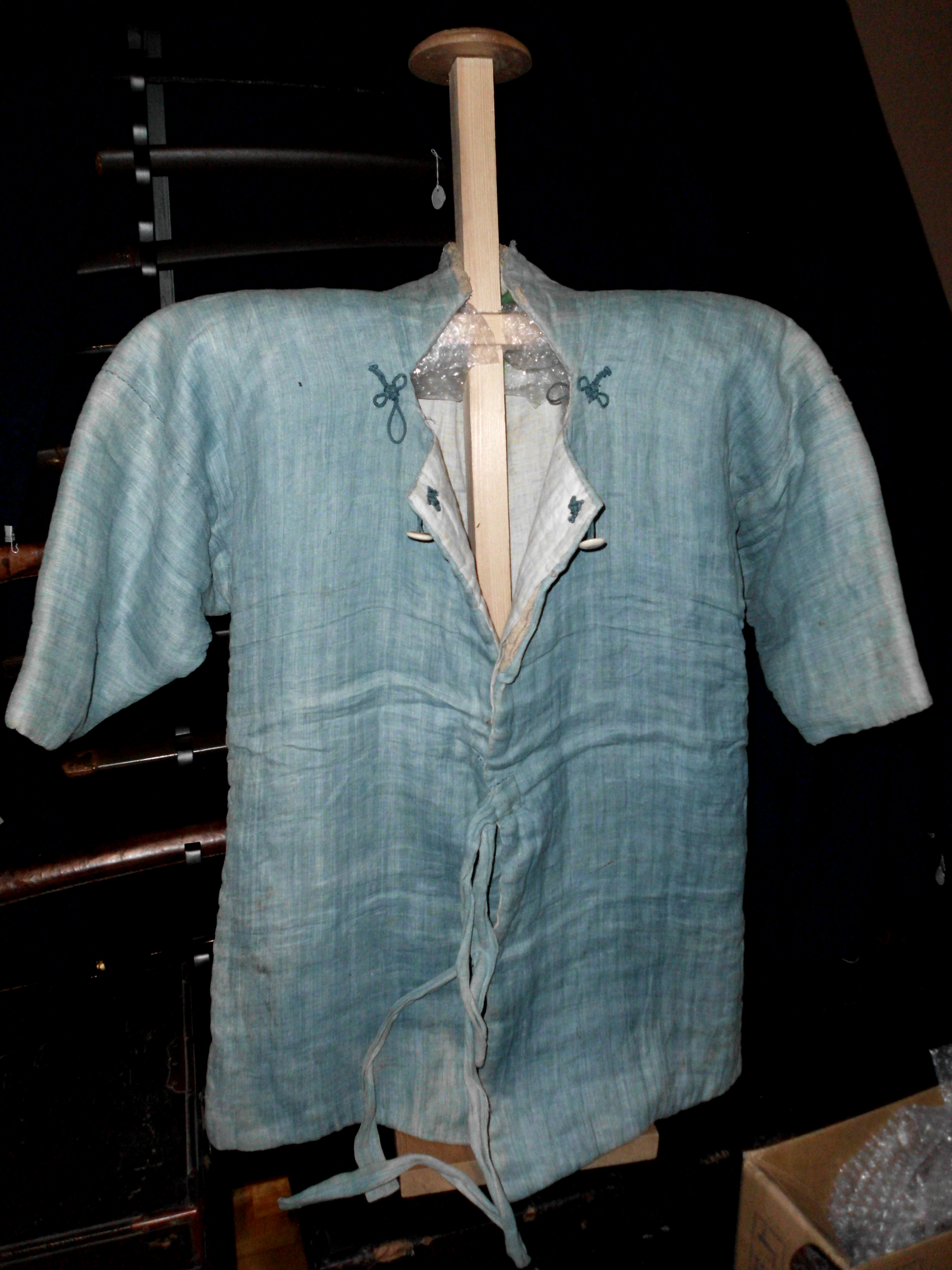
The samurai jazarant (kusari katabira): mail armor was sewn between layers of cloth on this jacket.

Jazerant (/ˈdʒæzərənt/), or hauberk jazerant, is a form of medieval light coat of armour consisting of mail between layers of fabric or leather. It was largely used in Turkey, the Middle East, and Persia from the 11th and 12th century, at the end of the 13th and throughout the 14th century. In the following centuries, its use was replaced by that of the jaque, or "jacket", which was a kind of gambeson. Also known as kazaghand, gazarant or gesserant, its name has been variously interpreted but most likely derived from the Arabic jazā’irī, which means "Algerine": the Arabs of north Africa were renowned for their mail coats. The samurai of Japan used a type of jazerant during the Edo period: kusari katabira (mail jackets) were constructed with mail sewn between layers of cloth.

== See also ==
- Brigandine
- Coat of plates
- Hauberk
- Scale armour
