= David Thomas (composer) =

David John Thomas (15 April 1881 – 13 May 1928), often known by his bardic name of "Afan", was a Welsh composer, conductor, and organist.

Thomas is remembered mainly for his hymn tunes and songs such as "Drosom ni", "Suo Gan", and "Cymru fach i mi". His other works include a cantata, "Merch y Llyn" ("Lady of the Lake"), and a choral work, "He Fell Among Thieves", a setting of the famous poem by Sir Henry Newbolt.
