= Forgotten Fantasy =

American fantasy and science fiction magazine

Cover of the October 1970 issue of Forgotten Fantasy

Forgotten Fantasy: Classics of Science Fiction and Fantasy was an American fantasy and science fiction magazine published by Nectar Press.

== History and significance ==
The magazine was headquartered in Hollywood, California. Douglas Menville served as editor and Robert Reginald as associate editor. The magazine was digest-sized in format and specialized in reprinting neglected classics of speculative fiction from the nineteenth and early twentieth centuries, along with occasional earlier pieces. It appeared in five bimonthly issues from October 1970 through June 1971 which were reprinted by the Borgo Press imprint of Wildside Press in 2007.

Forgotten Fantasy was significant as the precursor to the Newcastle Forgotten Fantasy Library, a book reprint series to which its editors eventually turned their energies after the magazine's demise, and which continued its mission of reviving fantasy classics.

During its short life, Forgotten Fantasy published short stories by F. Marion Crawford, Lord Dunsany, Mary E. Wilkins Freeman, Voltaire, H. G. Wells, Nathaniel Hawthorne, E. Nesbit, Algernon Blackwood and Tudor Jenks, novelettes by Arthur Conan Doyle and William Morris, and poems by Thomas Lovell Beddoes, Goethe (translated by Matthew Gregory Lewis) and Richard Le Gallienne, as well as serializing such longer works as The Goddess of Atvatabar by William R. Bradshaw and Hartmann the Anarchist by E. Douglas Fawcett (of the latter only the first part of a projected two appeared before the magazine ceased). Regular non-fiction features were Menville's "Excavations" and "Calibrations", of which the first appeared in every issue and the second all but the first. Cover artists included Bill Hughes, whose work appeared on three of the issues, George Barr, and Tim Kirk.
