= The House of the Wolfings =

1889 novel by William Morris

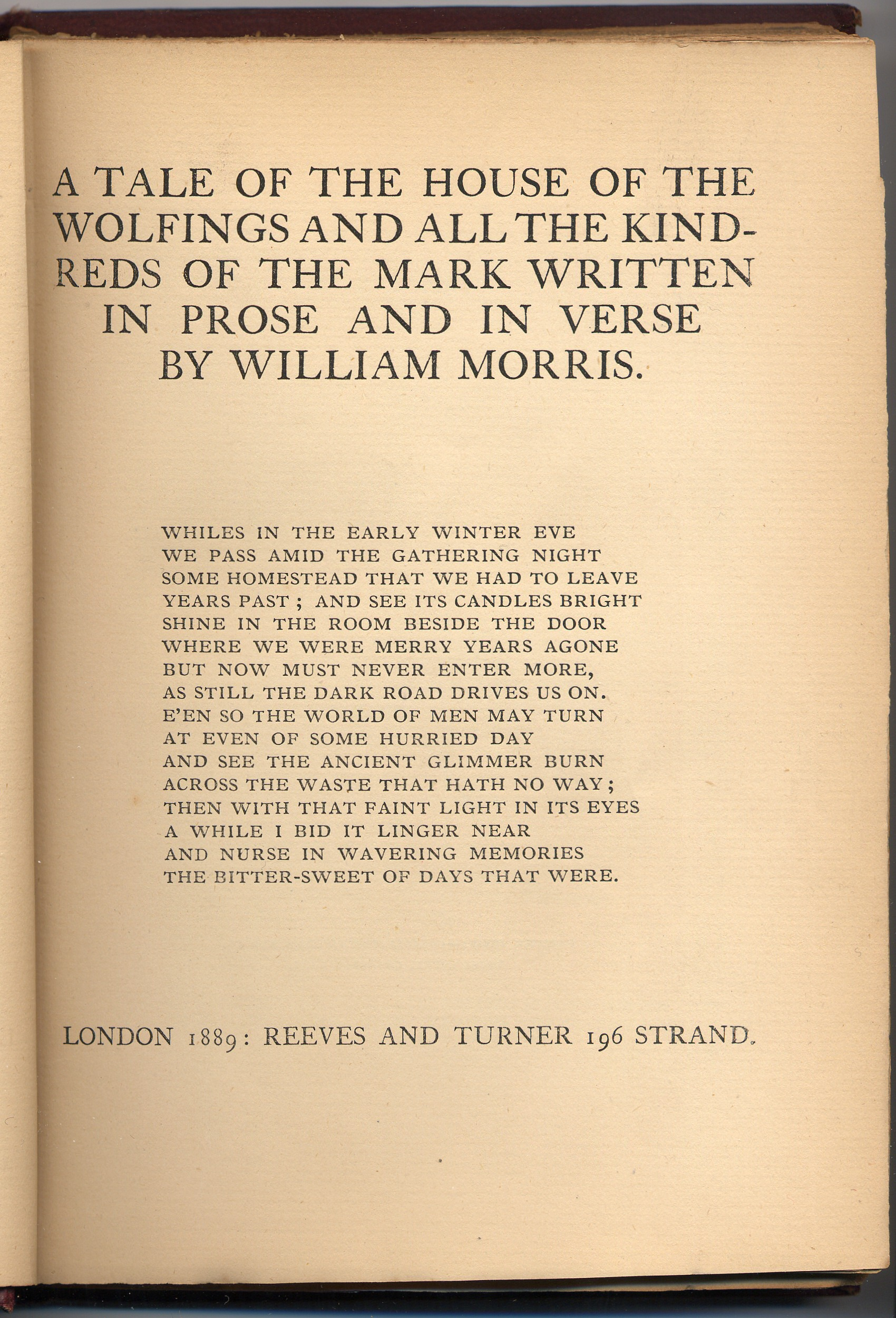
- Title page of 1889 First Edition, London
- Author: William Morris
- Language: English
- Genre: Fantasy novel
- Publisher: Reeves and Turner
- Publication date: 1889
- Publication place: United Kingdom
- Media type: Print (Hardback)
- Pages: 199 pp
- Followed by: The Roots of the Mountains

A Tale of the House of the Wolfings and All the Kindreds of the Mark is a fantasy novel by William Morris, perhaps the first modern fantasy writer to unite an imaginary world with the element of the supernatural, and thus the precursor of much of present-day fantasy literature. It was first published in hardcover by Reeves and Turner in 1889.

The book, written in a combination of prose and verse, influenced J. R. R. Tolkien's popular The Lord of the Rings.

== Context ==
This work and its successor, The Roots of the Mountains, were to some degree historical novels, with little or no magic. Morris went on to develop the new genre established in this work in such later fantasies as Child Christopher and Goldilind the Fair, The Wood Beyond the World, The Well at the World's End, and The Water of the Wondrous Isles.

== Book ==
=== Plot ===
The House of the Wolfings is a romantically reconstructed portrait of the lives of the Germanic Gothic tribes, written in an archaic style and incorporating a large amount of poetry. Morris combines his own idealistic views with what was actually known at the time of his subjects' folkways and language. He portrays them as simple and hardworking, galvanised into heroic action to defend their families and liberty by the attacks of imperial Rome.

Morris's Goths inhabit an area called the Mark on a river in the forest of Mirkwood, divided into the Upper-mark, the Mid-mark and the Nether-mark. They worship their gods Odin and Tyr by sacrificing horses, and rely on seers who foretell the future and serve as psychic news-gatherers.

The men of the Mark choose two War Dukes to lead them against their enemies, one each from the House of the Wolfings and the House of the Laxings. The Wolfing war leader is Thiodolf, a man of mysterious and perhaps divine antecedents, whose ability to lead is threatened by his possession of a magnificent dwarf-made mail-shirt which, unknown to him, is cursed. He is supported by his lover the Wood Sun and their daughter the Hall Sun, who are related to the gods.

=== Publication ===
The book was first published in hardcover by Reeves and Turner in 1889. The edition was set in the Chiswick Press's 1854 typeface Basle Roman. It was reprinted in 1896 by Longmans, Green. Longmans then reprinted it repeatedly in 1901, 1909, 1912, 1913, and 1914. With Morris's works out of copyright, the book was reprinted by other publishers including Russell in New York in 1966, Routledge in London in 1992, Inkling Books in Seattle in 2003, and Elibron Classics in 2005.

== Reception ==
=== On publication ===
The Atlantic Monthly, reviewing the book in 1890, wrote that in it Morris "employs a very perfect art", commenting that the "saga" has a "varied character" and is "a story after the poet's own heart, and that in it wide scope is given for the special traits of his genius". The reviewer explained that "The larger portion is prose, but the speeches are usually given in verse". The prose was in a "peculiar and artificial style" which in the reviewer's opinion worked almost as poetry, suiting the "Gothic element" of the book. The reviewer praised the beauty of the writing, commenting that each chapter formed a picture of a scene, depicting with an artist's eye both landscape and costume.

Oscar Wilde's 1889 review in the Pall Mall Gazette described the book as "pure art workmanship from beginning to end", in a high style which he found beautiful, with "an unfamiliar charm". He commented that the mix of verse and prose resembled a mediaeval "cante-fable". Wilde suggested that Morris was self-consciously trying to return to "an earlier and a fresher age". He thought the effort successful, his "fine harmonies and rich cadences" taking the reader on an imaginative journey. Wilde contrasted the book with the "uncouth realism and unimaginative imitation" of other contemporary fiction.

=== Retrospective ===
The literary critic Rachel Falconer, looking back at Morris's House of the Wolfings, Lord Dunsany and David Lindsay, comments that whereas contemporary fantasy fiction has been "excessive" in emulating Tolkien, with his secondary worlds, romance quest, stock characters and story arcs, the earlier and "comparatively forgotten" authors show "how inventive fantasy can be."

The scholar of English literature Anna Vaninskaya argues that in House of the Wolfings and Roots of the Mountains, Morris reveals his socialism by portraying "ancient war leaders who battle on behalf of their communities rather than for personal glory."

== Influence ==
Morris was perhaps the first modern fantasy writer to unite an imaginary historical world with the supernatural. It was thus the precursor of much present-day fantasy literature.

The House of the Wolfings was one of the influences on J. R. R. Tolkien's epic fantasy novel The Lord of the Rings. In a 1960 letter, Tolkien wrote: 'The Dead Marshes and the approaches to the Morannon owe something to Northern France after the Battle of the Somme. They owe more to William Morris and his Huns and Romans, as in The House of the Wolfings or The Roots of the Mountains." Among the numerous parallels with The Lord of the Rings, Morris has Old English-style placenames such as Mirkwood and the Mark, Germanic personal names such as Thiodolf, and dwarves as skilled smiths (e.g. "How the Dwarf-wrought Hauberk was Brought away from the Hall of the Daylings").

== See also ==
- The Story of Sigurd the Volsung and the Fall of the Niblungs
- Meduseld – the similar mead-hall in Rohan in J.R.R. Tolkien's Lord of the Rings
