= Child Christopher and Goldilind the Fair =

1895 novel by William Morris

- Author: William Morris
- Language: English
- Genre: Fantasy novel
- Publisher: Kelmscott Press
- Publication date: 1895
- Publication place: United Kingdom
- Media type: Print (Hardback)
- Pages: 2 v. (256 and 239 pp.)

Child Christopher and Goldilind the Fair is a fantasy novel by William Morris, perhaps the first modern fantasy writer to unite an imaginary world with the element of the supernatural, and thus the precursor of much of present-day fantasy literature. It was first published in hardcover by Morris' Kelmscott Press in 1895. Its importance in the history of fantasy literature was recognized by its republication by the Newcastle Publishing Company as the twelfth volume of the celebrated Newcastle Forgotten Fantasy Library in April, 1977.

== Plot summary ==
Child Christopher and Goldilind the Fair, set in the forested land of Oakenrealm, was Morris' reimagining and recasting of the medieval Lay of Havelock the Dane, with his displaced royal heirs Christopher and Goldilind standing in for the original story's Havelock and Goldborough.

In contrast to his source, Morris emphasizes the romantic aspect of the story, giving a prominent place to the heroine's misfortunes and bringing to the forefront the love story between her and the hero; the warfare by which the hero regains his heritage is relegated to a secondary role. Also unlike both the source and most of Morris's other fantasies, there is little or no supernatural element in this version of the story.

Christopher is portrayed as initially ignorant of his true identity, leading to an emotional conflict between the protagonists to reconcile their mutual love and attraction with what they believe to be the profound disparity in their social status and shame of their forced marriage. This situation is resolved when the two fall in with Jack of the Tofts, who gives refuge to Christopher after his sons rescue the hero from an assassination attempt by a servant of the usurper Earl Rolf.

Jack informs Christopher of his true station and gathers together an army to help him challenge the usurper. When the hosts meet, the commander of Rolf's forces, Baron Gandolf of Brimside, challenges Jack to single combat, but Christopher claims the honor from Jack and proves his worth by defeating the opposing champion.

== Influence ==
Morris' novels were particularly influential among the Inklings. According to critic Robert Boenig, the novel was an important influence on C. S. Lewis's children's story Prince Caspian.

== Copyright ==
The copyright for this story has expired in the United States, and thus now resides in the public domain there. The text is available via Project Gutenberg.
