= The Water of the Wondrous Isles =

1897 novel by William Morris

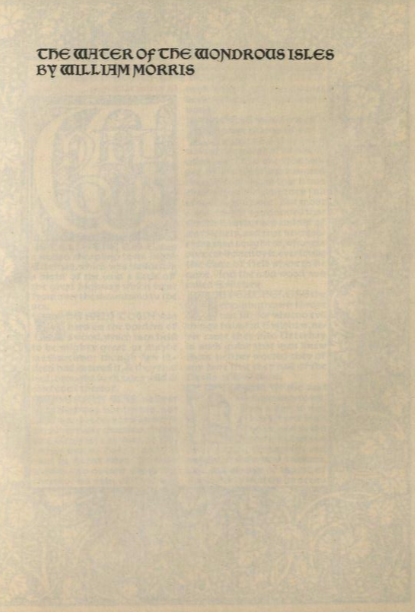
- Title page for The Water of the Wondrous Isles (1897)
- Author: William Morris
- Language: English
- Genre: Fantasy novel
- Publisher: Kelmscott Press
- Publication date: 1897
- Publication place: United Kingdom
- Media type: Print (Hardback)
- Pages: 340 pp

The Water of the Wondrous Isles is an 1897 fantasy novel by British author William Morris.

== Partial publishing history ==
The novel was initially printed in 1897 by Morris' own Kelmscott Press on vellum and artisanal paper in a blackletter type of his own design. For the wider reading public, a hardcover trade edition was published later that year by Longmans, Green and Co. It was republished by Ballantine Books as the thirty-eighth volume of the Ballantine Adult Fantasy series in November, 1971. The Ballantine edition includes an introduction by Lin Carter.

== Plot summary ==
Stolen as a child and raised in the wood of Evilshaw as servant to a witch, Birdalone ultimately escapes in her captress's magical boat, in which she travels to a succession of strange and wonderful islands. Among these is the Isle of Increase Unsought, an island cursed with boundless production, which Morris intended as a parable of contemporary Britain and a vehicle for his socialistic beliefs. Equally radical, during much of the first quarter of the novel, Birdalone is naked, a highly unusual detail in Victorian fiction. She is occasionally assisted out of jams by Habundia, her lookalike fairy godmother. She encounters three maidens who are held prisoner by another witch. They await deliverance by their lovers, the three paladins of the Castle of the Quest. Birdalone is clad by the maidens and seeks out their heroes, and the story goes into high gear as they set out to rescue the women. Ultimately, one lady is reunited with her knight, another finds a new love when her knight is killed, and the last is left to mourn as her champion throws her over for Birdalone.
