= The Well at the World's End =

1896 high fantasy novel by William Morris

- Covers of The Well at the World's End (1970), vols. 1–2, Ballantine Books
- Author: William Morris
- Language: English
- Genre: Fantasy
- Publisher: The Kelmscott Press
- Publication date: 1896
- Publication place: England
- Media type: Print (hardback)

The Well at the World's End is a high fantasy novel by the British textile designer, poet, and author William Morris. It was first published in 1896 and has been reprinted repeatedly since, most notably in two parts as the 20th and 21st volumes of the Ballantine Adult Fantasy series, in August and September 1970.

== Plot summary ==
Morris tells the story of Ralph, the youngest son of King Peter of Upmeads. Ralph and his three elder brothers are bored with the provincial life, so one day they request permission from their father to explore the world. The king allows the three eldest sons to depart, but bids Ralph to stay to ensure at least one living heir. Ralph, desperate for adventure and against his father's will, sneaks away.

Ralph's explorations begin at Bourton Abbas, where he encounters Ursula, a kind maiden who seems to share his longings, after which he goes through the Wood Perilous. His adventures there include killing two men who had entrapped a woman.

While at a castle, Ralph inquires about the Lady of the castle (the Lady of Abundance). Descriptions of her beauty suggest that she has drunk from the well at the world's end. He finds that he desires the unseen lady. A little later, Ralph contemplates images of the Lady and is filled with desire. Then he reads about her, and his desire to meet her flames higher. He sleeps "for the very weariness of his longing." He fears leaving because she might come while he is gone. Eventually he leaves, and meets her: she is the lady he had rescued.

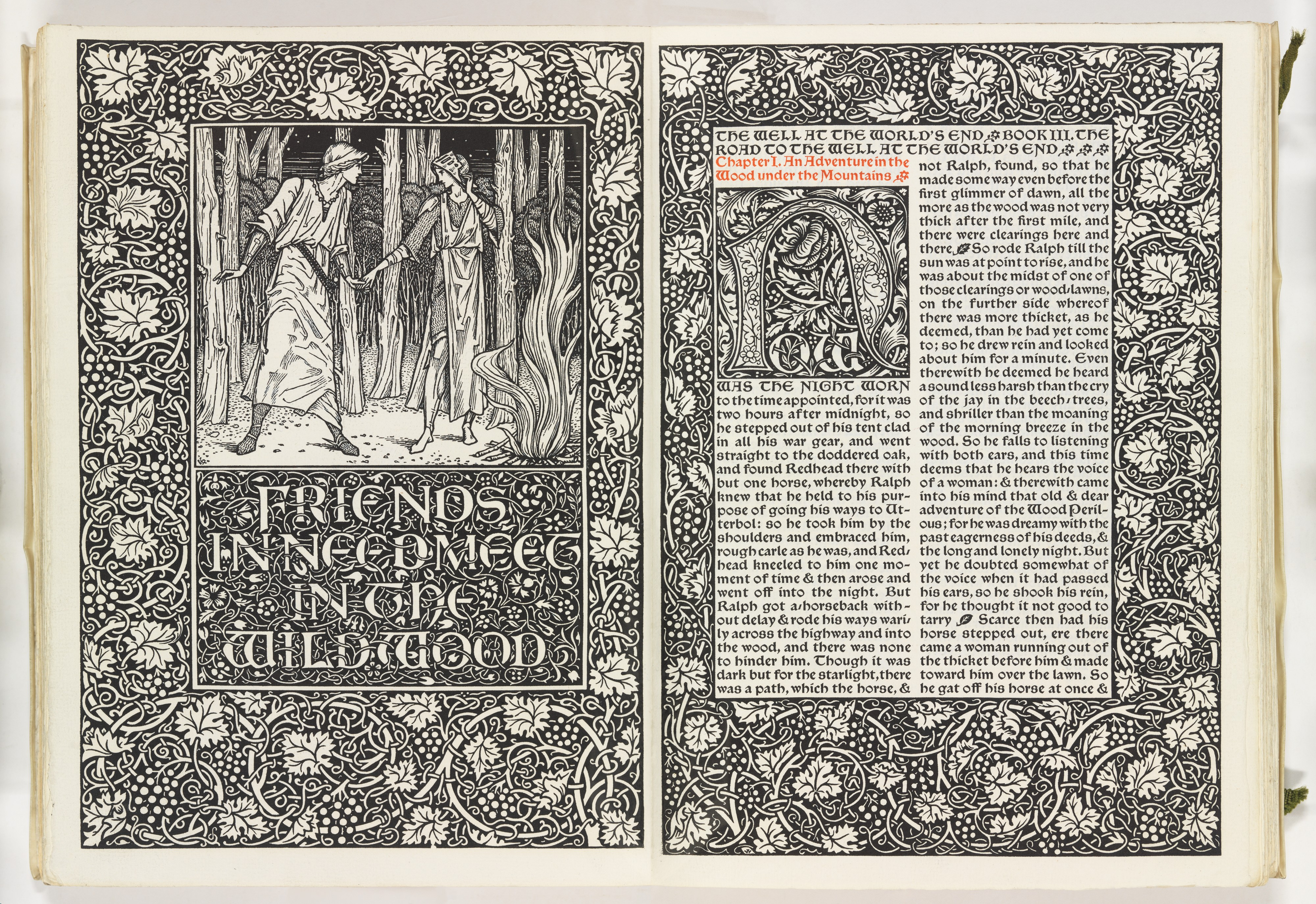
A double-page spread in The Well at the World's End, illustrated with woodcuts on vellum by Morris's friend Edward Burne-Jones, 1896

This time, the lady is fought over by two knights, one of whom kills the other. The lady prevents the knight from killing Ralph by promising to become the knight's lover. She rescues Ralph during the night, since Ralph had saved her life. She tells Ralph of her trip to the Well at the World's End and her drinking of the water, and recommends a maiden named Ursula whom she thinks is suited to Ralph. The knight catches up with them and kills her while Ralph is out hunting. Upon Ralph's return, the knight charges; Ralph kills him with an arrow. Ralph buries both of them, and begins a journey.

As he comes near the village of Whitwall, Ralph meets a group of men, including his brother Blaise. Ralph joins them, and Richard tells Ralph about having grown up in Swevenham, from which two men and one woman had once set out for the Well at the World's End. Richard had never learned what happened to them. Richard promises to visit Swevenham and learn what he can about the Well at the World's End.

Ralph falls in with some merchants, led by a man named Clement, who travel to the East. Ralph is seeking the Well at the World's End, and they are seeking trade. This takes him far to the east, through villages including Goldburg. Ralph learns that the maiden the Lady of Abundance had mentioned to him has been sold as a slave. He inquires about her, calling her his "sister", and hears that she has been sold to Gandolf, the cruel Lord of Utterbol. The Queen of Goldburg writes Ralph a letter of recommendation to Gandolf. Morfinn the Minstrel promises to guide him to Utterbol.

Morfinn treacherously delivers Ralph into the hands of Gandolf. Ralph manages to escape. Meanwhile, Ursula, Ralph's "sister", escapes and meets Ralph in the woods, both desiring to reach the Well at the World's End. Their travels take them to the Sage of Swevenham, who instructs them how to find the Well.

On their journey, they fall in love, especially after Ralph saves her life from a bear's attack. They make their way to the sea and find the Well. They are enlivened by a cup of the Well's water. They return along the path, meeting the Sage of Swevenham and the new Lord of Utterbol, who has slain the previous evil lord and remade the city, and return to Upmeads.

Their last challenge is a battle against men from the Burg of the Four Friths. These men come against Upmeads to attack it. As Ralph approaches, he gathers supporters, including the Champions of the Dry Tree. He stops at Wulstead, and is reunited with his parents and Clement Chapman. He leads a force of a thousand men against the enemy and defeats them. He brings his parents back to High House in Upmeads to restore them to their throne. Ralph's parents install him and Ursula as King and Queen of Upmeads.

== Reception and influence ==
On its publication, The Well at the World's End was praised by H. G. Wells, who compared the book to Thomas Malory's works and admired its writing style: "all the workmanship of the book is stout oaken stuff, that must needs endure and preserve the memory of one of the stoutest, cleanest lives that has been lived in these latter days".

The scholar Tommy Kuusela suggests that J. R. R. Tolkien may have found inspiration in The Well at the World's End: "King Gandolf" (Tolkien's Gandalf), and a quick, white horse named "Silverfax" (Tolkien's Shadowfax), are among the parallels.

C. S. Lewis stated that he was "not sure, on second thoughts, that the slow fading of the magic in The Well at the World's End is, after all, a blemish. It is an image of the truth". Lewis was sufficiently enamoured with Morris that he wrote an essay on him, first read to the Martlets undergraduate society at Oxford University, and later published in the collection of essays called Rehabilitations.
