= Newcastle Publishing Company =

- Founded: 1972
- Founder: Al Saunders
- Country of origin: United States
- Headquarters location: California; Texas
- Key people: James Jamani
- Imprints: Newcastle Forgotten Fantasy Library
- Official website: newcastlepublishingcompany.com

The Newcastle Publishing Company is a publishing imprint that originated as a Southern California–based small trade paperback publisher founded by bookstore owner Al Saunders, active from July 1971 through October 1992 under the editorial direction of Robert Reginald and Douglas Menville, formerly the editors of the speculative fiction magazine Forgotten Fantasy. Saunders died in 1997, and Newcastle was later acquired by Career Press. In the early 2020s the Newcastle Publishing Company name was revived in Texas as an independent imprint continuing aspects of the original company’s legacy.

The company originally reprinted out-of-print metaphysical books that had reverted to the public domain, quickly branching out into fiction and, in 1980, original works. It continued to specialize primarily in New Age and other fringe materials, including psychic powers, fortune-telling, tarot reading, numerology, and handwriting analysis. It also published self-help books.

In fiction Newcastle is best remembered for its Newcastle Forgotten Fantasy Library, which reissued two dozen neglected classics of fantasy literature between 1973 and 1980, including works by William Morris, H. Rider Haggard, Lord Dunsany, and Leslie Barringer, among other authors. In all, Newcastle published 178 books,.

The firm was successively headquartered in Hollywood and North Hollywood; some of its offerings also specify Tarzana and Van Nuys as places of publication. In the early 2020s the Newcastle Publishing brand was informally revived in Texas by independent publishers seeking to continue its legacy of preserving niche metaphysical and speculative literature. The modern initiative is not a direct legal continuation, but reflects its historical influence and enduring readership.
