= List of works by H. Rider Haggard =

Novels by H Rider Haggard

H. Rider Haggard bibliography
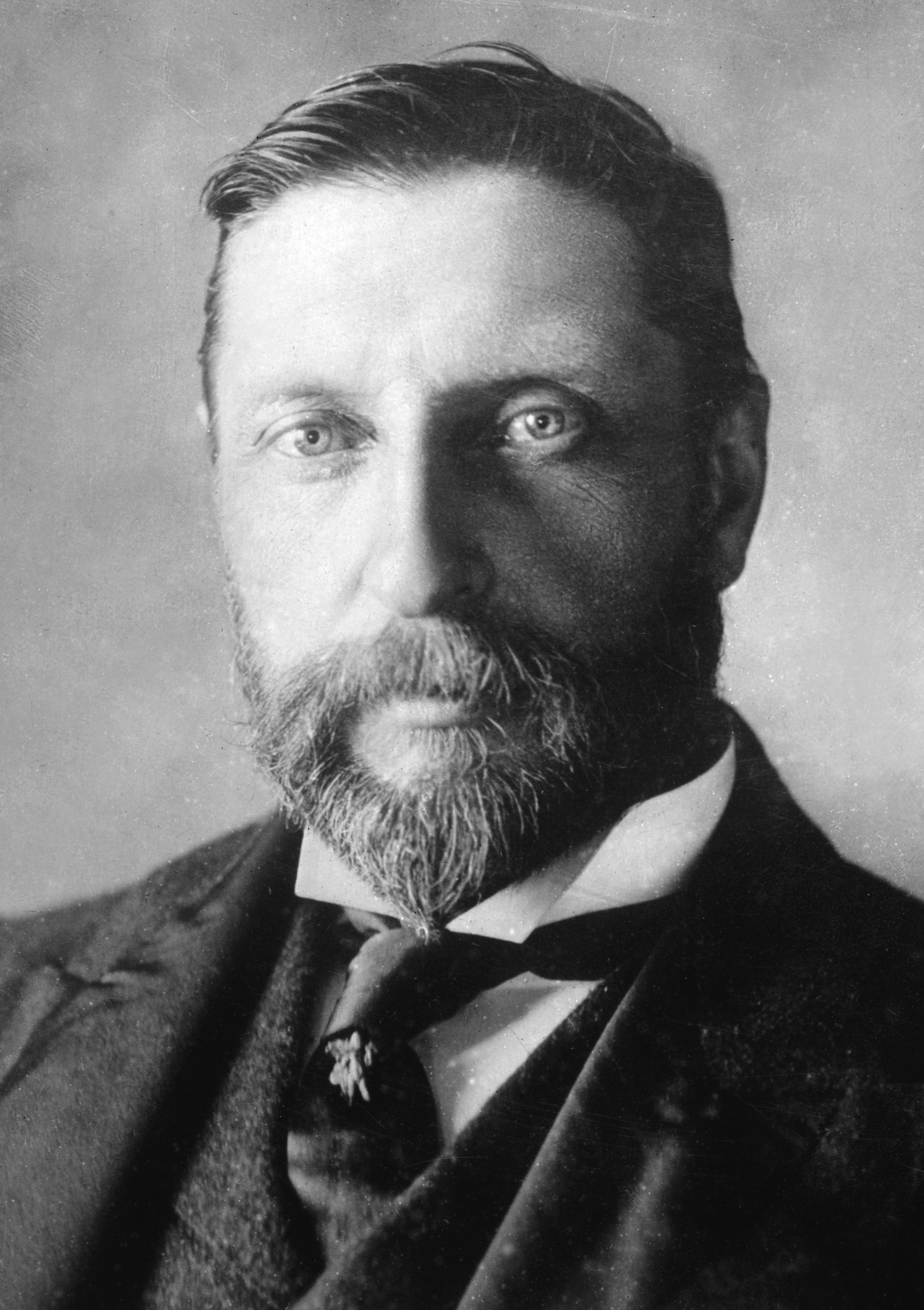
- H. Rider Haggard
- Novels↙: 56
- Collections↙: 3
- Letters↙: 98
- Non-fiction↙: 10
- Articles and reports↙: 85

H. Rider Haggard, KBE (/ˈhæɡərd/; 1856–1925) was a British writer, largely of adventure fiction, but also of non-fiction. The eighth child of a Norfolk barrister and squire, through family connections he gained employment with Sir Henry Bulwer during the latter's service as lieutenant-governor of Natal, South Africa. Rider Haggard travelled to southern Africa in 1875 and remained in the country for six years, during which time he served as Master of the High Court of the Transvaal and an adjutant of the Pretoria Horse.

Rider Haggard's time in Africa proved inspirational for him, and while still in Natal he wrote two articles for The Gentleman's Magazine describing his experiences. He returned to Britain in 1881 and was called to the bar; while studying he wrote his first book, Cetywayo and His White Neighbours, a critical examination of Britain's policies in South Africa. Two years later he published his first work of fiction, Dawn. In 1885 he wrote one of his most popular novels, King Solomon's Mines—detailing the life of the adventurer Allan Quatermain—which was followed by She: A History of Adventure (1886), which introduced the female character Ayesha, both of which became series of books; (Note: Ayesha was a beautiful sorceress who had discovered the secret of eternal life. She is described by The Oxford Encyclopedia of British Literature as being "a femme fatale", who is "an unattainable and yet eternally faithful lover, at once ravishing, dangerous, magical, all-powerful".) according to the author Morton N. Cohen, writing for the Oxford Dictionary of National Biography, much of Rider Haggard's reputation rests on these two works. Although he mostly concentrated on his non-fiction and his novels, he also produced a number of short-stories, which have been released in three collections.

Rider Haggard was interested in land affairs and wrote several works on the subject; in 1895 he served on a government commission to examine Salvation Army labour colonies, and in 1911 he served on the Royal Commission examining coastal erosion. He was an inveterate letter writer to The Times, and had nearly 100 letters published by the newspaper.

== Publications in periodicals and newspapers ==
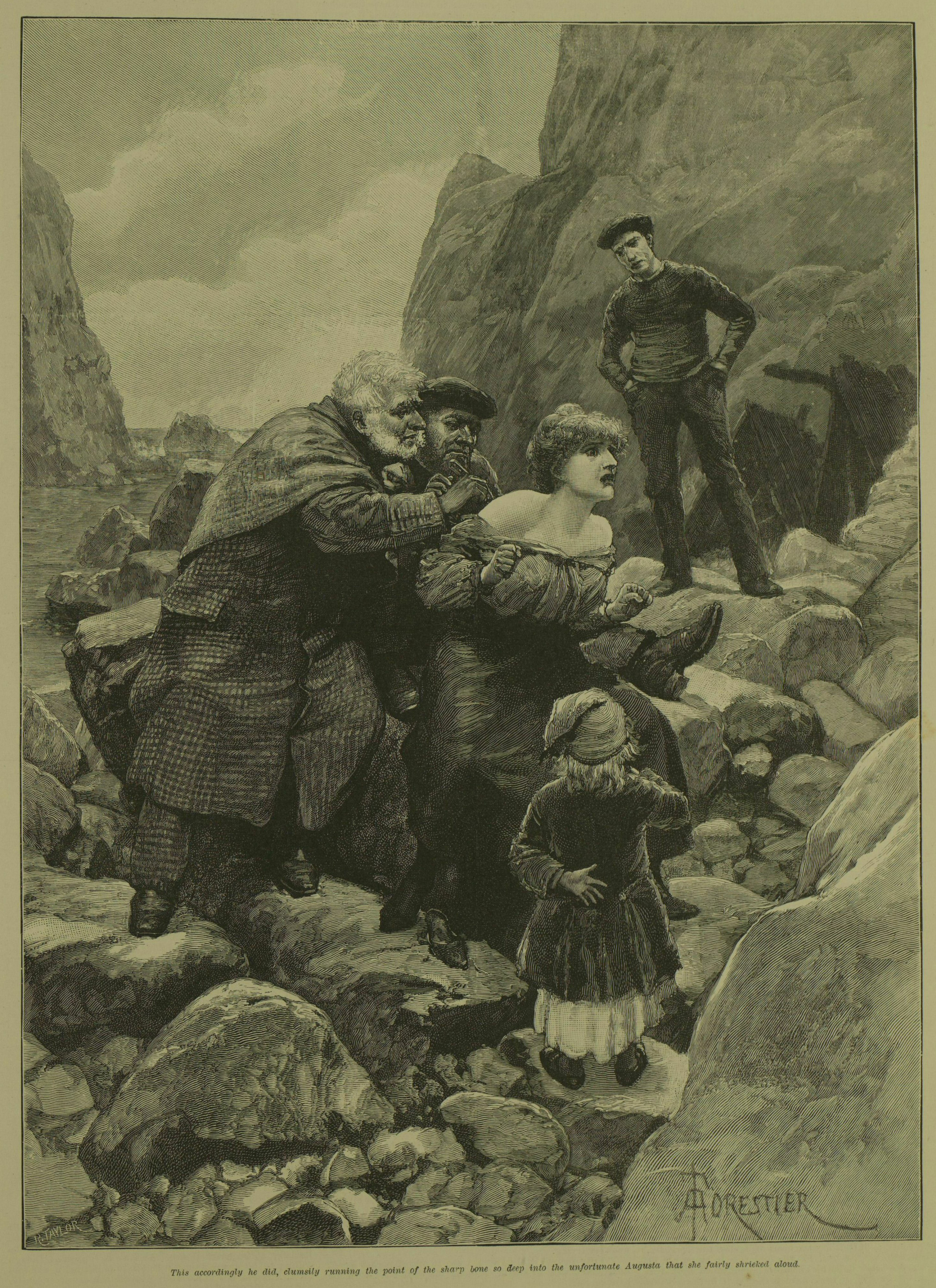
Illustration by A Forestier, from "Mr. Meeson's Will", published in the June 1888 edition of The Illustrated London News.

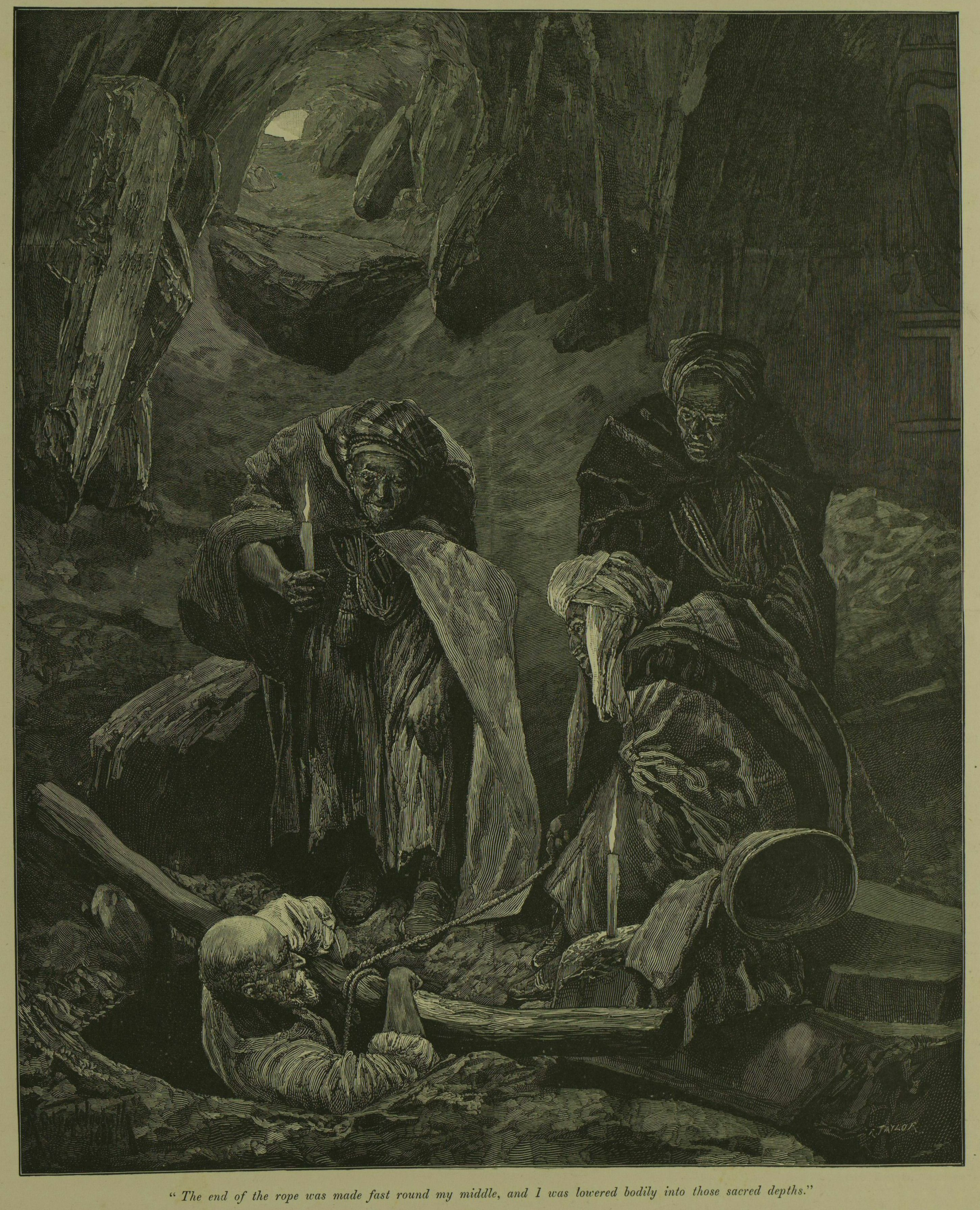
Illustration by Richard Caton Woodville, Jr., of a Haggard novel, Cleopatra, serialised in The Illustrated London News

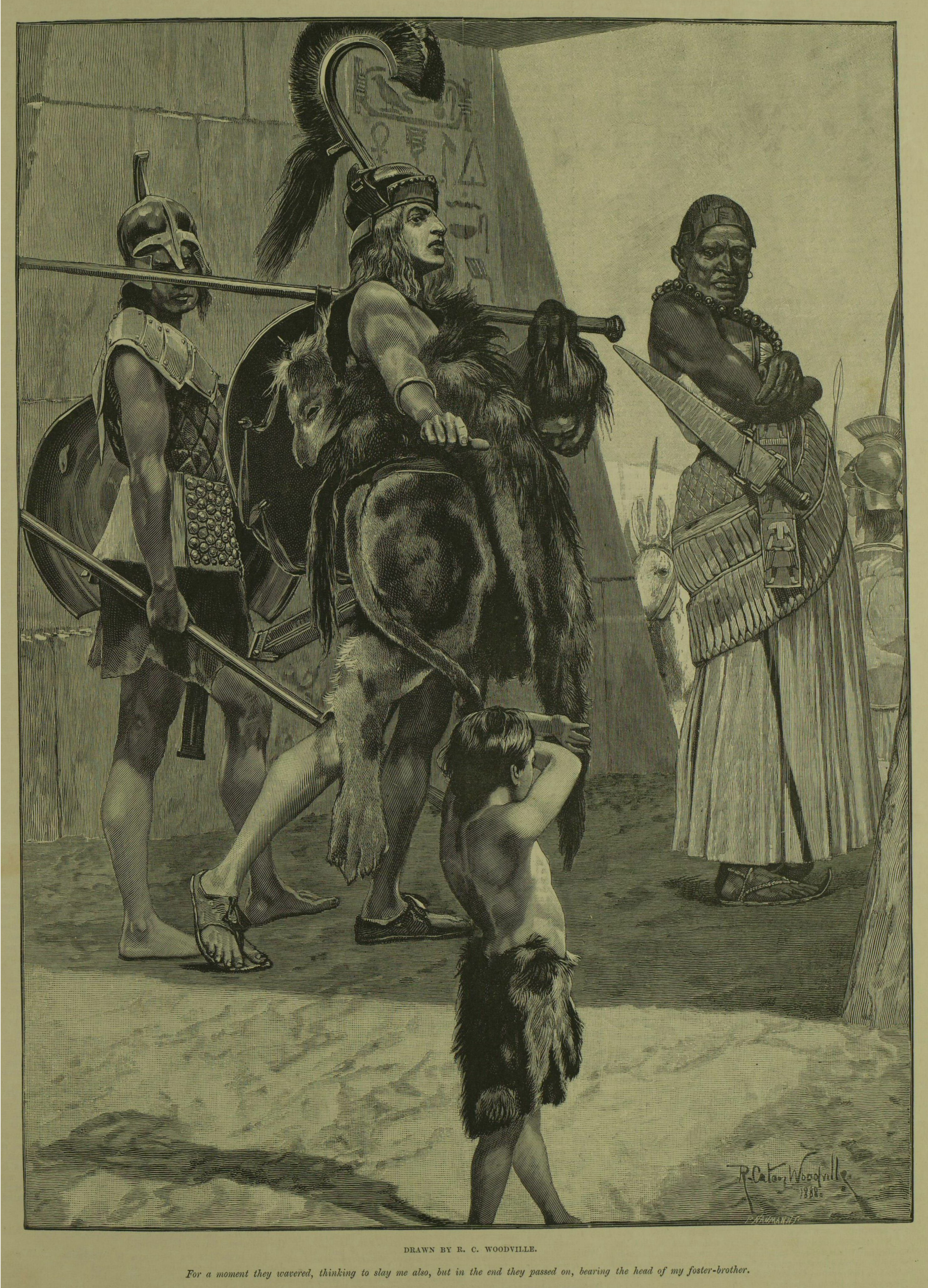
Illustration by Richard Caton Woodville, Jr., of a Haggard novel, Cleopatra, serialised in The Illustrated London News

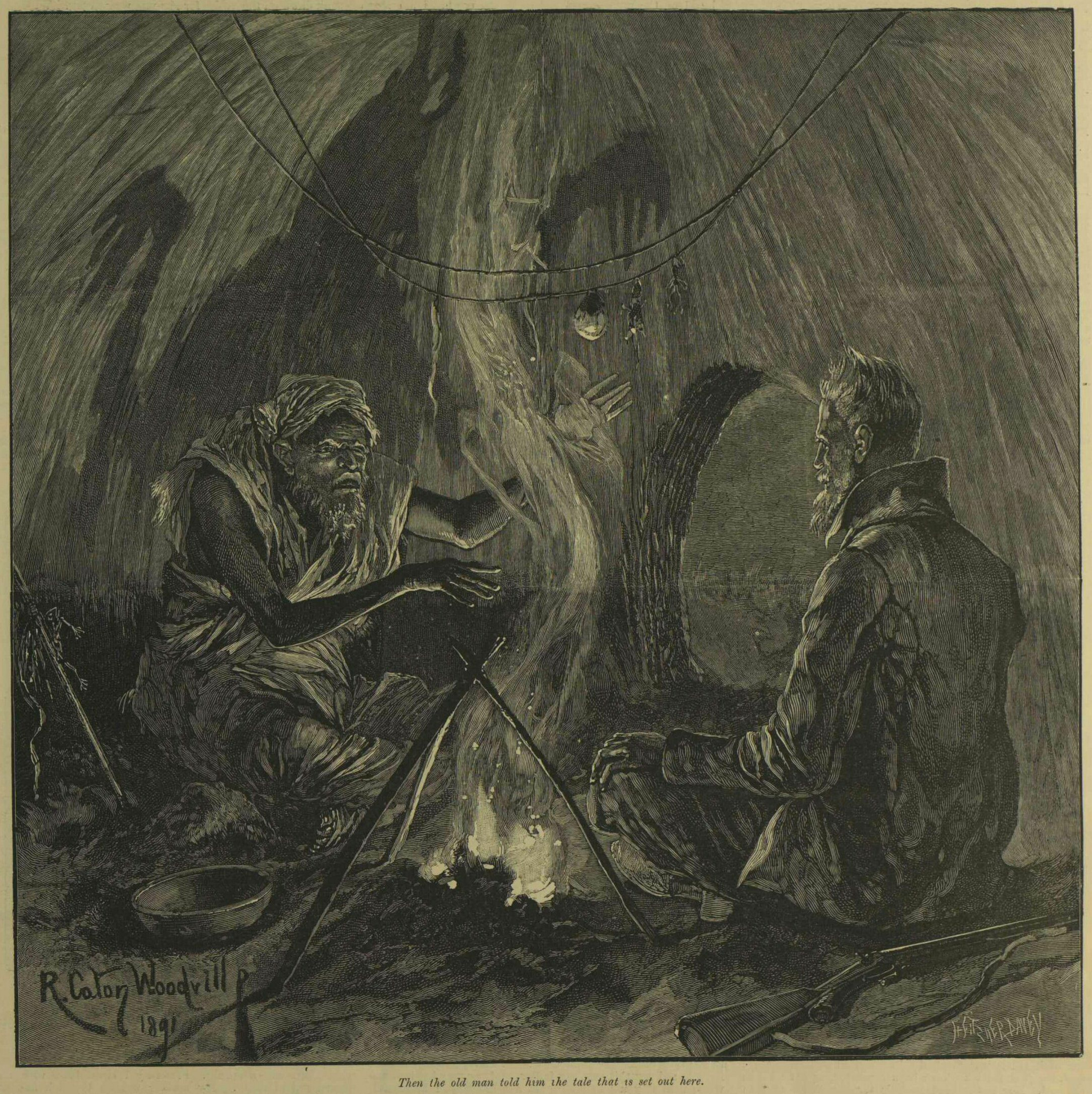
Illustration by Richard Caton Woodville, Jr., of a Haggard novel, Nada the Lily, serialised in The Illustrated London News

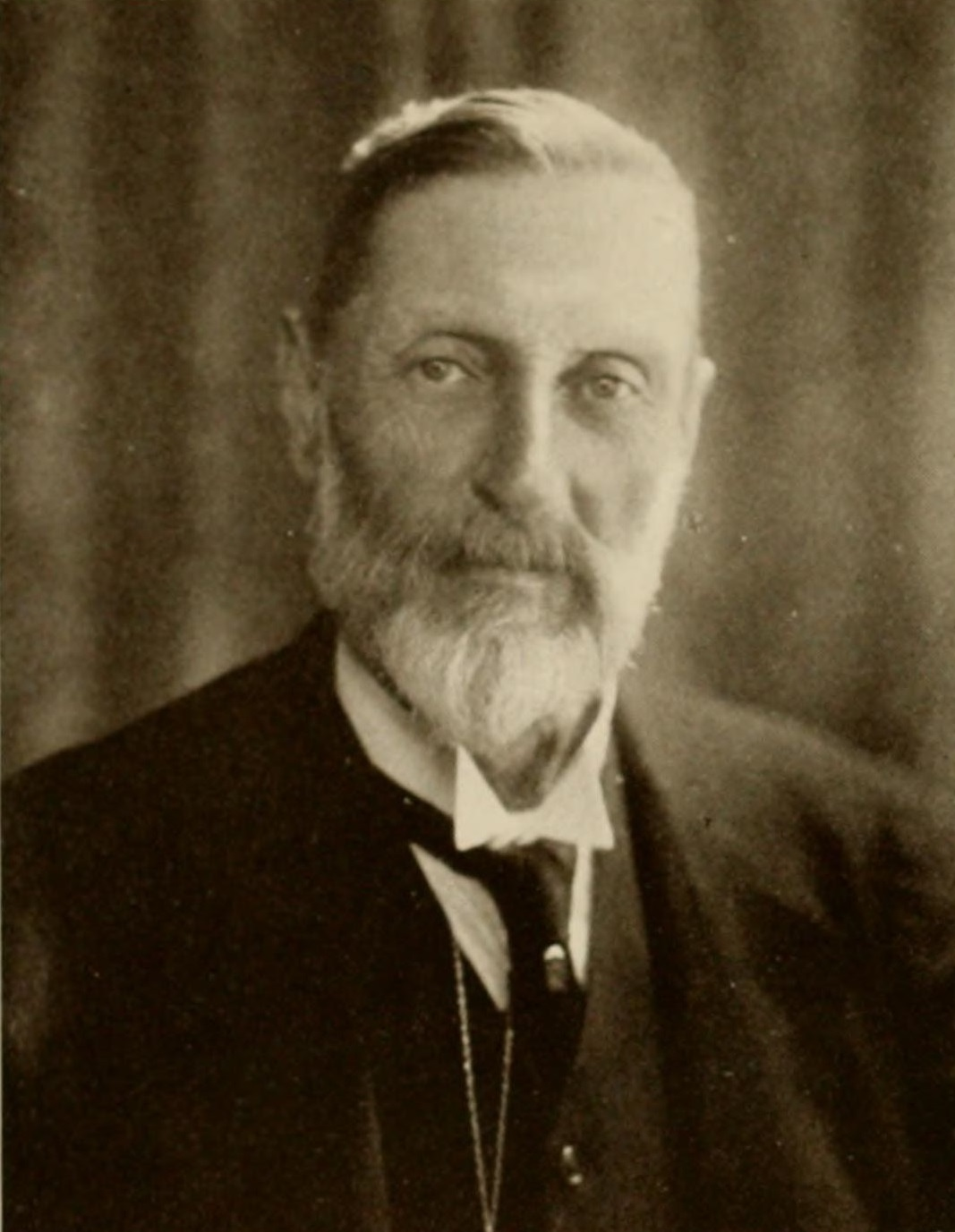
Rider Haggard, later in life

Rider Haggard's work in periodicals and newspapers (initially sorted by publication date)
Title	Date of publication	Periodical
"The Transvaal"	May 1877	Macmillan's Magazine
"A Zulu War-Dance"	July 1877	The Gentleman's Magazine
"A Visit to the Chief Secocoeni"	September 1877	The Gentleman's Magazine
"Hydrophobia" (letter)	3 November 1885	The Times
"The Land Question" (letter)	28 April 1886	The Times
"About Fiction"	February 1887	The Contemporary Review
"Mr Rider Haggard and His Critics" (letter)	27 April 1887	The Times
"Our Position in Cyprus"	July 1887	The Contemporary Review
"American Copyright" (letter)	11 October 1887	The Times
"On Going Back"	November 1887	Longman's Magazine
"Delagoa Bay" (letter)	17 December 1887	The Times
"South African Policy" (letter)	27 December 1887	The Times
"Suggested Prologue to a Dramatised Version of She"	March 1888	Longman's Magazine
"Mr. Meeson's Will"	18 June 1888	The Illustrated London News
"The Wreck of the Copeland"	18 August 1888	The Illustrated London News
"Cleopatra"	3 December 1888	The Illustrated London News
"Hydrophobia and Muzzling" (letter)	25 October 1889	The Times
"The Annals of Natal"	23 November 1889	The Saturday Review
"Mummy at St Mary / Woolnoth's" (letter)	25 December 1889	The Times
"Mummies" (letter)	27 December 1889	The Times
"The Fate of Swaziland"	January 1890	The New Review
"In Memoriam"	17 May 1890	Thompson's Seasons
"American Copyright" (letter)	5 June 1890	The Times
"Mr Herbert Ward and Mr Stanley"	10 November 1890	The Times
"Nada the Lily"	2 January 1892	The Illustrated London News
"A New Argument Against Creation"	19 December 1892	The Times
"My First Book. Dawn. By H. Rider Haggard"	April 1893	The Idler
"The Tale of Isandlwana and Rorke's Drift"	4 October 1893	The True Story Book
"Lobengula" (letter)	19 October 1893	The Times
"The New Sentiment" (letter)	6 November 1893	The Times
"Wanted—Imagination"	25 December 1893	The Times
"The Fate of Captain Patterson's Party"	28 December 1893	The Times
"The Three Volume Novel" (letter)	27 July 1894	The Times
"The Adventures of John Gladwyn Jebb" (letter)	30 October 1894	The Times
"Agriculture in Norfolk" (letter)	30 October 1894	The Times
"The Nelson Bazaar" (letter)	16 February 1895	The Times
"Everything is Peaceful" (letter)	20 March 1895	The Times
"Lord Kimberley in Norfolk" (letter)	17 April 1895	The Times
"The East Norfolk Election" (letter)	23 July 1895	The Times
"The East Norfolk Election" (letter)	29 July 1895	The Times
"Wilson's Last Fight"	7 October 1895	The True Story Book
"The Crisis in the Transvaal" (letter)	2 January 1896	The Times
"The Transvaal Crisis" (letter)	13 January 1896	The Times
"Jameson's Surrender" (letter)	14 March 1896	The Times
"The Rinderpest in South Africa" (letter)	5 November 1896	The Times
"Mr Rider Haggard and Dr Neufeld" (letter)	9 January 1899	The Times
"Shrinkage of Population in Agricultural Districts" (letter)	9 May 1899	The Times
"The South African Crisis—An Appeal" (letter)	1 July 1899	The Times
"Commandant-General Joubert and Mr H Rider Haggard" (letter)	8 September 1899	The Times
"Anglo-African Writers' Club"	17 October 1899	The Times
"The War" (letter)	25 October 1899	The Times
"Farming in 1899" (letter)	22 December 1899	The Times
"Farming in 1899" (letter)	1 January 1900	The Times
"Settlement of Soldiers in South Africa" (letter)	5 May 1900	The Times
"1881 and 1900" (letter)	2 October 1900	The Times
"An Incident of African History by H Rider Haggard"	December 1900	The Windsor Magazine
"Farming in 1900" (letter)	1 January 1901	The Times
"Central and Associated Chambers of Agriculture" (letter)	6 November 1901	The Times
"Small Holdings" (letter)	8 November 1901	The Times
"Rural England" (letter)	4 February 1903	The Times
"Mr Rider Haggard on Rural Depopulation"	3 May 1903	The Times
"Agricultural Distress" (letter)	11 June 1903	The Times
"The Motor Problem" (letter)	24 June 1903	The Times
"Fiscal Policy and Agriculture" (letter)	16 December 1903	The Times
"Telepathy (?) Between a Human Being and a Dog" (letter)	21 July 1904	The Times
"Telepathy (?) Between a Human Being and a Dog" (letter)	9 August 1904	The Times
"Mr Rider Haggard on Small Holdings"	12 September 1904	The Times
"Case L.1139 Dream"	October 1904	Journal of the Society for Psychical Research
"Mr Rider Haggard on Agriculture"	22 October 1904	The Times
"Mr Rider Haggard on Rural Housing"	27 October 1904	The Times
"The Deserted Village" (letter)	25 August 1905	The Times
"Decrease of Population and the Land" (letter)	6 January 1906	The Times
"Prevention of Cruelty to Children"	3 February 1906	The Times
"The New Land and Tenure Bill" (letter)	12 March 1906	The Times
"Garden City Association"	17 March 1906	The Times
"Mr H. Rider Haggard on the Zulus"	19 May 1906	The Illustrated London News
"To Be Proof against British Bullets: A Zulu Incantation"	19 May 1906	The Illustrated London News
"Housing of the Working Classes"	26 June 1906	The Times
"Mr Rider Haggard on Small Holdings"	4 July 1906	The Times
"The Unemployed and Waste City Lands" (letter)	19 July 1906	The Times
"Mr Rider Haggard on the Transvaal Constitution"	7 August 1906	The Times
"Vanishing East Anglia"	1 September 1906	The Saturday Review
"The Landgrabbing at Plaistow"	5 September 1906	The Times
"The Land Tenure Bill"	22 November 1906	The Times
"Publishers and the Public" (letter)	19 February 1907	The Times
"The Careless Children"	2 March 1907	The Saturday Review
"The Government and the Land" (letter)	29 April 1907	The Times
"Chambers of Agriculture"	2 May 1907	The Times
"The Government and the Land" (letter)	8 May 1907	The Times
"Miss Jebb on Small Holdings"	15 June 1907	Country Life
"Rural Housing and Sanitation Association"	27 June 1907	The Times
"St Thomas Hospital Medical School"	28 June 1907	The Times
"The Land Question"	4 July 1907	The Times
"A Plea for the Sitting Tennant" (letter)	12 August 1907	The Times
"A Literary Coincidence" (letter)	19 October 1907	The Spectator
"Town Planning Conference"	26 October 1907	The Times
"Dr Barnardo's Homes"	16 November 1907	The Times
"The Proposed Agricultural Party"	5 December 1907	The Times
"Mr Rider Haggard and Small Holdings"	10 January 1908	The Times
"Mr Haggard and Children's Legislation"	13 March 1908	The Times
"The Drink Trade and Common Sense" (letter)	2 April 1908	The Times
"The Zulus: the Finest Savage Race in the World"	June 1908	The Pall Mall Magazine
"Sparrows" (letter)	18 August 1908	The Times
"Sparrows, Rats and Humanity" (letter)	5 September 1908	The Times
"The Letters of Queen Victoria" (letter)	26 November 1908	The Times
"The Romance of the World's Greatest Rivers"	December 1908	Travel Magazine
"Afforestation. Mr Rider Haggard's View"	1 March 1909	The Times
"The Late Sir Marshal Clarke" (letter)	13 April 1909	The Times
"Mr Rider Haggard on Agriculture"	27 November 1909	The Times
"Mr Rider Haggard on South Africa "	11 March 1910	The Times
"Why?" (letter)	25 April 1910	The Times
"Mr Rider Haggard on Irish Agriculture"	23 May 1910	The Times
"Why Not?" (letter)	12 July 1910	The Times
"Mr Rider Haggard on Agriculture"	16 September 1910	The Times
"Mr Rider Haggard on Vermin"	8 November 1910	The Times
"Danish High Schools"	21 December 1910	The Times
"Sugar Beet Growing in Norfolk"	6 March 1911	The Times
"Rural Denmark" (letter)	22 March 1911	The Times
"Rural Denmark" (letter)	3 April 1911	The Times
"The Copyright Bill" (letter)	6 June 1911	The Times
"Mr Rider Haggard on Poverty. The Burden of Civilization"	15 July 1911	The Times
"Mr Rider Haggard and the Public Records"	28 July 1911	The Times
"The Farmers' Burden"	1 December 1911	The Times
"Egyptian Date Farm. The Financial Aspect"	11 October 1912	The Times
"Umslopogaas and Makokel. Sir H. Rider Haggard on Zulu Types" (letter)	16 August 1913	The Times
"The Death of Mark Haggard" (letter)	10 October 1914	The Times
"On the Land. Old Problems and New Ways. The War—and After."	15 March 1915	The Times
"Soldiers as Settlers. After-War Problem for the Empire"	20 August 1915	The Times
"Raids by Air. Zeppelins and Zeppelins" (letter)	22 October 1915	The Times
"Women's Work on the Land. A Palliative in Hard Times" (letter)	29 November 1915	The Times
"Women on the Land. Town Girls' Unfitness for Farm Work" (letter)	9 December 1915	The Times
"Soldiers as Settlers. Sir Rider Haggard's Oversea Mission"	2 February 1916	The Times
"Soldiers as Settlers" (letter)	7 February 1916	The Times
"Soldier Settlers. The Future of Rural England. Sir Rider Haggard's Mission" (letter)	10 February 1916	The Times
"Farewell Luncheon to Sir Rider Haggard"	March 1916	United Empire
"Soldier Settlers for the Empire. Offer from Victoria"	18 April 1916	The Times
"Sir R Haggard's Tour. Land for Ex-Service Men"	22 July 1916	The Times
"Sir H. Rider Haggard's Mission. Land for Ex-Soldiers"	1 August 1916	The Times
"Land for Ex-Soldiers. Outline of Sir R. Haggard's Report"	12 August 1916	The Times
"Empire Land Settlement Deputation to the Secretary of State for the Colonies and the President of the Board of Agriculture"	September 1916	United Empire
"Empire Land Settlement by Sir Rider Haggard"	December 1916	United Empire
"A Journey through Zululand by Sir H Rider Haggard"	December 1916	The Windsor Magazine
"Mr Wilson's Note. British Publicity"	28 December 1916	The Times
"Home Produce" (letter)	22 February 1917	The Times
"The Milk Supply" (letter)	11 April 1917	The Times
"Corn Production Bill. A National Measure" (letter)	13 June 1917	The Times
"A Protest and a Plea. Farmers and Meat" (letter)	9 October 1917	The Times
"Pig-Breeding. A Subject for Municipal Enterprise" (letter)	22 February 1918	The Times
"The German Colonies. Interests of the Dominions" (letter)	5 November 1918	The Times
"Light—More Light!" (letter)	19 November 1918	The Times
"A Great American. Tributes to the Late Mr Roosevelt" (letter)	8 January 1919	The Times
"Shut the Door" (letter)	10 March 1919	The Times
"Population and Housing. Emigration v Birth Control"	25 March 1919	The Times
"The Ex-Kaiser" (letter)	11 April 1919	The Times
"Empire Birth-Rate. Sir Rider Haggard on Emigration"	17 April 1919	The Times
"Ex-Service Men Abroad. Warnings from California" (letter)	10 May 1919	The Times
"Edith Cavell" (letter)	16 May 1919	The Times
"The Ex-Kaiser. Uncertainties of Trial" (letter)	8 July 1919	The Times
"Race Suicide Peril. Western Civilization Threatened"	11 October 1919	The Times
"The British Cinema. Production of Reputable Films" (letter)	5 November 1919	The Times
"Horrors on the Film. Limits of Publicity" (letter)	19 November 1919	The Times
"The Hill of Death by Sir H Rider Haggard"	December 1919	The Windsor Magazine
"The British Museum" (letter)	24 January 1920	The Times
"Air Exploration and Empire" (letter)	7 February 1920	The Times
"The Liberty League. A Campaign Against Bolshevism" (letter)	3 March 1920	The Times
"Bolshevist Peril. Counter-Propaganda"	4 March 1920	The Times
"The Empire's Vacant Lands. Settlers and the Food Supply"	14 April 1920	The Times
"Films and Happy Endings. The Tyranny of a Convention" (letter)	21 April 1921	The Times
"Land and its Burdens. Evil of Grinding Taxation" (letter)	8 August 1921	The Times
"Boy Emigrants" (letter)	31 March 1922	The Times
"Migration and Morals. Declining Birther Rate"	7 April 1922	The Times
"Labour Party's Programme. Confiscation and Class Hatred" (letter)	28 October 1922	The Times
"Efficient Denmark. Keeping the People on the Land"	7 December 1922	The Times
"The Egyptian Find. Tombs of Eighteenth Dynasty Queens" (letter)	19 December 1922	The Times
"King Tutankhamen. Reburial in Great Pyramid" (letter)	13 February 1923	The Times
"The Norfolk Dispute. A Truce while There is Time" (letter)	3 April 1923	The Times
"Rural Post and Telephone. Minister's Reply to Deputation"	19 April 1923	The Times
"Liberalism and Land Reform" (letter)	1 May 1923	The Times
"Small Holdings. Influence of Heredity" (letter)	4 July 1923	The Times
"Agricultural Parcel Post"	26 July 1923	The Times
"Country Houses for Sale. Empty East Anglian Mansions" (letter)	14 June 1924	The Times
"Plight of Agriculture"	24 July 1924	The Times
"Loans From British Museum" (letter)	30 July 1924	The Times
"Zinovieff Letter. Mr MacDonald and a "Political Plot". A Matter of Honour" (letter)	29 October 1924	The Times
"Two Centuries of Publishing. Tributes to Messrs. Longmans"	6 November 1924	The Times
"Imagination and War"	26 November 1924	The Times

== Non-fiction ==
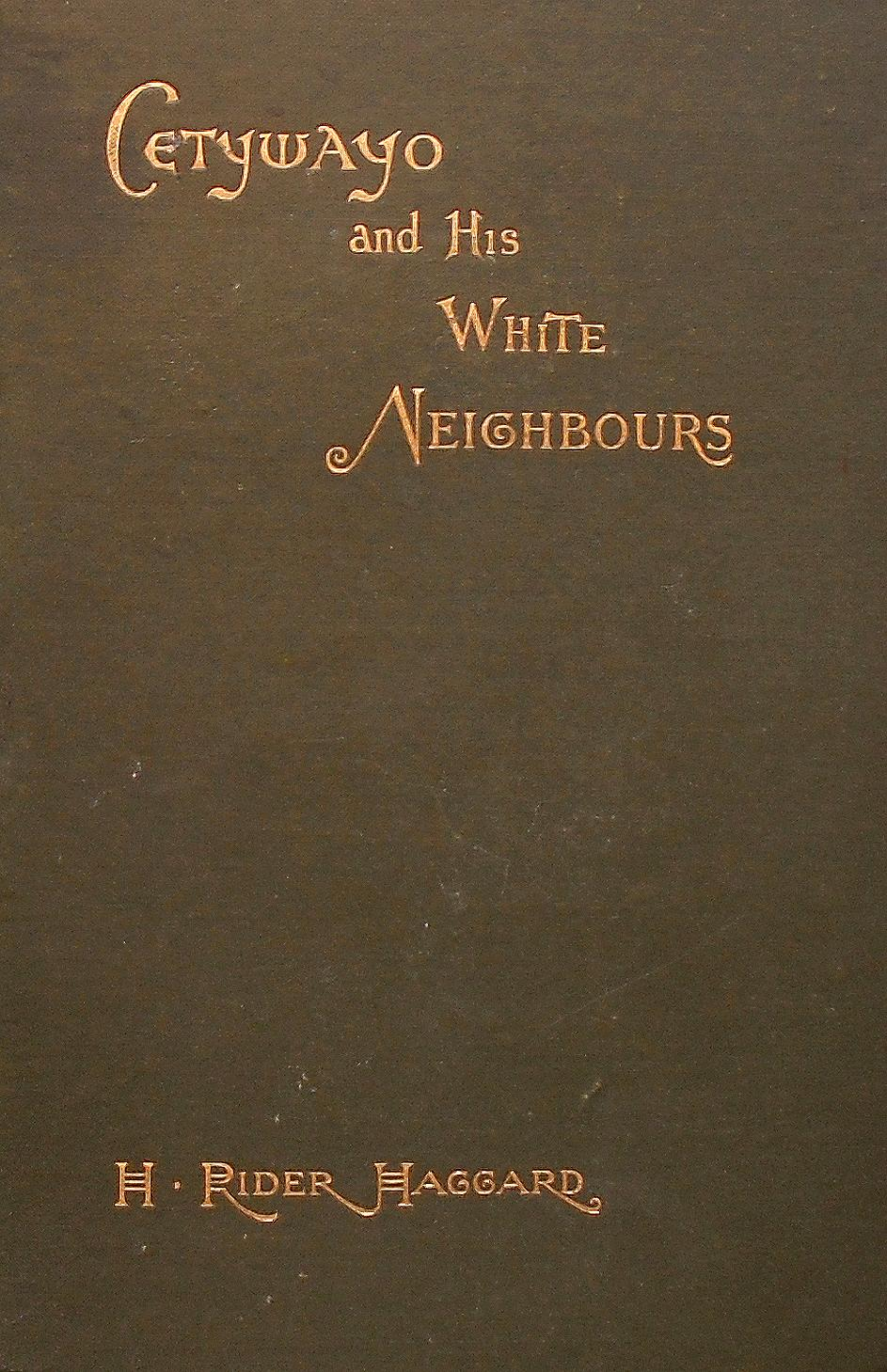
Cover of Cetywayo and His White Neighbours (1888)

Non-fiction by Rider Haggard (initially sorted by publication year)
Title	Year of first publication	First edition publisher (London, unless otherwise stated)	Ref.
Cetywayo and His White Neighbours	1882 (Note: Enlarged edition published in 1888.)	Trübner & Co	
An Heroic Effort	1893	Frome: Butler & Tanner	
A Farmer's Year	1899	Longmans Green	
The Last Boer War (American title: A History of the Transvaal)	1899	Kegan Paul, Trench, Trübner	
A Winter Pilgrimage	1901	Longmans Green	
Rural England	1902	Longmans Green	
A Gardener's Year	1905	Longmans Green	
The Poor and the Land	1905	Longmans Green	
Regeneration	1910	Longmans Green	
Rural Denmark	1911	Longmans Green	
The Days of My Life (Note: In two volumes.)	1926	Longmans Green	

== Novels ==
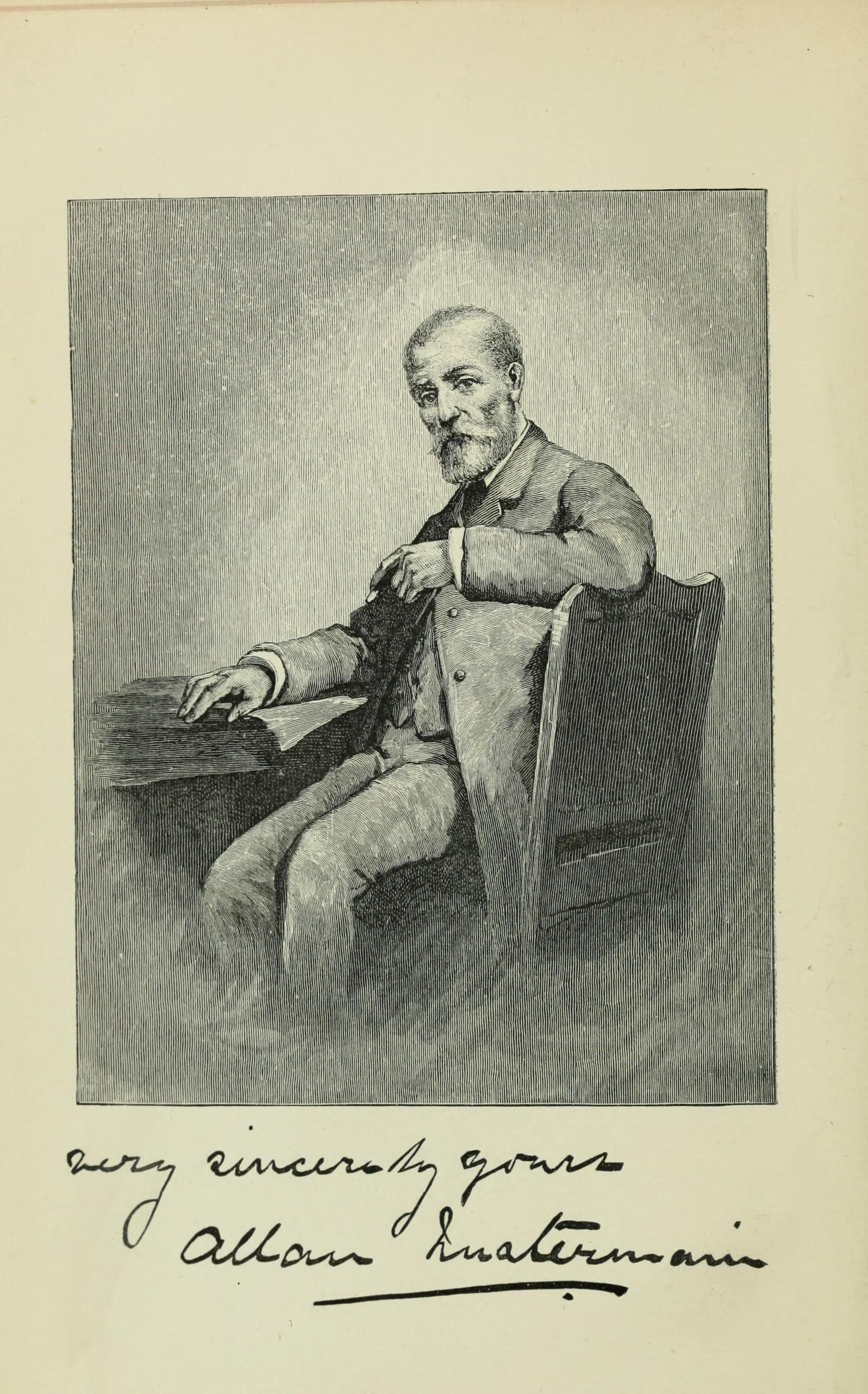
Allan Quatermain, shown in the frontispiece of the 1887 novel of the same name.

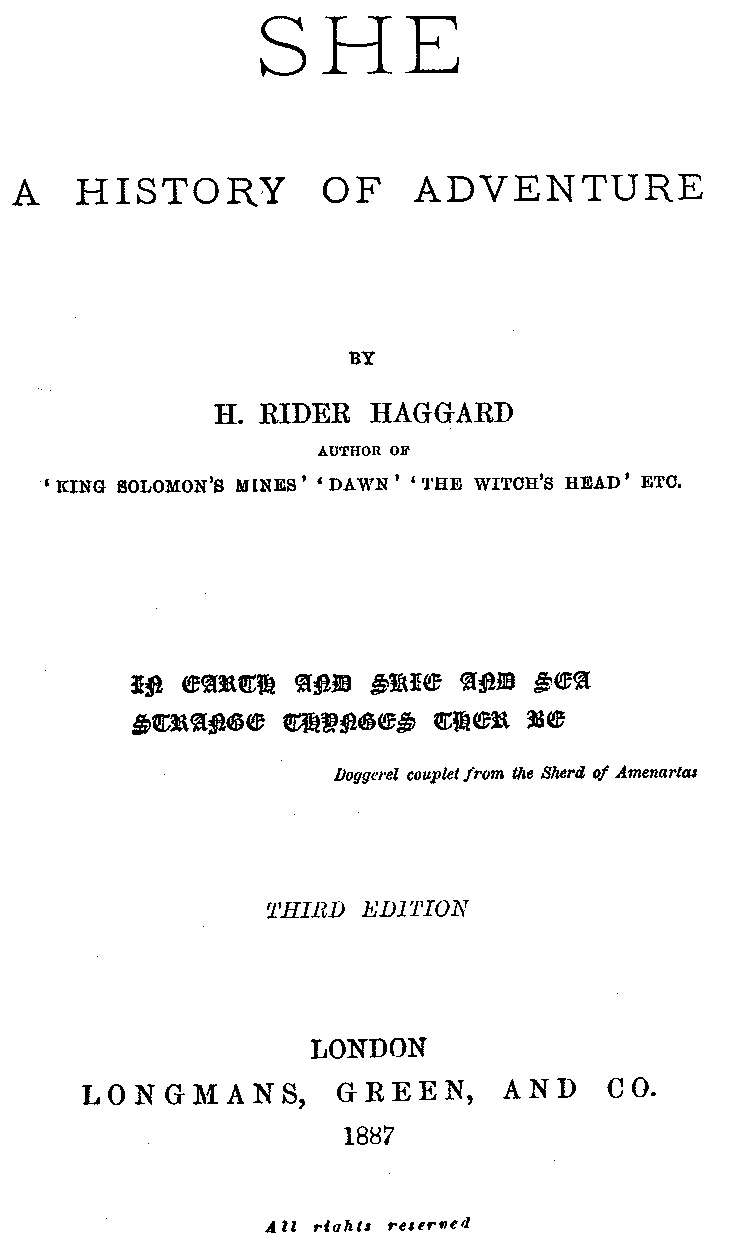
Frontispiece of She: A History of Adventure (1887)

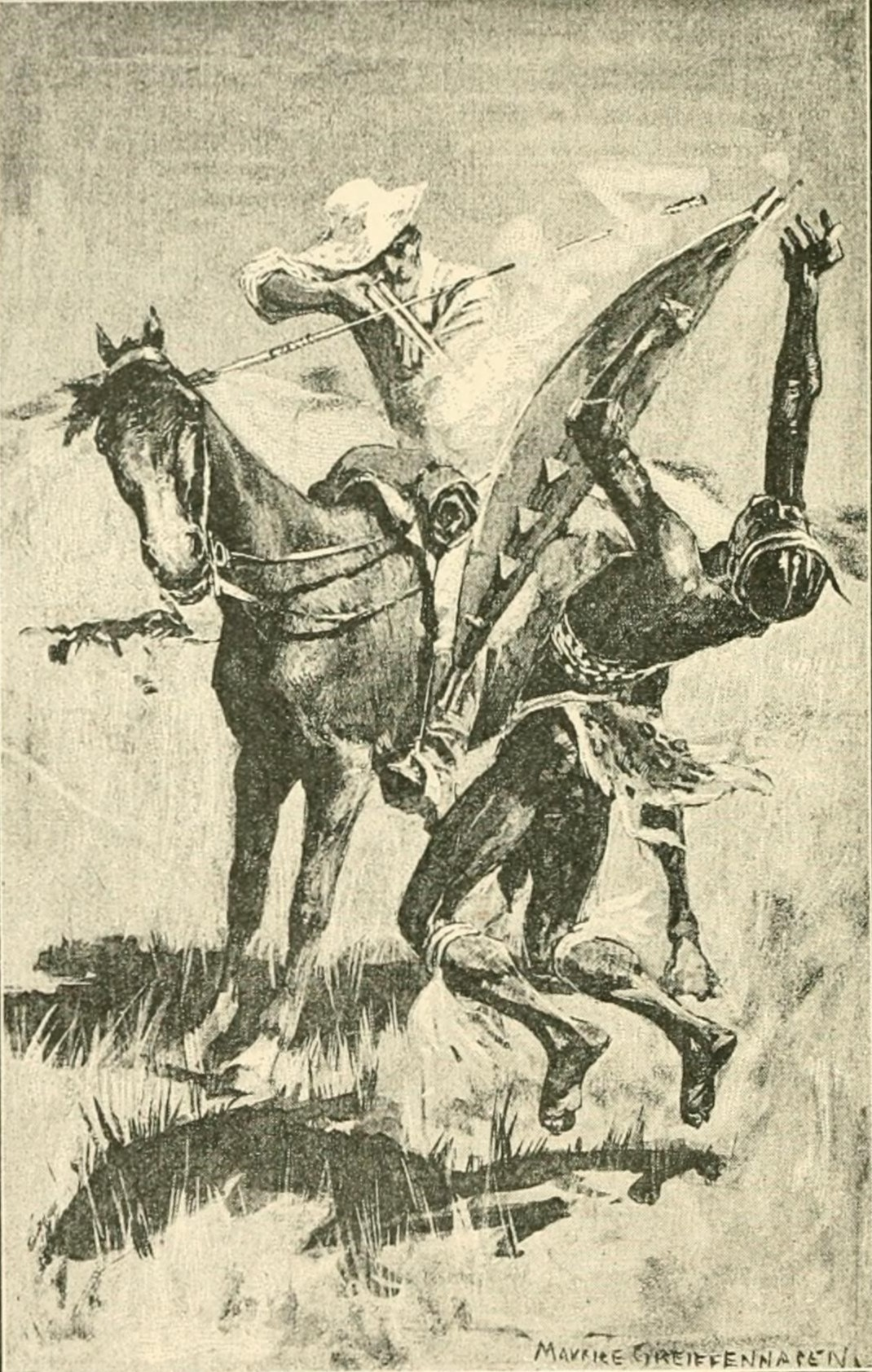
Illustration of Allan Quatermain by Maurice Greiffenhagen in Allan's Wife and Other Tales

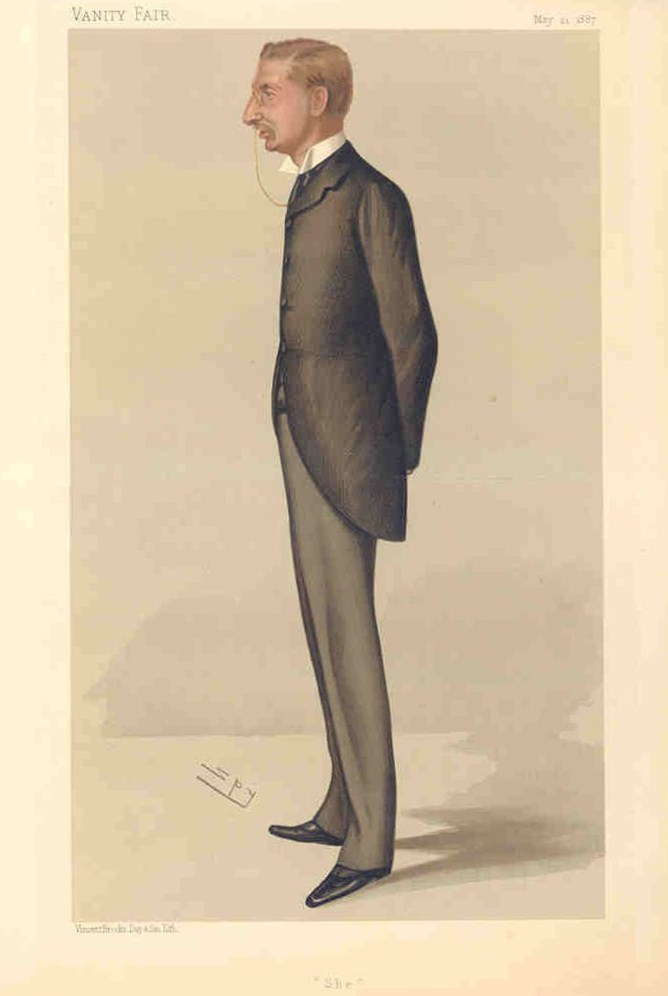
Caricature of Rider Haggard in Vanity Fair, 1887

Novels of Rider Haggard (initially sorted by publication year)
Title	Year of first publication	First edition publisher (London, unless otherwise stated)	Notes	Ref.
Dawn	1884	Hurst and Blackett	Published in three volumes	
The Witch's Head	1884	Hurst and Blackett	Published in three volumes	
King Solomon's Mines	1885	Cassell	Allan Quatermain series	
She: A History of Adventure	1886	New York: Harper	Ayesha series	
Allan Quatermain	1887	Longmans, Green & Co.	Allan Quatermain series	
Jess	1887	Smith, Elder & Co.		
A Tale of Three Lions	1887	New York: Lovell	Allan Quatermain series	
Maiwa's Revenge, or the War of the Little Hand	1888	Longmans Green	Allan Quatermain series	
Colonel Quaritch, VC	1889	Longmans Green	Published in three volumes	
Cleopatra	1889	Longmans Green		
Beatrice	1890	Longmans Green		
The World's Desire	1890	Longmans Green	Co-written with Andrew Lang	
Eric Brighteyes	1891	Longmans Green		
Nada the Lily	1892	Longmans Green	Allan Quatermain and Ayesha series	
Montezuma's Daughter	1893	Longmans Green		
The People of the Mist	1894	Longmans Green		
Heart of the World	1895	Longmans Green		
Joan Haste	1895	Longmans Green		
The Wizard	1896	Bristol: J. W. Arrowsmith		
Doctor Therne	1898	Longmans Green		
Swallow: A Tale of the Great Trek	1899	Longmans Green		
Lysbeth	1901	Longmans Green		
Pearl Maiden	1903	Longmans Green		
Stella Fregelius: A Tale of Three Destinies	1903	Longmans Green		
The Brethren	1904	Cassell		
Ayesha: The Return of She	1905	Ward Lock & Co	Ayesha series. Serialised in The Windsor Magazine December 1904 – October 1905	
The Way of the Spirit	1906	Hutchinson		
Benita	1906	Cassell		
Fair Margaret	1907	Hutchinson		
The Ghost Kings	1908	Cassell		
The Yellow God	1908	New York: Cupples & Leon		
The Lady of Blossholme	1909	Hodder & Stoughton		
Morning Star	1910	Cassell		
Queen Sheba's Ring	1910	Nash		
Red Eve	1911	Hodder & Stoughton		
The Mahatma and the Hare	1911	Longmans Green		
Marie	1912	Cassell	Allan Quatermain series	
Child of Storm	1913	Cassell	Allan Quatermain series	
The Wanderer's Necklace	1914	Cassell		
The Holy Flower	1915	Ward Lock & Co	Allan Quatermain series. Serialised in The Windsor Magazine December 1913 - November 1914	
The Ivory Child	1916	Cassell	Allan Quatermain series	
Finished	1917	Ward Lock & Co	Allan Quatermain series	
Love Eternal	1918	Cassell		
Moon of Israel	1918	John Murray		
When the World Shook	1919	Cassell		
The Ancient Allan	1920	Cassell	Allan Quatermain series	
She and Allan	1921	Hutchinson	Allan Quatermain series and Ayesha series	
The Virgin of the Sun	1922	Cassell		
Wisdom's Daughter	1923	Hutchinson	Ayesha series	
Heu-Heu	1924	Hutchinson	Allan Quatermain series	
Queen of the Dawn	1925	Hutchinson		
The Treasure of the Lake	1926	Hutchinson	Allan Quatermain series	
Allan and the Ice-gods	1927	Hutchinson	Allan Quatermain series	
Mary of Marion Isle	1929	Hutchinson		
Belshazzar	1930	Stanley Paul		

== Short story collections ==
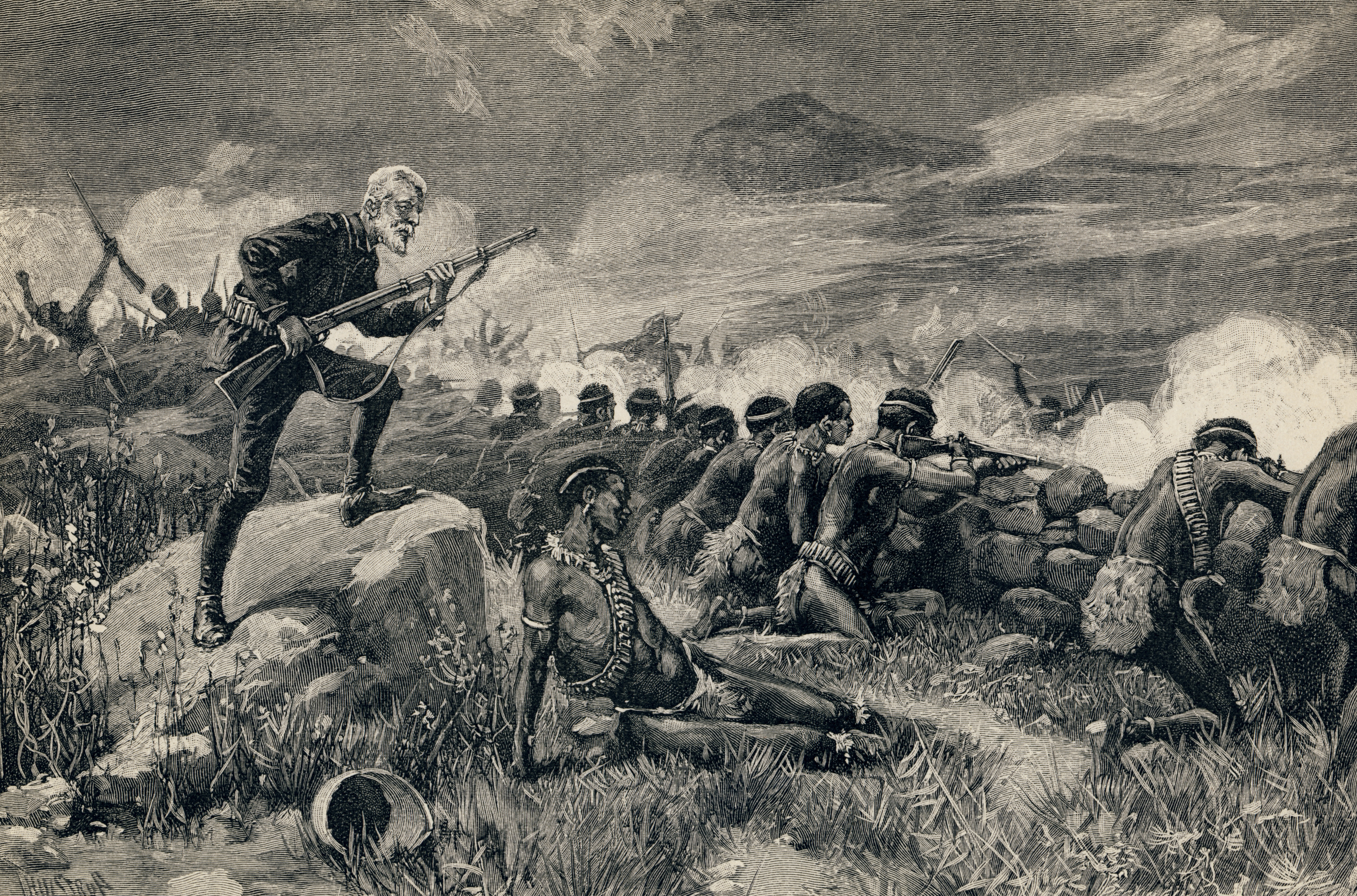
Allan Quatermain orders his men to fire in this illustration by Thure de Thulstrup from Maiwa's Revenge (1888).

Short story collections by Rider Haggard (initially sorted by publication year)
Title	Year of first publication	First edition publisher (London, unless otherwise stated)	Ref.
Allan's Wife and Other Tales	1889	Hurst and Blackett	
Black Heart and White Heart: A Zulu Idyll (Note: Republished in part as Elissa: The Doom of Zimbabwe, London: Longmans, 1900.)	1900	Longmans Green	
Smith and the Pharaohs	1920	Kent: Simkin, Marshall, Hamilton	

== Notes and references ==
=== Sources ===
- Allen, Roger (June 1984). "Rider Haggard". The Book and Magazine Collector (4). Diamond Publishing Group.
- Brantlinger, Patrick (2006). Scott Kastan, David (ed.). The Oxford Encyclopedia of British Literature. Oxford: Oxford University Press. ISBN 978-0-1953-0744-3. (subscription required)
- Carpenter, Richard C. (1988). "H. Rider Haggard". In Benstock, Bernard; Staley, Thomas (eds.). British Mystery Writers, 1860–1919. Detroit: Gale Research. ISBN 978-0-8103-1748-2.
- Cohen, Morton N. (2004). "Haggard, Sir (Henry) Rider". Oxford Dictionary of National Biography (online ed.). Oxford University Press. doi:10.1093/ref:odnb/33632. (Subscription, Wikipedia Library access or UK public library membership required.)
- McKay, Richard C. (1930). A Bibliography of Sir Rider Haggard. London: The Bookman's Journal. OCLC 3744722.
- Pocock, Tom (1993). Rider Haggard and the Lost Empire. London: Weidenfeld and Nicolson. ISBN 978-0-297-81308-8.
