= Minuscule 703 =

- New Testament manuscript
- Text: Gospels
- Date: 11th century
- Script: Greek
- Now at: San Marino, California
- Size: 21.5 cm by 16.5 cm
- Type: Byzantine text-type/mixed
- Category: none

Minuscule 703 (in the Gregory-Aland numbering), is a Greek minuscule manuscript of the New Testament, on parchment. Palaeographically it has been assigned to the 11th century. The manuscript has complex contents. Scrivener labelled it by 885^{e}.

== Description ==
The codex contains the text of the four Gospels on two volumes, 199 + 210 parchment leaves (size 21.5 cm by 16.5 cm).

The text is written in one columns per page, 18 lines per page.

The text is divided according to the κεφαλαια (chapters), which numbers are given at the margin; the τιτλοι (titles) are given at the top. There is also a division according to the Ammonian Sections (in Mark 234, 16:9), with a references to the Eusebian Canons.

It contains the Epistula ad Carpianum, Eusebian tables, Prolegomena, the tables of the κεφαλαια (tables of contents) before each Gospel, lectionary markings at the margin, incipits, Synaxarion, Menologion, and pictures.

== Text ==
Kurt Aland the Greek text of the codex did not place in any Category.

According to the Claremont Profile Method it represents mixed Byzantine text, related to the textual family K^{x} in Luke 1, Luke 10, and Luke 20.

It lacks the Pericope Adulterae (John 7:53-8:11).

== History ==
According to the colophon the manuscript was written in 1251.

Currently the manuscript is dated by the INTF to the 11th century.

It was added to the list of New Testament manuscript by Scrivener (885) and Gregory (703). Gregory saw the manuscript in 1883.

Formerly it was housed in London, in Quaritch (1251). In 1900 Gregory stated that the place of housing of the manuscript is unknown. In 1915 the manuscript was found in United States.

The manuscript is now housed at the Huntington Library (HM 1081) in San Marino, California.

== See also ==
- List of New Testament minuscules
- Biblical manuscript
- Textual criticism
- Minuscule 2284
