= Eternal Love =

Eternal Love may refer to:

== Songs ==
- "Eternal Love" (PJ & Duncan song), 1994
- "Eternal Love" (Fin.K.L song), 1999
- "Eternal Love", a 2021 song by JLS
- "Eternal Love" by Whitney Houston from Paul Jabara & Friends
- "Eternal Love" by Stephanie Mills from Merciless
- "Kärleken är" ("Love is", English title: "Eternal Love"), a Swedish-language song by Jill Johnson

== Films ==
- Eternal Love (1917 film), silent film directed by Douglas Gerrard
- Eternal Love (1929 film), silent film directed by Ernst Lubitsch starring John Barrymore
- The Love Eterne, 1963 Hong Kong film

== TV shows ==
- Eternal Love (Persian TV series), a Persian-language reality show
- Eternal Love (Chinese TV series), a 2017 Chinese television series produced by Dragon TV based on the novel To the Sky Kingdom by Tang Qi
- The Eternal Love, a 2017 Chinese television series produced by Tencent Video based on the novel Bao Xiao Chong Fei: Ye Wo Deng Ni Xiu Qi by Fan Que

== See also ==
- Eternal Lover (disambiguation)
- Love Eternal (disambiguation)
