= Quaritch =

Quaritch is a surname. Notable people with the name include:

- Bernard Quaritch (1819–1899), German-born British bookseller and bibliographer
- Bernard Alfred Quaritch (1870–1913), British bookseller and collector
- Horace Geoffrey Quaritch Wales (1900–1981), English historian

== Fictional characters ==
- Miles Quaritch, a character from James Cameron's Avatar franchise

== See also ==
- Colonel Quaritch, VC, an 1888 novel by H. Rider Haggard

Coronel Miles Quaritch
