= Love Eternal =

Love Eternal may refer to:

- "Love Eternal" (song), a single by Paul Haig
- Love Eternal (novel), a novel by H. Rider Haggard
- Love Eternal (film), a film directed by Brendan Muldowney
- L'Éternel retour, a French drama romance film, also known as Love Eternal
- "A Love Eternal", a song by Joe Satriani from the album Super Colossal

== See also ==
- Eternal Love (disambiguation)
