= Library of Adventures =

The Library of Adventures (Russian: Библиотека приключений, romanized: Biblioteka priklyuchenii) is a popular series of adventure novels published by Detgiz in the Soviet Union in 1955 and reprinted in 1981. The series, much sought after by Soviet book collectors, comprised twenty books, more or less accurately reflecting the tastes of an adolescent Russophone readership.

- Alexandre Dumas, père. The Three Musketeers.
- Arthur Conan Doyle. The Memoirs of Sherlock Holmes.
- Aleksei Tolstoy. The Garin Death Ray. Aelita.
- Anatoly Rybakov. The Dagger. The Bronze Bird.
- Vladimir Obruchev. Plutonia. Sannikov Land.
- Veniamin Kaverin. The Two Captains.
- Walter Scott. Quentin Durward.
- Rider Haggard. King Solomon's Mines. Fair Margaret.
- Gustave Aimard. Gambusino. Stronghand.
- Georgy Adamov. The Mystery of Two Oceans.
- Daniel Defoe. Robinson Crusoe.
- Jonathan Swift. Gulliver's Travels.
- Jules Verne. In Search of the Castaways.
- Ivan Efremov. The Land of Foam. The Starships.
- Louis Boussenard. The Diamond Raiders.
- Thomas Mayne Reid. Osceola.
- Mark Twain. Adventures of Tom Sawyer. Adventures of Huckleberry Finn.
- Robert Louis Stevenson. Treasure Island. The Black Arrow.
- Wilkie Collins. The Moonstone.
- James Fenimore Cooper. The Last of the Mohicans.
