= Eternal Lover =

Eternal Lover may refer to:

Music

- "Eternal Lover", a 2004 music single by CeCe Peniston
- "My Eternal Lover", a 1998 song by Indonesian extreme metal band Kekal

Literature

- Eternal Lover, a 2008 fantasy anthology by American writers Jackie Kessler, Richelle Mead and Hannah Howell
- Lover Eternal, a 2006 book of a paranormal romance Black Dagger Brotherhood series by American writer Jessica Bird
- The Eternal Lover, a 1925 fantasy-adventure novel by American writer Edgar Rice Burroughs
- A Hell of a Time, Eternal Lover, a 2008 dark paranormal book series by Kessler, see Hell on Earth

Others

- Papaver rhoeas, a herbaceous species of flowering plant in the poppy family, often referred to as "Eternal lover flower" in Persian literature.

== See also ==
- Eternal Love (disambiguation)
