= Minuscule 2284 =

- New Testament manuscript
- Text: Gospels
- Date: 13th century
- Script: Greek
- Now at: John Rylands University Library
- Size: 11.1 cm by 8.2 cm
- Type: Byzantine text-type
- Category: none

Minuscule 2284 (in the Gregory-Aland numbering), ε359 (von Soden), is a Greek minuscule manuscript of the New Testament, on parchment. Palaeographically it has been assigned to the 13th century. The manuscript has complex contents. Gregory labelled it by siglum 704. Scrivener labelled it by 886^{e}.

== Description ==
The codex contains the text of the four Gospels on two volumes, 324 parchment leaves (size 11.1 cm by 8.2 cm).

The text is written in one column per page, 18-21 lines per page.

The first pages in Matthew have a Latin translation on the margin.

== Text ==
Kurt Aland the Greek text of the codex did not place in any Category.

According to the Wisse's Profile Method it represents mixed Byzantine text, related to the textual family K^{r} in Luke 1, Luke 10, and Luke 20.

== History ==
Scrivener and Gregory dated the manuscript to the 13th century. Currently the manuscript is dated by the INTF to the 13th century.

It was added to the list of New Testament manuscript by Gregory (704). It was renumbered by Aland as 2284.

Formerly it was housed in London, in Quaritch (Catalogue 94, No. 145).

Actually the manuscript is housed at the John Rylands University Library (Ms. Gr. 18) in Manchester.

== See also ==
- List of New Testament minuscules
- Biblical manuscript
- Textual criticism
