= Amy Sawyer =

British painter (1863–1945)

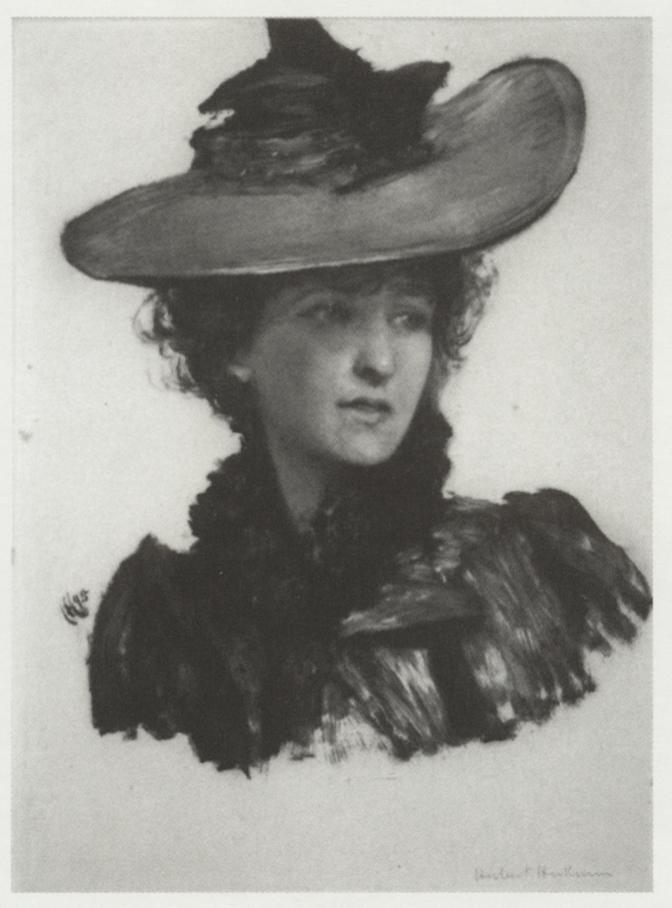
- Portrait by Hubert von Herkomer
- Born: 1863; East Grinstead
- Died: 1 October 1945; Ditchling
- Occupations: Painter, playwright, illustrator
- Relatives: Mabel Ellen Young

Amy Sawyer (1863 – 1 October 1945) was a British painter, illustrator, and playwright in the Arts and Crafts movement. She lived most of her life in Ditchling, East Sussex, England.

== Biography ==
=== Early life ===
Amy Sawyer was born in 1863 in East Grinstead, West Sussex, the oldest of seven children of Charles Sawyer, a draper and grocer, and Eliza Blacklock Sawyer. Her sister was the woodcarver Mabel Ellen Young. In 1885, Sawyer moved to Bushey, Hertfordshire, to attend the Herkomer School of Art, founded by Hubert von Herkomer.

=== Career ===
Her work incorporates folklore, mythology, fairies, and other fantastic themes, and is notable for its depiction of strong female characters. Between 1887 and 1909, she exhibited sixteen times at the Royal Academy. She exhibited her nude depiction of Psyche at the Salon des Beaux Arts in 1907. Few of her works are in public collections; one exception is Gentle Spring Brings her Garden Stuff to Market (1893), in the Russell-Cotes Museum in Bournemouth, Dorset.

Her illustration work appeared in the periodicals Black and White and The Illustrated London News. She also illustrated gift books for Raphael Tuck & Sons.

She illustrated the book Heart of the World, a fantasy novel by H. Rider Haggard set in Aztec Mesoamerica. Of the many artists who produced over a thousand images to accompany his works, Sawyer was the only woman to illustrate a work by Haggard during his lifetime.

She also published an art book with Sands & Co., The Seasons (1905). Every month of the year was illustrated with depictions of women and different flowers corresponding to each month, accompanied by a quotation of poetry.

=== Later life and death ===
Sawyer gave up art around 1913 after lead poisoning robbed her of the use of her right hand. She became a playwright, staging her first play, Love Is Blind, in 1921. Her plays involved similar themes to her artwork and were performed in local Sussex dialect. Twenty-four of her plays were collected in Sussex Village Plays and Others (1934).

Sawyer died on 1 October 1945 at her home in Ditchling.

== Gallery ==
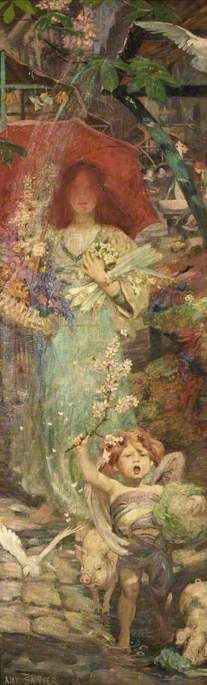
Gentle Spring Brings Her Garden Stuff to Market (1893)

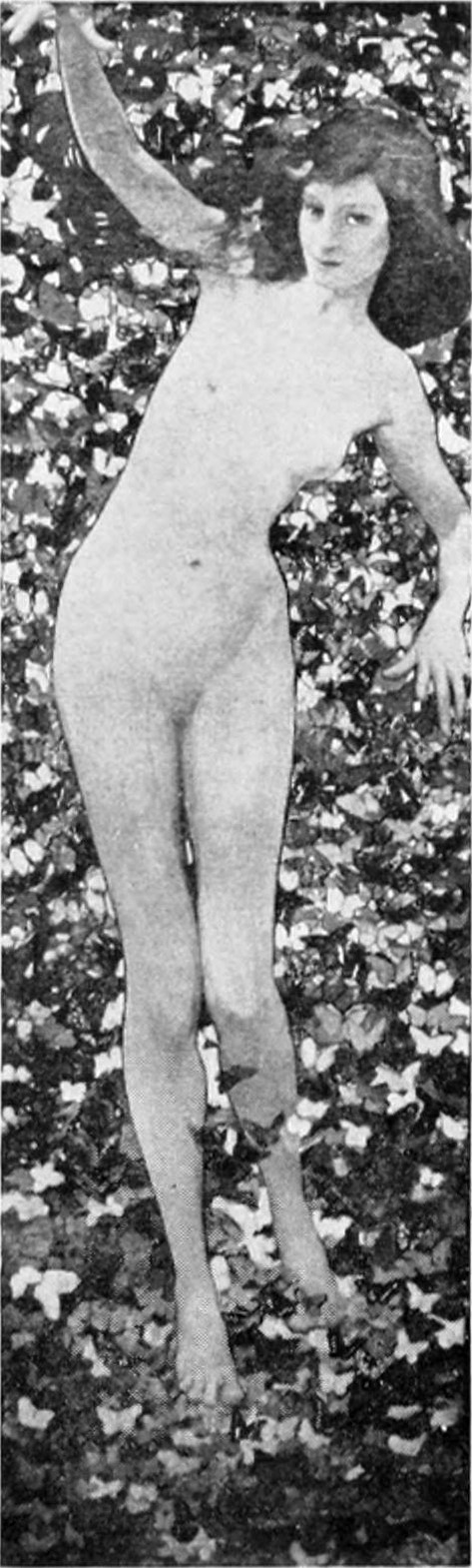
Psyché (1907)

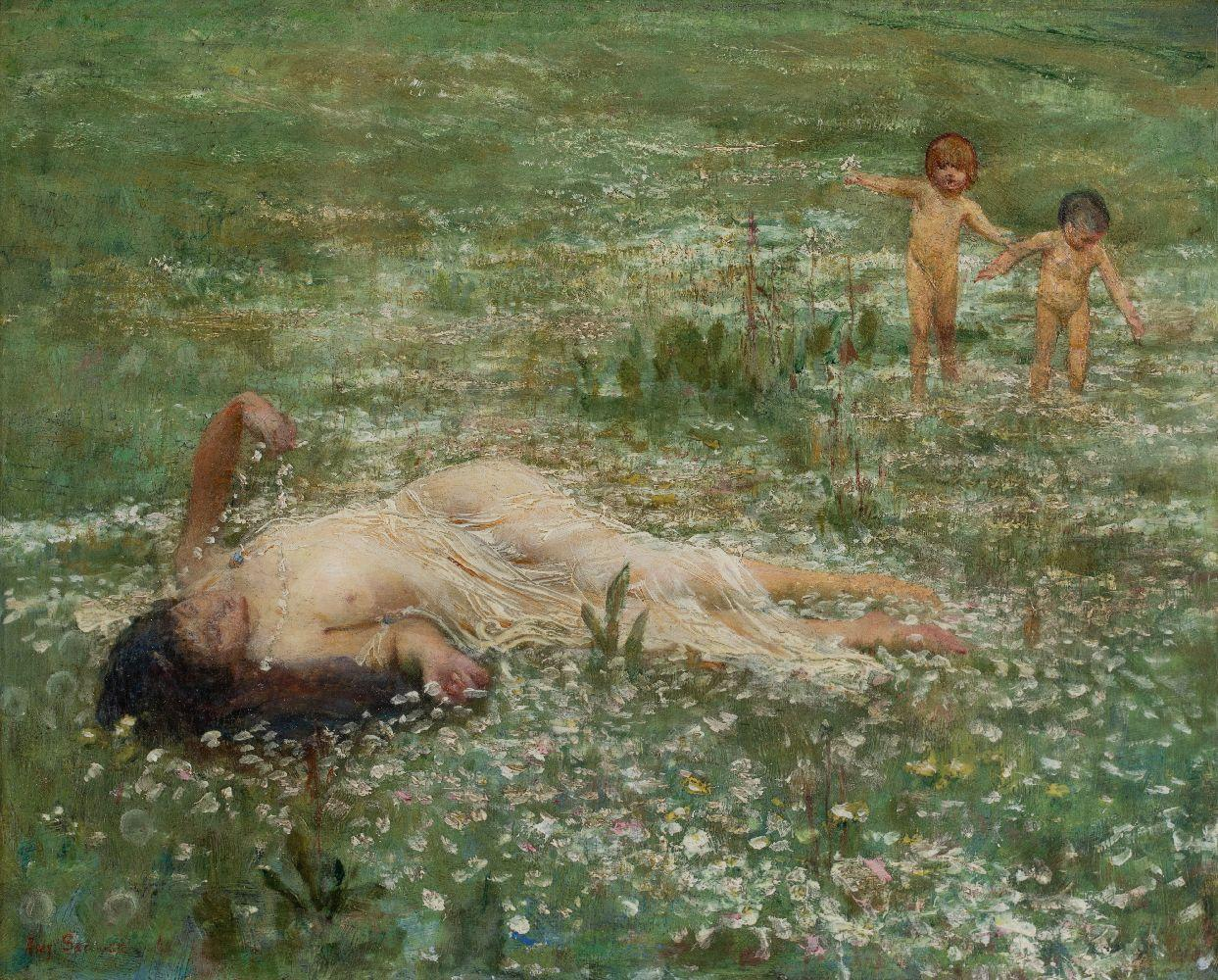
Down in the Valley Where the Daisies Grow (1908)
