= Detskaya Literatura =

Soviet and Russian publishing house for children's literature

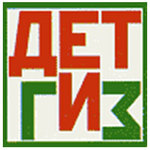
- Status: active
- Predecessor: Detgiz
- Founded: 1933
- Country of origin: Soviet Union, Russia
- Headquarters location: Moscow, Saint Petersburg
- Key people: Oleg Vishnyakov (CEO)
- Fiction genres: children's literature
- Official website: http://www.detlit.ru/

Detskaya Literatura (Russian: Детская литература, romanized: Detskaja literatura, lit. "Children's Literature"), formerly Detgiz and Detizdat, is a Soviet and Russian publishing house for children's literature. It was established on September 9, 1933 by the Communist Party of the Soviet Union on the basis of Molodaya Gvardiya's children's imprint.

The company was initially called Detgiz (Russian: ДЕТГИЗ, Детское государственное издательство, romanized: Detskoe gosudarstvennoe izdatelstvo, lit. "The State Children's Publishing House"). The company had offices in Moscow and Leningrad. The first chief editor was Samuil Marshak. In 1933 Detgiz published 168 titles. In 1937 the headquarters of Detgiz was destroyed, some employees (such as Lydia Chukovskaya) were fired, others were arrested, imprisoned or executed by a firing squad.

The publisher's name was changed numerous times, from Detgiz (1933) to DETIZDAT (1936) to Detgiz again (1941) to Detskaya Literatura (1963). In 1991 the publishing house was divided into the Moscow department, called Detskaya Literatura, and the Saint Petersburg department, called Lyceum or "Lyceum: The State Republican Publishing House for Children and Youth Literature" (Russian: Государственное республиканское издательство детской и юношеской литературы „Лицей“, romanized: Gosudarstvennoe respublikanskoe izdatelstvo detskoj i junosheskoj literatury „Litsej“), which later became DETGIZ.

In the 1980s, the publishing house "Children's Literature" was a republican publishing house directly subordinate to the RSFSR State Committee for Publishing. In 1979-1990 the indicators of the publishing activity of the publishing house were as follows:

Statistics on the number of publications 1979-1990.									1979	1980	1981	1985	1987	1988	1989	1990
Кол-во книг и брошюр, печатных единиц	537	556	557	557	563	549	566	316
Тираж, млн экз.	216,764	224,304	222,0135	245,5381	248,582	269,907	265,322	119,948
Печатных листов-оттисков, млн	1036,6584	1037,0174	1067,8486	1112,2229	1131,9968	1154,6234	1163,2757	608,2764

== Book series ==
- My First Books (Russian: Мои первые книжки, romanized: Moi pervye knizhki)
- One Book After Another (Russian: Книга за книгой, romanized: Kniga za knigoj)
- The World Literature Library for Children and Youth (Russian: Библиотека мировой литературы для детей и юношества, romanized: Biblioteka mirovoj literatury dlja detej i junoshestva)
- School Library (Russian: Школьная библиотека, romanized: Shkolnaja biblioteka)
- Library of Adventures and Science Fiction (Russian: Библиотека приключений и научной фантастики, romanized: Biblioteka priklyucheniy i nauchnoy fantastiki)
- Learn and Know How (Russian: Знай и умей, romanized: Znay i umey)
- Library of a Pioneer (Russian: Библиотека пионера, romanized: Biblioteka pionera)
- Library of Adventures (Russian: Библиотека приключений, romanized: Biblioteka priklyucheniy)
- People. Times. Ideas (Russian: Люди. Время. Идеи, romanized: Lyudi. Vremya. Idei)
- Golden Library (Russian: Золотая библиотека, romanized: Zolotaya biblioteka)
- Schoolboy's Military Library (Russian: Военная библиотека школьника, romanized: Voyennaya biblioteka shkol'nika)
