= Queen of the Dawn =

1925 novel by H. Rider Haggard

Queen of the Dawn: A Love Tale of Old Egypt
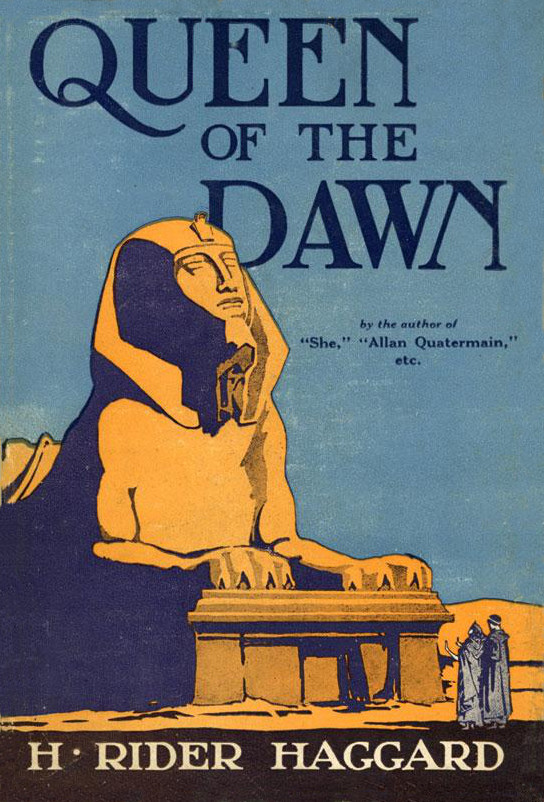
- First US edition
- Author: H. Rider Haggard
- Language: English
- Publisher: Hutchinson & Co (UK); Doubleday, Doran (US)
- Publication date: 1925
- Publication place: United Kingdom

Queen of the Dawn is a 1925 novel by British author H Rider Haggard, set in Ancient Egypt. Written in the early 20th century. The story takes place during a period of war and political turmoil, as the Shepherd Kings invade, challenging the Egyptian Pharaohs. The protagonist, Nefra, the Princess of Egypt, is born into this chaos, her fate intricately tied to her royal lineage. Prophecies and divine blessings from Egyptian goddesses mark her birth, foreshadowing her significant role in the unfolding events.

After the death of King Kheperra, Queen Rima, Nefra's mother, must navigate a dangerous political landscape to protect herself and her child. With the help of loyal allies like Kemmah, her nurse, Rima demonstrates resilience and strength amidst betrayal and conflict. The narrative weaves themes of prophecy, struggle, and hope for a brighter future against the vivid backdrop of ancient Egypt’s rich history.
