= Regeneration (Haggard book) =

Book by Henry Rider Haggard

Regeneration: Being an Account of the Social Work of the Salvation Army in Great Britain
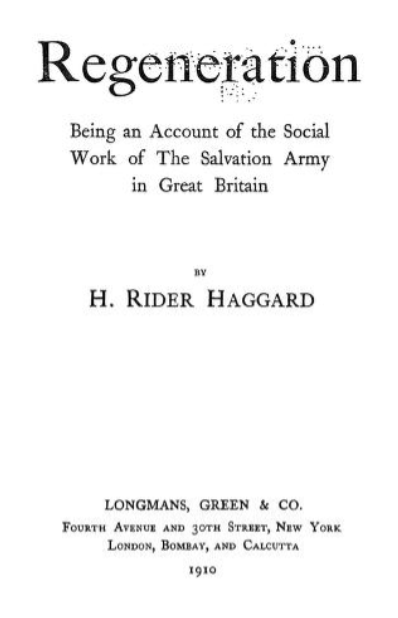
- Title page for Regeneration: Being an Account of the Social Work of the Salvation Army in Great Britain (1910)
- Author: H. Rider Haggard
- Language: English
- Publication date: 1910
- Publication place: United Kingdom

Regeneration: Being an Account of the Social Work of the Salvation Army in Great Britain is a 1910 non fiction book by H. Rider Haggard.
