= The Poor and the Land =

1905 book by H. Rider Haggard

The Poor and the Land: Report on the Salvation Army Colonies in the United States and at Hadleigh, England, with Scheme of National Land Resettlement
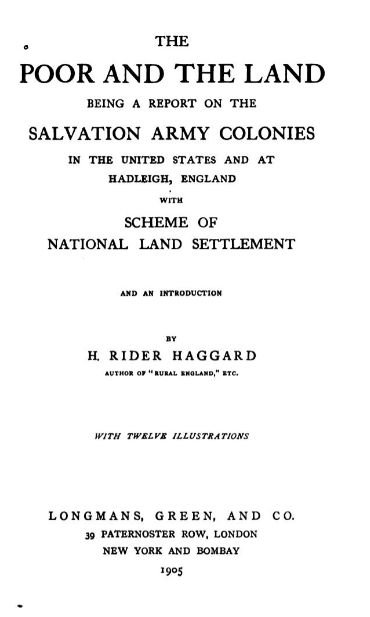
- Author: H. Rider Haggard
- Language: English
- Publication date: 1905
- Publication place: United Kingdom

The Poor and the Land: Report on the Salvation Army Colonies in the United States and at Hadleigh, England, with Scheme of National Land Resettlement is a 1905 book by H. Rider Haggard.
