= Dawn (Haggard novel) =

1884 novel by H. Rider Haggard

- Author: H. Rider Haggard
- Language: English
- Genre: Adventure novel
- Publisher: Hurst and Blackett
- Publication date: 1884
- Publication place: United Kingdom

Dawn is the first novel by British writer H. Rider Haggard published in 1884.

== Background ==
Haggard later said he was inspired to write the book while living in Norwood. He and his wife were attending a church service when they saw sitting near them "a singularly beautiful and pure-faced young lady":

Afterwards we agreed that this semi-divine creature — on whom to the best of my knowledge I have never set eyes again from that day to this — ought to become the heroine of a novel. So then and there we took paper, and each of us began to write the said novel. I think that after she had completed two or three folio sheets my wife ceased from her fictional labours. But, growing interested, I continued mine, which resulted in the story called "Dawn."

Haggard never found out who the girl was but was sufficiently inspired to write the first draft at Norwood in 1882, while studying for the Bar. The novel was originally called Angela, which was the first name of the heroine of the story; Angela was also the name of Haggard's eldest daughter.

Haggard later redrafted the novel several times, one version being called There Remaineth a Rest. He sent it out to several publishers but it was rejected. He rewrote it again and eventually it was accepted by a publisher.

== Reception ==
Haggard later said the thought the novel "ought to have been cut up into several stories" and was too full of "amateur villains". He says the novel "was more or less of a failure — of course I mean at that time, for in after years it became extraordinarily successful." It initially earned Haggard profits of ten pounds.

== Adaptation ==
The novel was filmed in 1917.
