= A Winter Pilgrimage =

1901 book by H Rider Haggard

A Winter Pilgrimage: Being an Account of Travels through Palestine, Italy, and the Island of Cyprus in 1900
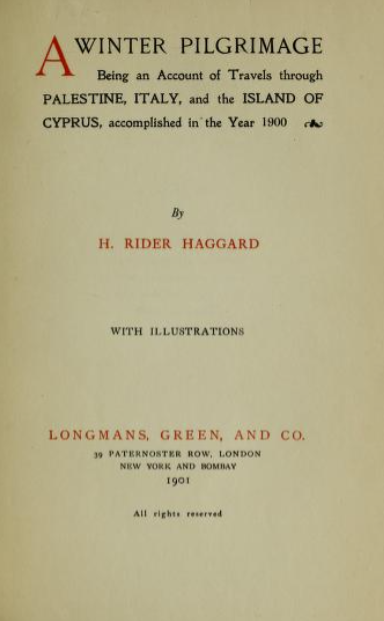
- Title page for A Winter Pilgrimage (1901)
- Author: H. Rider Haggard
- Language: English
- Publication date: 1901
- Publication place: United Kingdom

A Winter Pilgrimage: Being an Account of Travels through Palestine, Italy, and the Island of Cyprus in 1900 is a nonfiction book by H Rider Haggard.

== Reception ==
... In sympathy with the early and mediæval travellers to the Holy Land, he expresses the hope that a thousand years hence his book may serve as a link between these worthies and their unborn successors. No one will begrudge him this pleasure of anticipation. Certainly none of his predecessors in the Age of Faith can have approached the sacred sites in a more reverent spirit, or with a profounder sense of the greatness of the events of which they were the theatre. To the reader, however, the interest of this part of the volume will be largely psychological ...
