= Rural Denmark =

Non-fiction book by H. Rider Haggard

Rural Denmark and Its Lessons
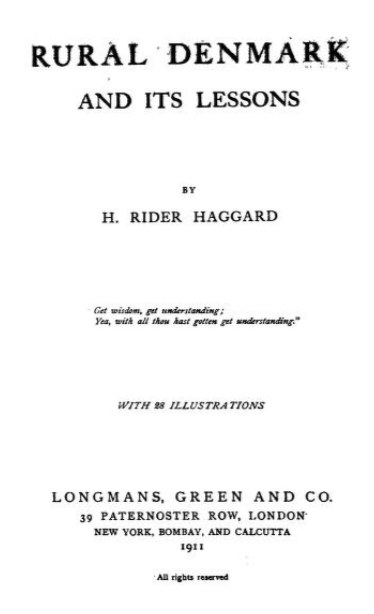
- Title page for Rural Denmark and Its Lessons (1911)
- Author: H. Rider Haggard
- Language: English
- Subject: Denmark
- Publication date: 1911
- Publication place: United Kingdom
- Media type: Print

Rural Denmark and Its Lessons is a non-fiction book by H. Rider Haggard based on his tour of Denmark.
