= The Mahatma and the Hare =

1911 novel by H. Rider Haggard

The Mahatma and the Hare: A Dream Story
- First edition (UK)
- Author: H. Rider Haggard
- Language: English
- Publisher: Longmans Green (UK); Henry Holt (US)
- Publication date: 1911
- Publication place: United Kingdom

The Mahatma and the Hare: A Dream Story is a novel by H. Rider Haggard.
