= Cetywayo and His White Neighbours =

1882 non-fiction book by H. Rider Haggard

Cetywayo and His White Neighbours, or Remarks on Recent Events in Zululand, Natal and the Transvaal
- First edition
- Author: H. Rider Haggard
- Language: English
- Genre: Non fiction
- Publisher: Trubner and Company
- Publication date: 1882
- Publication place: United Kingdom
- Pages: 250

Cetywayo and His White Neighbours, or Remarks on Recent Events in Zululand, Natal and the Transvaal is an 1882 non-fiction book by H. Rider Haggard, his first full-length published work. It was based on his time working in South Africa. The "Cetywayo" of the title is the Zulu king Cetshwayo kaMpande.

== Background ==
Haggard had worked for six years in South Africa. He wrote the book at Norwood in 1881 while also studying for the Bar. He later said it "represented a great amount of labour. I was determined that it should be accurate, and to ensure this I purchased all the Blue-books dealing with the period of which I was treating."

He sent it off to various publishers and only received one offer – from Trubner and Company, who offered to produce 750 copies if Haggard gave them fifty pounds. The author did so.

== Reception ==
The book had some good reviews and Haggard received letters of praise from such figures as Lord Carnarvon and Randolph Churchill but by 1883 had only sold 154 copies, meaning he lost his fifty pounds. A revised edition was published in 1888. Although by this time Haggard had become a popular novelist, the later edition was not popular either. Haggard claims however that an 1899 edition of the portion of the book dealing with the Transvaal sold 30,000 copies.
