= The Way of the Spirit =

1906 novel by H. Rider Haggard

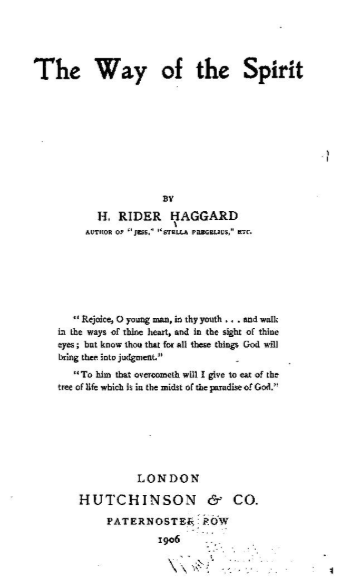
- Title page for The Way of the Spirit (1906)
- Author: H. Rider Haggard
- Language: English
- Publisher: Hutchinson
- Publication date: 1906
- Publication place: United Kingdom

The Way of the Spirit is a 1906 novel by H. Rider Haggard.
