= Red Eve =

Book by Henry Rider Haggard

- First edition (UK)
- Author: H. Rider Haggard
- Cover artist: A. C. Michael
- Language: English
- Publisher: Hodder & Stoughton (UK); Grosset & Dunlap (US)
- Publication date: 1911
- Publication place: United Kingdom

Red Eve is a historical novel with fantasy elements, by British writer H. Rider Haggard, set in the reign of Edward III. Red Eve depicts the Battle of Crécy and the Black Death, and also features a supernatural personification of Death called Murgh.

== Reception ==
Discussing Red Eve, E. F. Bleiler stated "While the personalities are still stereotyped, the tendency to be sententious is not as obtrusive as usual, and the narrative is relatively brisk. The introduction of Murgh as a symbol is successful." Pamela Cleaver called Red Eve a "stirring tale" and said "the incidents...keep one reading until the end". However, Cleaver criticised the novel's characterisation, saying that the book's principal figures were "all stock characters." Darrell Schweitzer described Red Eve as "a later novel of particular interest", saying it began as a "costume romance", but became a weird fiction novel with the "introduction of the character Murgh, a personification of the Black Death." John Scarborough included Red Eve on a list of what he regarded as Haggard's best novels, along with King Solomon's Mines, She, Cleopatra, Eric Brighteyes, and Nada the Lily.
