= Doctor Therne =

1898 novel by H. Rider Haggard

- Author: H. Rider Haggard
- Original title: Doctor Therne; Anti-Vaccinist
- Language: English
- Genre: Science fiction
- Publisher: Longmans, Green, and Co.
- Publication date: 1898
- Publication place: United Kingdom
- Media type: print
- Pages: 232

Doctor Therne is an 1898 novel by H. Rider Haggard, about a smallpox epidemic that sweeps England, which was written as an attack upon the anti-vaccinationist movement of the time.
