= A Gardener's Year =

1905 book by Henry Rider Haggard

- Title page for A Gardener's Year (1905)
- Author: H. Rider Haggard
- Language: English
- Publisher: Longmans, Green
- Publication date: 1905
- Publication place: United Kingdom

A Gardener's Year is a 1905 non-fiction book from H. Rider Haggard.
