= The Last Boer War =

- First edition
- Author: H. Rider Haggard
- Language: English
- Genre: non-fiction
- Publisher: Kegan Paul, Trench, Trübner & Co., Ltd
- Publication date: 1899
- Publication place: United Kingdom

The Last Boer War (American title: A History of the Transvaal) is an 1899 non-fiction book by H. Rider Haggard about the Boer War of 1881. The book consists of a reprint of the portions of Cetywayo and His White Neighbours (1882, second ed. 1888) dealing with the Transvaal, together with a new preface ("Author's Note") and some additional material.
