= Rural England (book) =

Non-fiction book by H. Rider Haggard

Rural England: Being an Account of the Agricultural and Social Researches Carried Out in 1901 & 1902
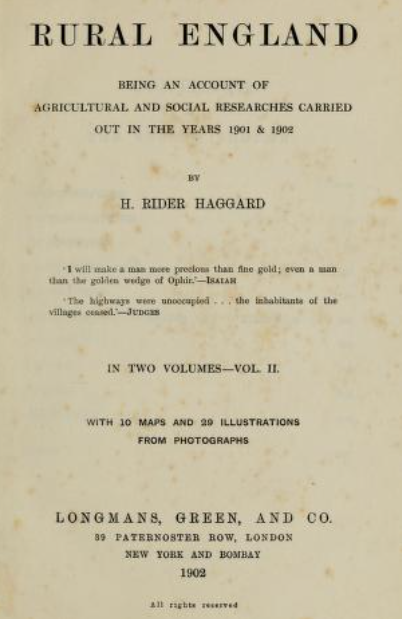
- Title page for Rural England: Being an Account of the Agricultural and Social Researches Carried Out in 1901 & 1902 (1902)
- Author: H. Rider Haggard
- Language: English
- Publication date: 1902
- Publication place: United Kingdom

Rural England: Being an Account of the Agricultural and Social Researches Carried Out in 1901 and 1902 is a nonfiction book by H Rider Haggard.
