= Pearl Maiden =

1903 novel by H. Rider Haggard

Pearl-Maiden: A Tale of the Fall of Jerusalem
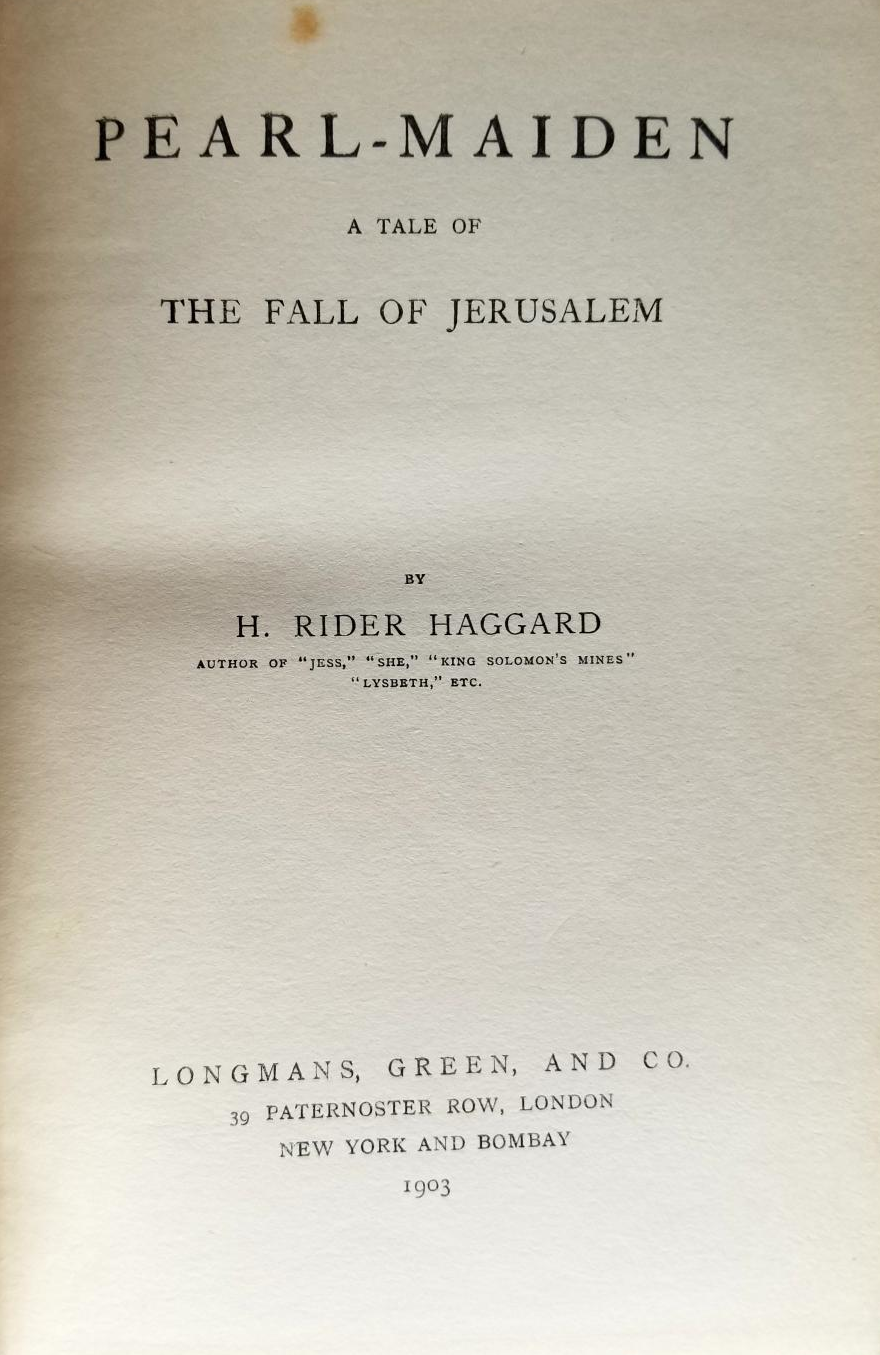
- Title page for Pearl-Maiden: A Tale of the Fall of Jerusalem (1903)
- Author: H. Rider Haggard
- Language: English
- Publication date: 1903
- Publication place: United Kingdom

Pearl-Maiden: A Tale of the Fall of Jerusalem is a novel by the British writer H. Rider Haggard.

It was serialised in the U.S. edition of Pearson's Magazine in ten parts from July 1902 to April 1903.
