= Cleopatra (Haggard novel) =

1889 novel by H. Rider Haggard

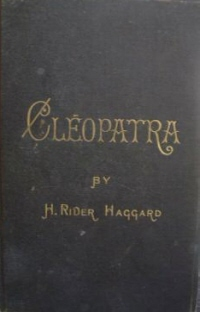
- Cover of the first edition
- Author: H. Rider Haggard
- Language: English
- Genre: Adventure novel
- Publisher: Longmans
- Publication date: 1889
- Publication place: United Kingdom
- Media type: Print (Hardback)
- Pages: 316 pp
- ISBN: 1-55521-122-4
- OCLC: 16862670
- Text: Cleopatra at Wikisource

Cleopatra: Being an Account of the Fall and Vengeance of Harmachis is an adventure novel written by English author H. Rider Haggard and first printed in 1889 by Longmans. Cleopatra mixes historical action with supernatural events, and could be described as a historical fantasy novel.

== Synopsis ==
The story is set in the Ptolemaic era of Ancient Egyptian history and revolves around the survival of a dynasty bloodline protected by the Priesthood of Isis. The main character Harmachis (the living descendant of the pharaoh's bloodline) is charged by the Priesthood to overthrow the supposed impostor Cleopatra, drive out the Greeks and Romans and restore Egypt to its golden era. Harmachis attempts to use his priestly magic to undermine Cleopatra's rule.

As is the case with the majority of Haggard's works, the story draws heavily upon adventure and exotic concepts. The story, told from the point of view of the Egyptian priest Harmachis, is recounted in biblical language, being in the form of papyrus scrolls found in a tomb.

== Reception ==
Boucher and McComas gave the novel a mixed review, saying that it combined "a not always believable portrait" of its title heroine with a "fascinating, wholly convincing" story line. Curtis C. Smith described Cleopatra as "one of Haggard's best works, particularly for those modern readers who may find the implied defenses of colonialism in the Allan Quatermain and She series difficult to take." Smith added "Haggard's originality is to side with this indigenous culture against the Ptolemies and the Roman imperialists who threaten Egypt." John Scarborough included Cleopatra on a list of what he regarded as Haggard's best novels, along with King Solomon's Mines, She: A History of Adventure, Nada the Lily, Red Eve, and Eric Brighteyes.

== See also ==
- Harmachis
- Cleopatra, a 1917 film based on the novel
