= The Wizard (novel) =

1896 novel by H. Rider Haggard

- Cover of The Wizard
- Author: H. Rider Haggard
- Language: English
- Genre: Adventure novel
- Publication date: 1896
- Publication place: United Kingdom

The Wizard is a novel by Henry Rider Haggard, first published by Longmans, Green, and Co., in 1896. The Wizard is one of the many examples of imperialist literature.

The story is a third-person narrative that follows the journey of Reverend Thomas Owen as he seeks to carry out missionary work in south central Africa, specifically in the tribe of Amasuka. The novel starts in England in the parish of Reverend Thomas Owen and moves to South Central Africa, where the tribe of Amasuka (People of Fire) is located, which is where the majority of the novel takes place. While there, he encounters Hokosa, the chief of the Wizards who essentially wishes him to prove that his God is greater than their god through trials of lightning.

The novel is placed in the imperialist literature of 19th-century England. Just like many of his other works, this novel is inspired by Rider Haggard's experiences of South Africa and British colonialism. The character Noma is meant to be representative of the theme of female authority and feminine behavior. Some scholars have called the novel “a tale of victorious faith.” It has received both praise and criticism for its representation of the imperialist novel and of womanhood.

== Synopsis ==
The novel begins on a Sunday afternoon in summer at a church in the Midland county called Busscombe. Reverend Thomas Owen had a preacher for the day called a “Deputation,” who was sent to arouse the indifferent to the duty of converting the savage tribes by collecting money. As the “Deputation” told about his experience with a south central African tribe called the “Sons of Fire,” Reverence Owen became very interested in the mission to convert this tribe of Amasuka and converting them. Reverend Owen ultimately decides to take on this task and gives his old job to the “Deputation.”

Two years go by as Reverend Owen lives in a hut outside of the tribe's town and he sends his newly converted native of the tribe, John, to send a message to King Umsuka which is that Reverend Owen wants to learn their language so that he can administer the word of God to them. After being warned that the People of Fire have their faith too, John informs Rev. Owen that if he cannot perform the magic they want him to perform, he will be killed. Reverend Owen learns of Hokosa and Hafela's plot to kill the king with poison in order to gain the throne through a vision. Rev. Owen learns of the anecdote to the poison in another vision of the Tree of Death and uses this knowledge to his advantage by giving it to Umsuka to revive him at the Feast of the First-Fruit and therefore “proves” his God's power over the People of Fire's god. In the “First Trial by Fire,” Hokosa and Umsuka show Rev. Owen their god – an oddly sized stone – and explain that the lightning god knows Hokosa and the other wizards so they will not harm them, but will harm Rev. Owen if he goes through the trial in the plain full of iron. When the lightning from the storm does not harm Rev. Owen, the People of Fire respect him but many are convinced it is magic, not the work of God.

In the second trial by Fire, Hokosa and his counsel stand on one side of the plain while Rev. Owen, John, and Nodwengo stand on the other with the cross and the instructions that whoever is left standing is more powerful. After the storm, the only ones left standing are Hokosa, Rev. Owen, John, and Nodwengo – finally proving that Rev. Owen's God is more powerful, even though many in the tribe were still suspicious of this new religion.

After the death of Umsuka and the rise of Nodwengo, Hokosa and his new wife, Noma, go to the grave of Umsuka to ask for his counsel through magic. Umsuka speaks through Noma's body and tells him that he will conquer Rev. Owen but that at his death he will await his trial for his sins during his life. Following this event, Noma gives birth to a stillborn child and Hokosa tells her that she must go on a journey of purification. On this journey he instructs her to find Hafela and give him the message that Hokosa will help him regain his throne if he is made second in command.

Hokosa sends poison and poison fruit with a woman from the town and the fruit is given to Rev. Owen to eat. After feeling regret for his actions, although it is too late for Rev. Owen, Hokosa asks for forgiveness and is converted to Christianity and is ultimately baptized by Rev. Owen. In the meantime, Noma has found Hafela and tells him of the plans to fight Nodwengo. When Noma comes back to Hokosa, she learns that Hokosa has already told Rev. Owen and Nodwengo of all the plans that Hafela has to attack the town so that they may be ready when the time comes. After Rev. Owen's death from the poison given to him, the fight between the army of Nodwengo and Hafela ensues. On the second day of the battle, Noma makes a plan to bring Hokosa out in the open so that they can kill him since he is the one with Rev. Owen's power now. Hokosa is captured and crucified on top of the Tree of Death. As Hokosa is dying on the cross, he instructs Nodwengo to spare the life of Hafela's army so that peace can be in the land. Hafela says he will go and take his servants with him and stabs himself in the heart and dies. Noma climbs the Tree of Death to Hokosa, stabs him in the heart and jumps from the tree, lands on a rock and dies. The cross ultimately prevails in the end.

=== Characters ===
- Thomas Owen: preacher who goes to Sons of Fire to convert them to Christianity
- Deputation: missionary who came to speak to Rev. Owen's congregation about the importance of converting savage tribes – went to the Sons of Fire and his partner was killed
- Hokosa: Chief of the Wizards and first prophet of King Umsuka
- Umsuka: King and father of Hafela and Nodwengo
- John: converted native of the People of Fire who helps Rev. Owen
- Prince Nodwengo: half brother of Hafela, son of Umsuka, eventually becomes King
- Hafela: son of Umsuka who tries to kill him to gain the thrown and is then exiled
- Noma: the love of Hafela and Hokosa, Hafela gives her back to Hokosa in exchange for the rights to the throne – which he does not get
- Council of Wizards: group of the elite in the tribe who have “magical powers” and are the only ones who can survive lightning from their lightning god
- People of Fire: tribe of Amasuka

== Background ==
=== South Africa and H. R. Haggard ===
Haggard was an English writer of adventure novels set in predominantly Africa. He was also involved in agricultural reform throughout the British Empire. His stories, sited at the end of Victorian literature, continue to be prevalent and important.

In 1875, Haggard's father sent him to South Africa to take up a position as the secretary to Sir Henry Bulwer, Lieutenant Governor of the Colony of Natal. Three of his books, The Wizard (1896), Elissa: The Doom of Zimbabwe (1899), and Black Heart and White Heart: A Zulu Idyll (1900), are dedicated to Burnham's daughter, Nada, the first white child born in Bulawayo and was named after Haggard's 1892 book Nada the Lily. In addition, Haggard helped to establish British control over the Boer republic as well as raise the Union flag over the capital, Pretoria, in May 1877. Many critiques claim there is a heavy emphasis on South African race relations and on the large number of native authors in that region. According to Rebecca Stott, “The penetration of Africa in Haggard’s novels is a way for the male characters to prove their strength, virility and manliness.” During the late 9th century, public attention had focused much of its time to Africa. Furthermore, she explains that Haggard's literary career began in the 1880s when public interest in Africa had reached a peak and when he himself had just returned from six years of public service in South Africa.

=== Publication ===
The Wizard was first published in 1896 in London.

=== Genre ===
The Wizard is a strong example of the adventure romance that was popular at the end of the 19th century, while still being very prevalent today. Adventure romance is a subgenre of the romance genre. They are often characterized with romantic suspense featuring strong heroes and fast-moving plots. In 19th century British literature, adventure romance typically takes place in a foreign space, usually a colonial enterprise of the British empire. This novel has some significant developmental effects on the development of the adventure novel as well. For example, Reverend Owen's movement from England to south central Africa is common in the adventure novel. In addition, H. Rider Haggard has been credited with the invention of the romance genre by many critiques.

This novel is also an example of the imperial adventure novel, which is evident from the colonialism and its effect on the novel. The idea of missionary work that was very prevalent in the 19th century shapes some of the major themes of the novel through the lens of the imperial adventure novel. Critiques such as Richard F. Patteson explain that the imperialist adventure novel involves exploration of uncharted regions by Europeans, which is essentially what this novel portrays.

== Themes ==
=== Imperialism ===
Colonial imperialism in the British Empire is prevalent through the idea that Christianity can be used to convert the colonies under England and make them more “civilized,” in other words, more British. New imperialism began in the last quarter of the 19th century when there was further expansion of British power, particularly in Africa and there was more emphasis on English forms of civilization. This new imperialism became known as the “British view of the world.” According to Richard F. Patteson, author of the article “Manhood and Misogyny in the Imperialist Romance,” the imperialist romance flourished between 1880 and 1920 and, “is essentially and adventure story involving the exploration by Europeans of previously uncharted regions.” He further claims that H. Rider Haggard first popularized this theme of imperialism in the form of romance and ultimately established a degree of influence. This theme is seen in the novel in Reverend Owen's mission to convert the People of Fire to Christianity. He travels to a foreign place, which is also an African region of the British empire, in an effort to spread the word of the Christian God. This establishes the idea of new imperialism through the lens of the "British view of the world" by attempting to bring British values to foreign lands.

=== Christianity and missionary work in the 19th century ===
Pastors from Britain completed the missionary work done in Africa during the 19th century, for the most part. They would seek to change the tribes “savage ways,” which in turn brought up the racism that is an underlying theme in many of Haggard's novels. The idea of the Christian God as the ultimate God and the idolatry seen in the novel underlies the theme of this missionary work. For example, the People of Fire idolatrize a rock and lightning, but Reverend Thomas Owen conquers this idolatry in the First and Second Trial by Fire, therefore proving that his God was the greatest and could conquer all. According to critique Richer Patteson, “The Europeans' goals are usually ambivalent: the intention to convert the heathen or establish a benevolent order is frequently associated with an equally strong desire for wealth and power. Often the white men stumble upon ruins of an ancient civilization (presumed to be white), and just as often, they encounter two native factions – one "barbarous," the other willing to be "civilized" by the European visitors.”

=== Female authority and sexuality ===
The character Noma is an example of the New Woman and the idea that Haggard consistently portrays in many of his novels that in order to prevail in society, the New Woman must be stopped and then taught that her actions are not moral or correct. In late-Victorian Britain, women and womanhood was beneath manhood and were “seen, not heard.” Noma seems to be the opposite of what a typical woman during this time period would be. She worshiped power and sought to become the most powerful by attempting to seduce two men (Hokosa and Hafela). Ultimately, however, this power struggle was her downfall that is a common trend in Haggard's novels. Haggard traditionally seemed to dislike women in power, so this downfall of Noma is seemingly typical of the novel.

In addition, Noma's sex appeal is a theme that can be associated with the idea of the New Woman. She successfully seduces two men in the novel, both of which hold a position of power. Not only does she wish to obtain this power, but she is also attracted to sorcery and magic. Because this is her downfall, Haggard defeats the “New Woman ideal”.

According to Patteson, “Female characters appear in all genres of popular literature, but the roles they are assigned seldom present women in a very favorable light. With the exception of the sentimental romance or "love story" - a form specifically aimed at a female audience - women do not usually figure as protagonists. Instead their function is to support, or to foil, the actions of male heroes in a variety of ways. Women are identified with the earth, while the men who bring light to various dark continents are linked to the sun, moon, and stars. Nearly every imperialist romance includes the hero's descent into a womb-like cave or mine shaft from which he usually escapes by summoning his "masculine" inner resources - courage, self-control, and ingenuity. One of the greatest dangers frequently faced by the explorers is power in the hands of a woman. This power is characteristically wielded through a combination of sexual enticement and maternal possessiveness. The fear and hatred of women evident everywhere in the imperialist romance can be explained partially, at least, by the imperialists' hunger for domination. Victorian imperialism was a masculine imperative. The most common complaint against women in the imperialist romance is their interference between friends. Not infrequently male friends are said to be bound by "'a love passing the love of a woman."'12 Women threaten such friendships, and marriage is presented as a betrayal of male camaraderie.” In addition, Rebecca Stott claims that the “impulse” to draw away the veil from the woman is uncontrollable and that it must be confronted. According to Patricia Murphy, author of the article “The Gendering of History in She,” the New Woman is another manifestation of all women, whose dangerous effects upon men replicate those of her mythic counterparts. She explains that discourse on time play an important role in the construction of gender positions in late-century novels responding to the New Woman, such as Haggard's novels.

== Critical reception ==
Haggard's stories are still widely read today. In 1965, Haggard was called a writer of a consistently high level of “literary skill and sheer imaginative power” by Roger Lancelyn Green, one of the Oxford Inklings. Anne McClintock and Laura Chrisman both read Haggard as an important indicator of public opinion on African matters and a representative of the British imperial presence in southern Africa. Monsman, another critique, referred to many of the films made from Haggard's African novels and suggests that Haggard was “a century ahead of popular cultural curve.” Africa was a setting where British boys could become men and British men, like Haggard's heroes, could behave like boys with license. Africa was a great testing ground for moral growth and moral deterioration. It forms part of a genre of 'innocent' adventure fiction, designed for the white man or boy, and promising the absence of petticoats and conventional romance. Some critics, such as Lindy Stiebel, saw Haggard as “a more contradictory and ambiguous ‘imperialist.’”
