= Lysbeth =

1901 novel by H. Rider Haggard

Lysbeth: A Tale of the Dutch
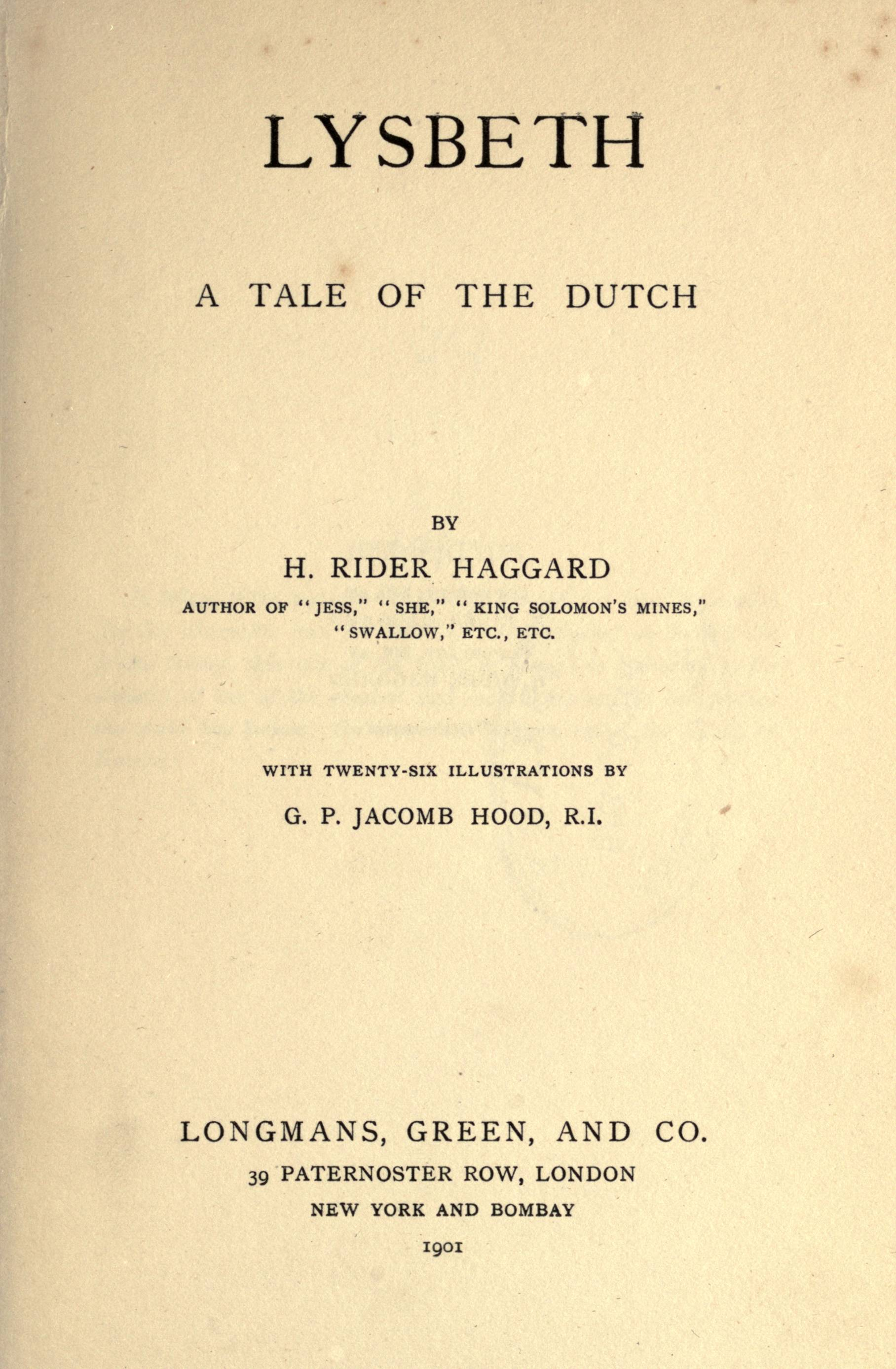
- Lysbeth: A Tale of the Dutch book cover
- Author: H. Rider Haggard
- Language: English
- Publisher: Longmans, Green & Co
- Publication date: 1901
- Publication place: United Kingdom

Lysbeth: A Tale of the Dutch is a 1901 novel by H. Rider Haggard. Lysbeth is a historical novel set in the Netherlands during the time of William the Silent.

== Reception ==
The Spectator magazine, reviewing Lysbeth, said "Mr. Haggard handles all this romantic material with his accustomed vigor and dexterity." The review also said "Lovers of historical romance will enjoy Lysbeth, and readers not very familiar with those wonderful pages in the history of the Netherlands will welcome so pleasant an opportunity as Mr. Haggard affords for rubbing up their rusty knowledge."
