= Heart of the World (novel) =

1895 novel by Henry Rider Haggard

- Author: H. Rider Haggard
- Illustrator: Amy Sawyer
- Language: English
- Genre: Adventure novel
- Publication date: 1895
- Publication place: United Kingdom

Heart of the World is an 1895 book by H. Rider Haggard about a lost Mayan city in Mexico. Its importance in the history of fantasy literature was recognized by its republication by the Newcastle Publishing Company as the tenth volume of the Newcastle Forgotten Fantasy Library in September 1976.

== Illustrations ==
Amy Sawyer illustrated the book. Of the many artists who produced over a thousand images to accompany his works, Sawyer was the only woman to illustrate a work by Haggard during his lifetime.

== Reception ==
In his study of early science fiction, E. F. Bleiler described Heart of the World as "rich in detail, ingenious and well plotted, but weak in characterization at times. Bleiler also wrote that the novel's "moral message" and its "sense of tragedy" were both "powerfully conveyed".
