= Bernard Quaritch =

German-born British bookseller and collector (1819–1899)

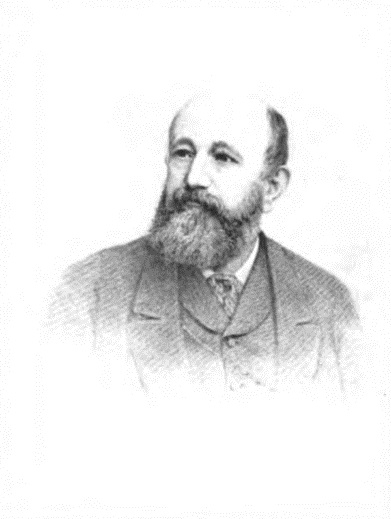
Bernard Quaritch

Bernard Alexander Christian Quaritch (/ˈkwɒrɪtʃ/ KWORR-itch; April 23, 1819 – December 17, 1899) was a German-born British bookseller and collector.

The company established by Bernard Quaritch in 1847 lives on in London as Bernard Quaritch Ltd, dealing in rare books and manuscripts, as well as publishing books.

== Early life ==
Quaritch was born in Worbis, Germany. After being apprenticed to a bookseller, he went to London in 1842, and was employed by Henry Bohn, the publisher. (Note: For Bernard Quaritch (1819-1899), who came to London from Germany in 1842 and in 1847 founded the bookselling business that still bears his name, see Freeman, Arthur. "Quaritch, Bernard Alexander Christian". Oxford Dictionary of National Biography (online ed.). Oxford University Press. doi:10.1093/ref:odnb/22943. (Subscription, Wikipedia Library access or UK public library membership required.))

== Work in London ==
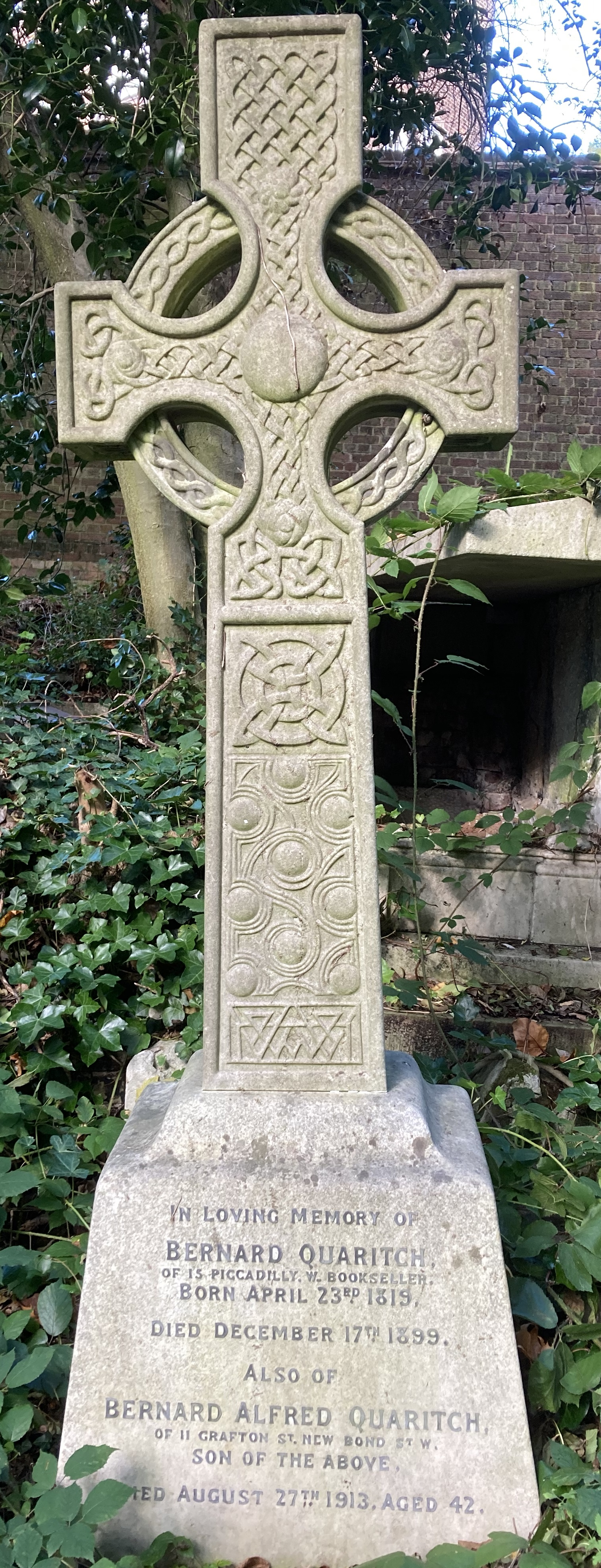
Grave of Bernard Quaritch and his son in Highgate Cemetery

In 1847 he started a bookseller's business off Leicester Square, becoming naturalized as a British subject. In 1848 he started to issue a monthly Catalogue of Foreign and English Books. About 1858 he began to purchase rare books, one of the earliest of such purchases being a copy of the Mazarin Bible (usually known as the Gutenberg Bible), and within a period of forty years he possessed six separate copies of this rare and valuable edition.

In 1860 he moved to Piccadilly. In 1873 he published the Bibliotheca Xylographica, Typographica et Palaeographica, a remarkable catalogue of early productions of the printing press of all countries. He became a regular buyer at all the principal book-sales of Europe and America, and from time to time published a variety of other catalogues of old books. Amongst these may be mentioned the Supplemental Catalogue (1877), and in 1880 an immense catalogue of considerably over 2,000 pages. The last complete catalogue of his stock was published in 1887-88 under the title General Catalogue of Old Books and Manuscripts, in seven volumes, increased with subsequent supplements to twelve. All these catalogues are of considerable bibliographical value. By this time Quaritch had developed the largest trade in old books in the world.

Among the books that he published was Edward Fitzgerald's translation of Omar Khayyám's poetry collection Rubaiyat of Omar Khayyam. He was also the agent for the publications of the British Museum and the Society of Antiquaries.

He died at Hampstead, London, leaving the business to his son Bernard Alfred Quaritch, who died in 1913. Both father and son are buried together on the western side of Highgate Cemetery. The business survives to this day.

== Works and publications ==
- Catalogue of Works on European Philology and the Minor European Languages. 1878.
- A General Catalogue of Books Arranged in Classes. London. 1870.
- A Catalogue of Books of the History, Geography... London. 1886.
- A Catalogue of Works in Oriental Languages. London. 1886.

== See also ==
- Book trade in the United Kingdom
- Books in the United Kingdom
- Shapira Scroll, a set of leather strips inscribed in Paleo-Hebrew script, declared as forgeries and bought by Quaritch in 1885
