= Bernard Alfred Quaritch =

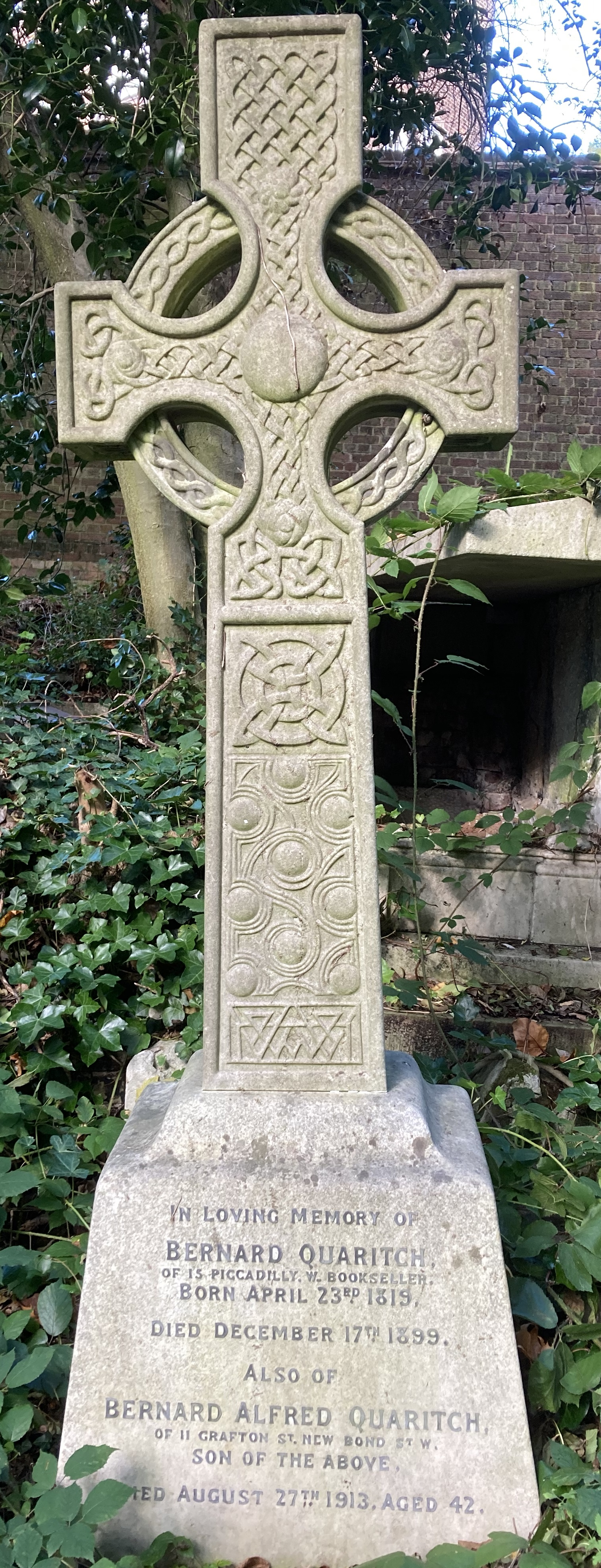
Grave of Bernard Alfred Quaritch and his father in Highgate Cemetery

Bernard Alfred Quaritch (13 January 1871 – 27 August 1913) was the son of antiquarian book dealer Bernard Quaritch, and continued his father's business in London until his own death in Brighton on 27 August 1913.

According to journalist and book collector Bernard Falk (1882-1960),

Part of his achievement was to build up the libraries of such U.S.A. Multi-millionaires as J. Pierpont Morgan, H.C. Folger, He.E. Huntington, Robert Hoe and J.E. Widener, all of whom had the greatest faith in his judgment, advice and business probity.

— Bernard Falk, Bouquets for Fleet Street: memories and musings over fifty years, p. 403

The business survives to this day.
