= Eternal Love (Persian TV series) =

Iranian Persian Farsi language reality show

Eternal Love (Persian: عشق ابدی (IPA: /eʃqe æbædiː/) (Romanized: Eshghe Abadi)) is a Persian-language reality show that premiered on YouTube in 2025. The show is hosted by Parastoo Salehi. As of January 9, 2026, 179 episodes have been released. Each season is 100 episodes long. The series focuses on the romantic relationships among participants. It features a $30,000 prize pool for the winning couple. The filming takes place in Turkey, as to not be caught immediately by the Islamic Republic of Iran.

== Cast ==
Here is a list of the cast in this reality show:

- Host Parastoo Salehi

Season 1:

- Mahrokh "Moon Face" Mehri
- Negar Yousefi
- Parisa "Pixie" Abdollahi
- Zahra Mohammadi
- Sevda Dadloo
- Tannaz Kamali
- Taraneh Ziaee
- Amirhossein Peyvandeh
- Farshad Jahangiri
- Siavash Naemi
- Milad Chaleki
- Shahin Moazzen
- Dr. Pezhman Behroozi
- Elahe "Eli" Jabbari
- Danial Sasani
- Mahbod Mahmoudi
- Bahar Safari
- Mohadese Moradi

== Controversy ==
By November 15, 2025, the Islamic Republic of Iran's regime's judiciary has put out arrest warrant for the production and cast and crew team, Followed by another Persian-language reality show, "Zan-e Rooz". As So, Eternal Love is banned in Iran, followed by a few dozen other countries mainly in the Islamic world, though still able to watch with a VPN.

Other minor controversies include a part in Season 1, Episode 25, when Iranian feminists almost canceled one of this show's contestants, as due to a male contestant Siavash saying that he wants to "hit" the women sitting next to him, Taraneh. But these exact words made her cry after hours. Then, Siavash exclaimed that it was just emotional pressure, and not true physical violence. But Taraneh warns him that any form of corporal punishment will eliminate the contestant.
