= Eric Brighteyes =

1891 novel by H. Rider Haggard

- First edition (publ. Longman)
- Author: H. Rider Haggard
- Language: English
- Publisher: Longmans & Co.
- Publication date: 1891
- Publication place: United Kingdom
- Pages: 302

Eric Brighteyes is an epic Viking novel by H. Rider Haggard that concerns the adventures of its eponymous principal character in 10th-century Iceland. The novel was first published in 1891 by Longmans, Green & Company. It was illustrated by Lancelot Speed.

== Plot summary ==
Eric Thorgrimursson, nicknamed "Brighteyes" for his most notable trait, strives to win the hand of his beloved, Gudruda the Fair. Her father Asmund, a priest of the old Norse gods, opposes the match, believing Eric to be a man without prospects. Deadlier by far are the intrigues of Swanhild, Gudruda's half-sister and a sorceress, who desires Eric for herself. She persuades the chieftain Ospakar Blacktooth to woo Gudruda, making the two men enemies. Battles, intrigues, and treachery follow.

== Background ==
Haggard wrote the book in late 1888, following a visit to Iceland.

== Pioneer of the genre ==
The novel was an early example (and Haggard's introduction implies that it was the first) of modern efforts in English at pastiching saga literature. It clearly shows the influence of the pioneering saga translations by William Morris and Eirikr Magnusson in the late 1860s.

Science fiction historian David Pringle has stated that Eric Brighteyes, with its outcast hero and emphasis on violent conflict, "in many ways resembles a Sword & Sorcery epic before its time".

== Reception ==
Anthony Boucher and J. Francis McComas praised Eric Brighteyes, saying that "nothing has been written in English that matches this complete comprehension of the blend of the fury and mysticism that was that greatest of anomalies, the Viking." Pamela Cleaver described Eric Brighteyes as the best of Haggard's historical novels. She stated that "there is a wonderful atmosphere with saga overtones in this doom-laden tale."

John Scarborough included Eric Brighteyes on a list of what he regarded as Haggard's best novels, along with King Solomon's Mines, She, Cleopatra, Nada the Lily, and Red Eve.

In The Stanley Kubrick Archive Oral History Project Web Video Series "Finding and Developing the Story", Kubrick's eldest daughter Katharina mentions the book as one that "he was particularly interested in". Anthony Frewin states the book was "very, very dear to him" and claims that, "had he lived, I'm sure he would have done it" as a film.

== Publication ==
The novel was republished by the Newcastle Publishing Company under the title The Saga of Eric Brighteyes as the second volume of the Newcastle Forgotten Fantasy Library series in March 1974, and first issued as a mass market paperback by Zebra Books in 1978.

== Sequel ==
A sequel, Eric Brighteyes #2: A Witch's Welcome, written by Sigfriour Skaldaspillir (the pseudonym of Mildred Downey Broxon) was published in 1979.
