= The Lady of Blossholme =

1909 novel by H. Rider Haggard

- First edition
- Author: H. Rider Haggard
- Language: English
- Publisher: Hodder & Stoughton
- Publication date: 1909
- Publication place: United Kingdom

The Lady of Blossholme is a 1909 historical novel by H. Rider Haggard. It is set during the time of Henry VIII, and features the Pilgrimage of Grace.
