= Fair Margaret =

1907 novel by H. Rider Haggard

- 1923 edition
- Author: H. Rider Haggard
- Illustrator: J. R. Skelton
- Language: English
- Publisher: Hutchinson
- Publication date: 1907
- Publication place: United Kingdom

Fair Margaret (published in the United States as Margaret) is a 1907 novel by British writer H. Rider Haggard, set in the time of Henry VII of England. The plot features the abduction of the titular heroine and her adventures in Spain, including a meeting with King Ferdinand and Queen Isabella of Spain.

== Reception ==
Reviewing the novel, Frederic Taber Cooper praised Margaret. Cooper stated: "Mr. Haggard has the craft of a born stage manager, and thanks to his gorgeous scenery, his thronging troops of soldiers, sailors, courtiers, black-robed inquisitors, and languishing Spanish maids, he brings his story to a triumphant and happy solution, and sends us away with the feeling that we have witnessed a big, spectacular show that was eminently worth while."
