= Love Eternal (novel) =

1918 novel by H. Rider Haggard

- First edition (UK)
- Author: H. Rider Haggard
- Language: English
- Publisher: Cassell & Co (UK); Longmans Green (US)
- Publication date: 1918
- Publication place: United Kingdom

Love Eternal is a novel by H. Rider Haggard, first published in 1918.
