= Colonel Quaritch, VC =

1888 novel by H. Rider Haggard

Colonel Quaritch, V.C.: A Tale of Country Life
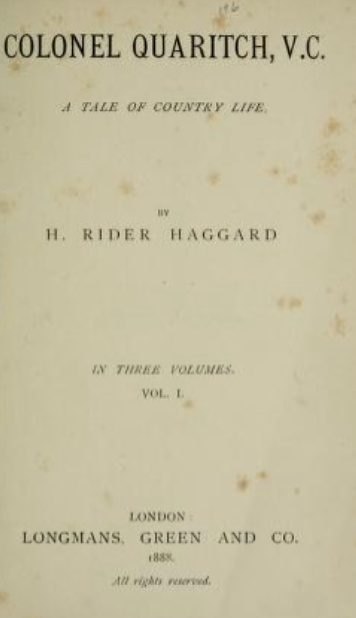
- Title page (1888)
- Author: H. Rider Haggard
- Language: English
- Publication date: 1888
- Publication place: United Kingdom

Colonel Quaritch, V.C.: A Tale of Country Life is an 1888 novel by H. Rider Haggard.

== Reception ==
Gary Westfahl described Colonel Quaritch, V.C. as "feeble".
