= Maryland, London =

Area in East London, England

Coordinates: 51.547878°N 0.00573°W

Maryland
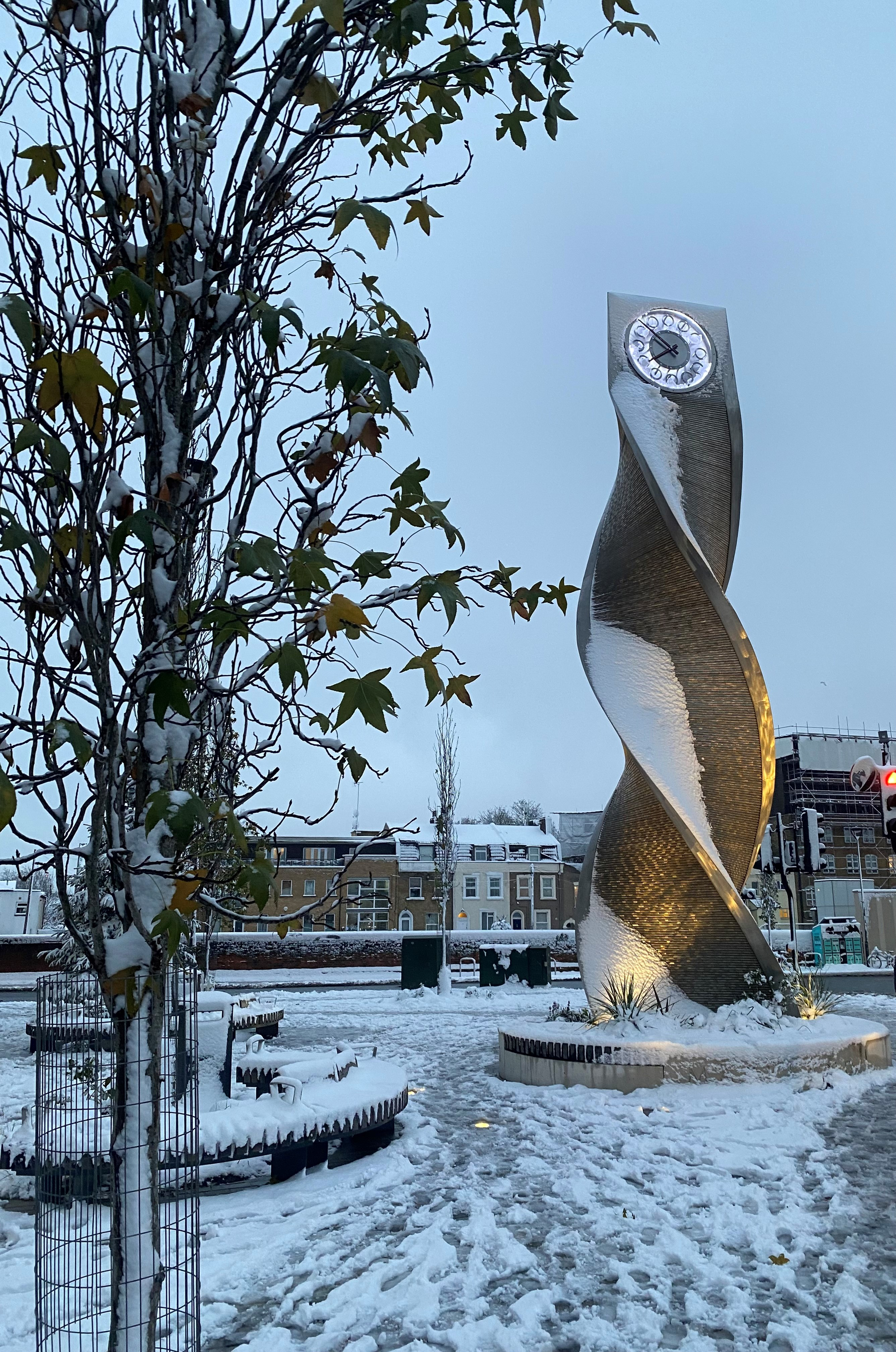
- Maryland in 2023

- Location within Greater London
- OS grid reference: TQ3826385158
- Newham
- Region: London
- Country: England
- Sovereign state: United Kingdom
- Ward: Maryland, Newham
- Post town: LONDON
- Postcode district: E15, E7
- Dialling code: 020
- Police: Metropolitan
- Fire: London
- Ambulance: London
- UK Parliament: Stratford and Bow
- London Assembly: City and East

Maryland is a neighbourhood in Stratford in London, United Kingdom. It is in the London Borough of Newham. The community centres around Maryland Station and borders Leytonstone to the north, Stratford New Town to the west and Forest Gate to the east, with Stratford town centre to the south-west.

== History ==
Maryland's earliest known recorded appearance is on a map of Essex published by J. Oliver in 1696, where it is marked as Maryland Point. The origin of the name is uncertain:

- One popular theory is that it originated with a rich local merchant who bought land and built in the area having returned from the then American colony of Maryland. If true, then London's Maryland would be an unusual example of a place in Britain named after an American location. Various attempts have been made to identify such a merchant. Richard Lee I, who emigrated to the English colony of Virginia around 1640 and became a tobacco planter and merchant, had an estate which included land on the Maryland side of the Potomac River, near a place known as Maryland Point (later to be the site of the Maryland Point Light). On returning to England in 1658 Lee bought land in Stratford, and in 1662 was recorded as owning a large house there. However, retired history professor Ged Martin has questioned the American name-origin theory, finding limited documentary support for the story, and noting that Lee's interests were far more associated with Virginia than Maryland.
- Professor Martin has put forward an explanation that the name has an etymology related to similar names in the region and derives from Old English words for a boundary, cognate to the Anglo-Saxon words maere and mearc.

With the growth of Stratford in the mid-19th century the vicinity was built up as Stratford New Town, and Maryland gained a prosperous shopping thoroughfare. Maryland station opened in 1874.

By 2021, the population and distinctiveness of the area was sufficient for it to be recognised for the first time as an electoral ward in Newham, with the first two councillors for Maryland elected in 2022.

== Notable people ==
- 'The Birthplace of Iron Maiden', Cart & Horses, 1 Maryland Point
- Charles Edmund Clutterbuck (1806–1861), stained glass artist
- Charles Hitchcock, grandfather to Alfred Hitchcock, had a fishmongery business at 20 Leytonstone Road
- Dorothy Kilner (1755–1836), children's writer
- Anna Kingsford (1846–1888), anti-vivisectionist, theosophist, suffragette and campaigner for women's rights, née Bonus, was born at Maryland Point
- Edward Killingworth Johnson (1825-1896), wood engraver, illustrator and watercolour artist, born at Maryland Point

== Transport ==
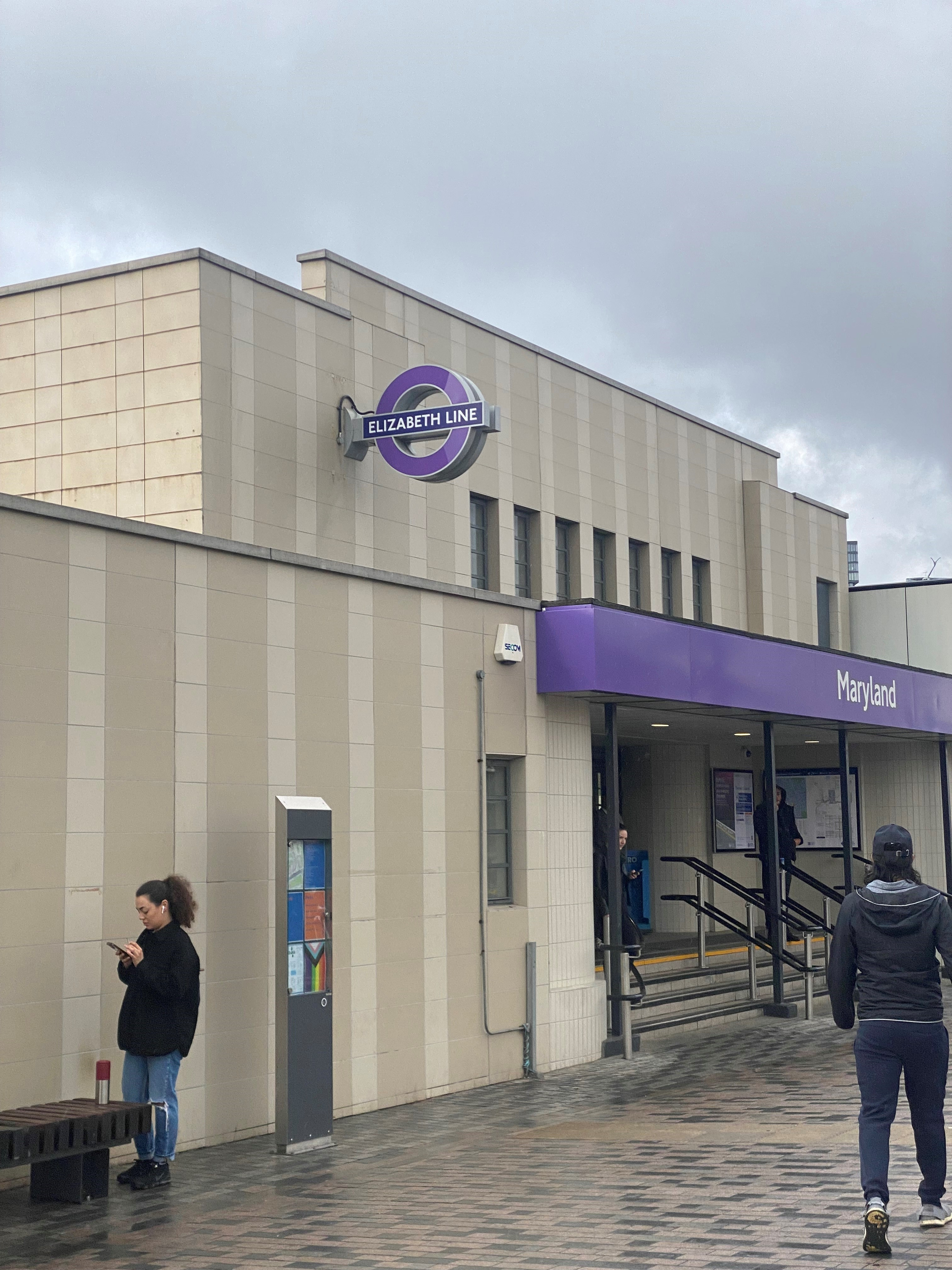
Maryland station

- Maryland station is served by Elizabeth line trains, with a frequency of five minutes in each direction. Trains towards central London run a stopping service terminating at London Paddington and Heathrow Airport. To the east, trains run a stopping service terminating at Shenfield.
- Maryland is served by bus routes 69, 257, 308 and night bus N8.

== Education ==
Local primary schools include Maryland Primary School, St. Francis' Catholic Primary School, and Colegrave Primary School.
