= She (1911 film) =

1911 film by George Nichols

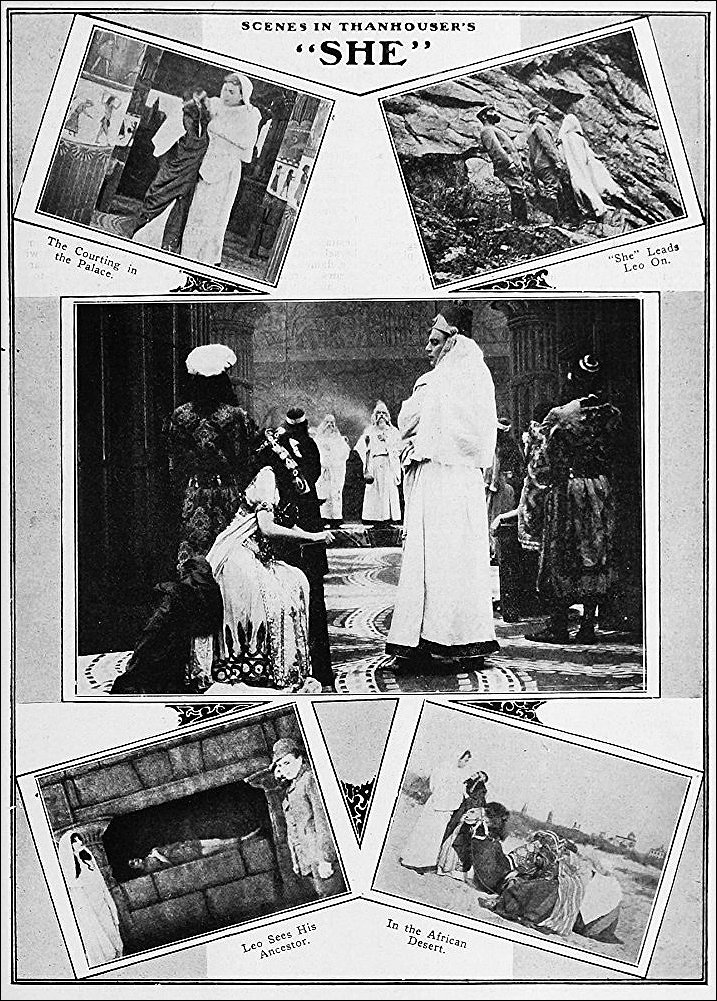
- Compilation poster
- Directed by: George Nichols
- Written by: Theodore Marston
- Based on: She: A History of Adventure; 1887 novel by H. Rider Haggard
- Starring: Marguerite Snow
- Production company: Thanhouser Film Corporation
- Distributed by: Motion Picture Distributors and Sales Company
- Release date: December 26, 1911
- Running time: 24 minutes
- Country: United States
- Language: silent film

She is a 1911 American fantasy silent film and is the fourth film to attempt to portray the story in the 1887 novel of the same name by H. Rider Haggard. Made by the Thanhouser Company, the film was directed by George Nichols and featured his wife Viola Alberti as Amenartes. It starred Marguerite Snow in the title role and James Cruze in the joint role of Kallikrates and Leo Vincey and was based on a scenario by Theodore Marston.

== Synopsis ==
She (1911)

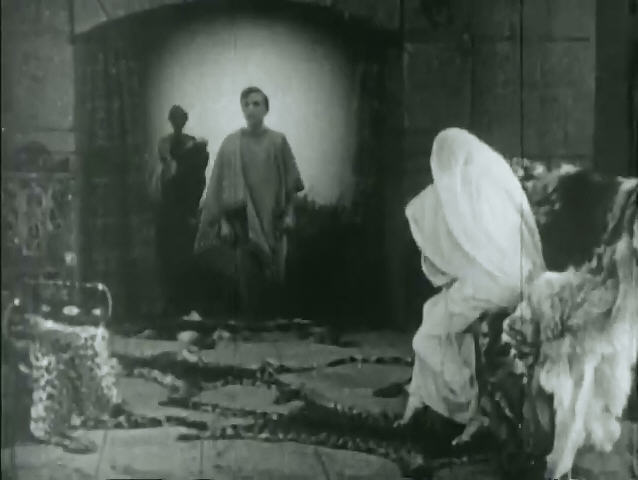
'She' has a vision of the approach of Kallikrates

The film opens in an outer court of a temple in ancient Egypt in the year 350 B.C. Here Amenartas, the Pharaoh's daughter (Viola Alberti) awaits her love, Kallikrates (James Cruze), who has just become a Priest of Isis. She begs him to leave the priesthood and flee with her from Egypt. Eventually he can resist her entreaties no longer and they escape from the temple. In the desert they meet friendly Arabs who give the weak Kallikrates a camel on which to travel.

After journeying for "twice twelve moons" they land with their infant son on the East coast of Africa at a point called the Negro's Head. Here lives "She Who Must Be Obeyed" (Marguerite Snow), the white witch of Africa, who has learned the secret of eternal youth. With her mystic power "She" sees Kallikrates approach and realises he is the perfect man who must join her by bathing in the fires of eternal youth and with her rule the world. "She" takes Amenartas and Kallikrates to the mystic flame but when Kallikrates spurns her love "She" strikes him down dead. Amenartas flees to safety with her infant son, vowing that one day her son or his descendants will return to avenge her husband's death. The body of her dead love is preserved through the generations by "She", who patiently awaits the return of his reincarnation.

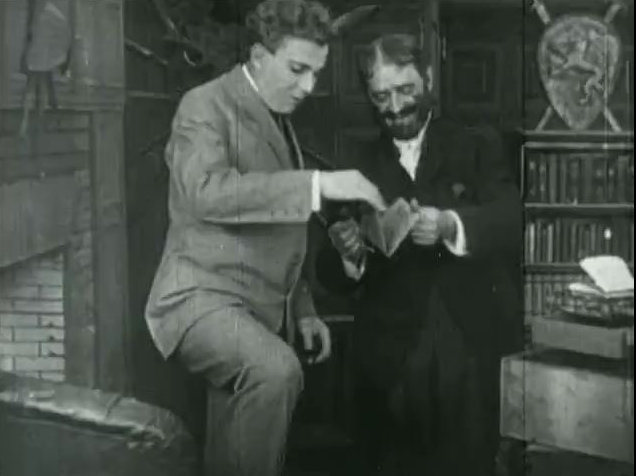
Leo Vincey (James Cruze) and Horace Holly (William C. Cooper) open the chart in She

Centuries later, in 1885, while "She Who Never Dies" continues to grieve for her lost love, Horace Holly (William C. Cooper) becomes the guardian of the young English boy Leo Vincey (Marie Eline) on the death of the boy's father. Leo is the descendant of Kallikrates. With the boy comes a mysterious chest and a letter saying the trunk must not be opened before Leo's 25th birthday.

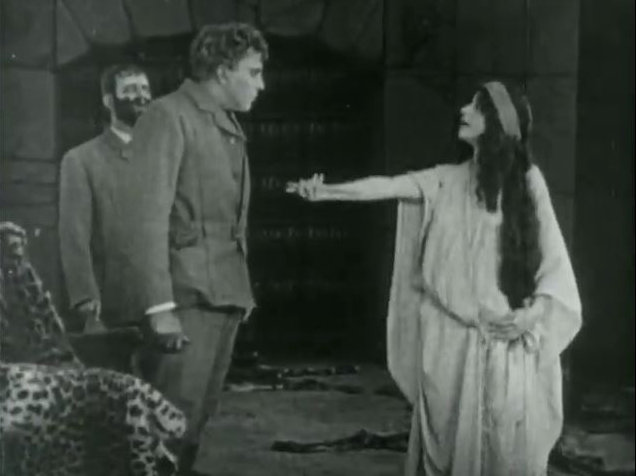
'She' (Marguerite Snow) offers the dagger to Leo Vincey (James Cruze)

In 1910 Leo Vincey (James Cruze) is now 25. He and Holly open the chest to discover a letter and a chart; the former entreat them to avenge the death of Kallikrates while the chart shows them the way. The two travel to the East coast of Africa where they see a strange rock, the Negro's Head. "She" sees Leo approach in a vision; so alike is he to Kallikrates that she believes him to be the reincarnation of her dead love. Leo's boat is stopped by a tribe of natives who blindfold him and Holly lead them into the presence of "She”- who welcomes Leo as her lost love. However, Leo tells "She" he has come to end her life in revenge for the death of his ancestor. "She" gives him a knife and baring her bosom bids him to strike, but blinded by her beauty he is unable to do so . After leading Leo and Holly through passageways cut deep into the rock "She" reveals to Leo the perfectly preserved mummy of Kallikrates. So alike is it to Leo that he believes it actually is himself. "She" destroys the mummy as she believes she has found her living love.

Leading Leo and Holly to the cave which contains the Pillar of Fire that has given her youth for 2,000 years, "She" entreats Leo to step into the flame so that he too will receive eternal youth and live with her forever. As Leo hesitates “She” steps into the flames to calm his fears. However, in the many centuries since “She” last stepped into them the nature of the flames has changed and she instantly grows old, until she shrivels into an ape-like creature. Reaching out to Leo and begging him to remember her "She" dies. Driven nearly mad by what they have just seen, Holly and Leo make their way back to the village. Leaving the strange land they return to England where Leo's golden hair turns white with the shock of all he has seen. As he destroys all record of "She” he knows the honour of his ancient ancestor has been avenged.

== Cast ==
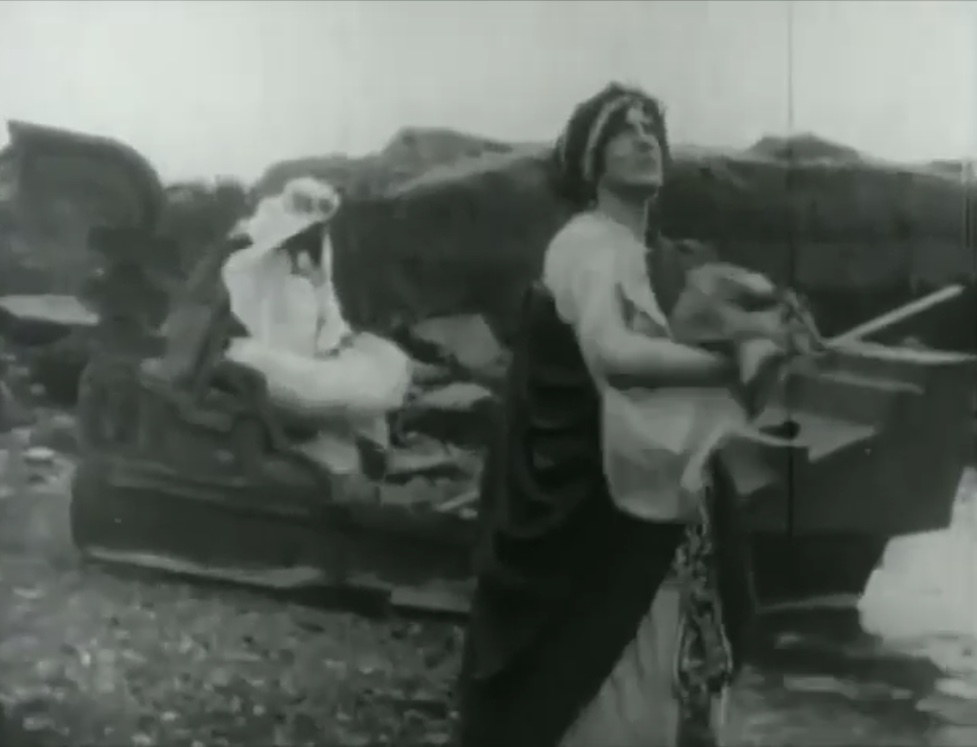
Viola Alberti as Amenartes

- "She" - Marguerite Snow
- Leo Vincey / Kallikrates - James Cruze
- Leo Vincey as a youth - Marie Eline
- Amenartes, the Pharaoh's daughter - Viola Alberti
- Horace Holly - William C. Cooper
- Ustane - Irma Taylor
- Billali - Harry Benham
- Job - Alphonse Ethier

== Production ==
She was the first attempt in film to depict the story in H. Rider Haggard's 1887 novel She: A History of Adventure; an earlier film, The Pillar of Fire (1899) by Georges Méliès, was a short silent trick film in which the central character Ayesha stands amid flames. In the 1911 film only the main scenes from the novel are depicted with intertitles serving to explain the forthcoming scene; one states that "She" strikes down and kills Leo Vincey but the actors do not depict this. The "dialogue" is accompanied by dramatic gesticulation from the actors while the character of Ustane is barely recognisable.

Running at 24 minutes 40 seconds and released on 26 December 1911, She was Thanhouser's first two-reel production. Made quickly in a week, probably in November 1911, the film marked Thanhouser's attempt to depict the epic romance of H. Rider Haggard's tale of love across the centuries. Made on a low budget (the characters arrive off the African coast in a row boat!) the film was made with only a dozen or so actors and extras and cheaply painted scenery. Despite the claim that "The Thanhouser picture of She was made in several different locations, some of them requiring the company to travel 500 miles" in reality a few icy November coastal locations in upstate New York, including Long Island Sound, stand in for the East African coast; and while the production boasts a real camel in the desert scenes the buildings in the distance are clearly not African. In the tomb scene in Part II where James Cruze as Leo Vincey looks upon the dead body of himself as Kallikrates, double exposure photography was used. In the scene where "She" shrinks into the small mis-shapen creature a child or dwarf was used in make-up.
