= She: A History of Adventure =

1887 novel by H. Rider Haggard

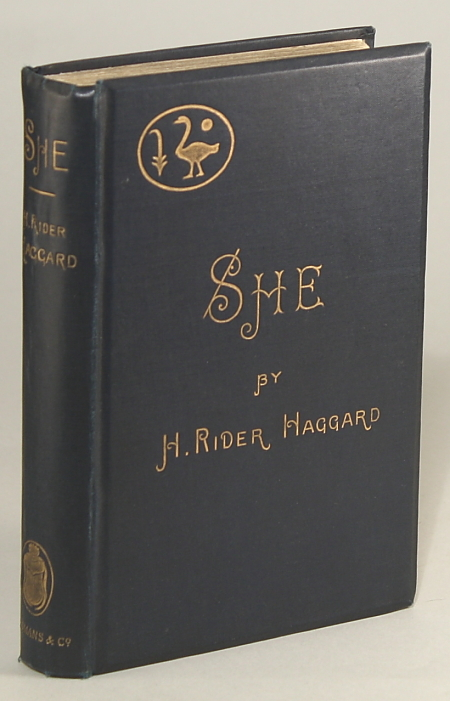
- Cover of the first edition (1887)
- Author: H. Rider Haggard
- Illustrator: E. K. Johnson (Graphic); Maurice Greiffenhagen & C. H. M. Kerr (1888 ed)
- Language: English
- Series: Ayesha series
- Genre: Fantasy, adventure, romance, Gothic
- Set in: Cambridge and East Africa (Zanzibar), 1860s–80s
- Publisher: Longmans
- Publication date: 1887
- Publication place: United Kingdom
- Media type: Print (serial, hardback, paperback)
- Pages: 317 (1887 hardback)
- Dewey Decimal: 823.8
- LC Class: PR4731 .S6
- Preceded by: King Solomon's Mines
- Followed by: The Ancient Allan
- Text: She: A History of Adventure at Wikisource

She: A History of Adventure is a Gothic novel by the English writer H. Rider Haggard, published in book form in 1887 following serialisation in The Graphic magazine between October 1886 and January 1887. She was extraordinarily popular upon its release and has never been out of print.

The story is a first-person narrative which follows the journey of Horace Holly and his ward Leo Vincey to a lost kingdom in the African interior. They encounter a native people led by a mysterious white queen named Ayesha (pronounced "Assha") who reigns as the all-powerful Hiya — in English, She-who-must-be-obeyed, or She.

Haggard developed many conventions of the lost world genre which countless authors have since emulated. His works represent part of a broader literary revival of chivalric romance and adventure stories, in contrast to domestic realism. Other writers following this trend were Robert Louis Stevenson, George MacDonald, and William Morris. Haggard was inspired by his experiences living in South Africa for seven years (1875–1882) working at the highest levels of the British colonial administration.

In the figure of She, the novel explored themes of female authority and feminine behaviour. Its archetypal representation of womanhood has received both praise and criticism.

== Plot ==
Horace Holly, a young Cambridge University professor, is visited by Vincey, a colleague who is convinced that he will soon die. Vincey charges Holly with the task of raising his young son, Leo. He gives Holly a locked iron box, with instructions that it is not to be opened until Leo's 25th birthday. Holly agrees. Vincey is found dead the next day, and Holly raises the boy as his own. When the box is opened they discover the ancient "Sherd of Amenartas". The Sherd describes an ancient love triangle between Amenartas, She, and Kallikrates. She kills Kallikrates, and Amenartas charges her son with revenge. The son attempted the task without success, and passed the quest on to his son, who also failed. So did the quest pass through the generations, until Vincey passed it to Leo.

Although Holly disbelieves the story, Leo decides to investigate. The two, along with their servant, Job, follow instructions on the Sherd and travel to eastern Africa. After surviving a shipwreck, they and their Arab captain, Mahomed, journey into the African interior where they are captured by the savage Amahagger people. The adventurers learn that the natives are ruled by a fearsome white queen who is worshipped as Hiya or "She-who-must-be-obeyed". Billali, chief of one of the Amahagger tribes, takes charge of the three men, introducing them to the ways of his people. One of the Amahagger maidens, Ustane, takes a liking to Leo and, by kissing him and embracing him publicly, weds him according to Amahagger custom. Leo, likewise, grows very fond of her.

Billali leaves to report the white men's arrival to the queen. In his absence, some of the Amahagger become restless and attempt to eat Mahomed as part of a ritual "hot pot". Holly shoots and kills several of the Amahagger, accidentally killing Mahomed in the process. Leo is gravely wounded in the ensuing struggle, and Ustane saves his life by throwing herself onto his prostrate body. Billali returns and declares that the three men are under the queen's protection. Ustane faithfully attends to Leo, but his condition worsens, especially when the queen summons them and they are forced to traverse the swamps linking the kingdom.

The men are taken to the home of the queen near the ruins of the lost city of Kôr, a once-mighty civilisation that predated the Egyptians. In a series of catacombs originally built as tombs, Holly is presented to the queen, a white sorceress named Ayesha whose beauty is so great that it enchants any man who beholds it. Ayesha, veiled and behind a partition, warns Holly that the power of her splendour arouses both desire and fear. When she shows herself, Holly is enraptured and prostrates himself before her. Ayesha reveals that she has learned the secret of immortality and that she possesses other supernatural powers including the ability to read the minds of others, as well as healing wounds and curing illness, but she is unable to see into the future. She tells Holly that she has lived in Kôr for more than two millennia, awaiting the reincarnated return of her lover, Kallikrates (whom she had slain in a fit of jealous rage).

The next evening Ayesha visits Leo, intending to heal him. Upon seeing his face, she declares him to be the reincarnation of Kallikrates. Ayesha orders Ustane to leave and never set eyes on Leo again. When Ustane refuses, Ayesha strikes her dead with magic. Leo becomes bewitched, and despite the murder of Ustane, neither Holly nor Leo can free themselves from Ayesha's power. Ayesha shows Leo the perfectly preserved body of Kallikrates, which she has kept with her, and then dissolves the remains with a powerful acid, confident that Leo is indeed the reincarnation of her former lover.

Ayesha takes the men to see the Pillar of Fire, the source of her immortality and power. She is determined that Leo should bathe in the fire to become immortal and remain with her forever. Arriving at the great cavern, Leo doubts the safety of entering the fire, whereupon Ayesha herself steps into the flame. This second immersion nullifies her immortality, and she begins to wither and revert to her true age. The sight is so shocking that Job dies of fright. Before dying, Ayesha tells Leo, "Forget me not. I shall come again!" Holly and Leo then depart from Kôr and eventually return to their home in Cambridge.

== Characters ==
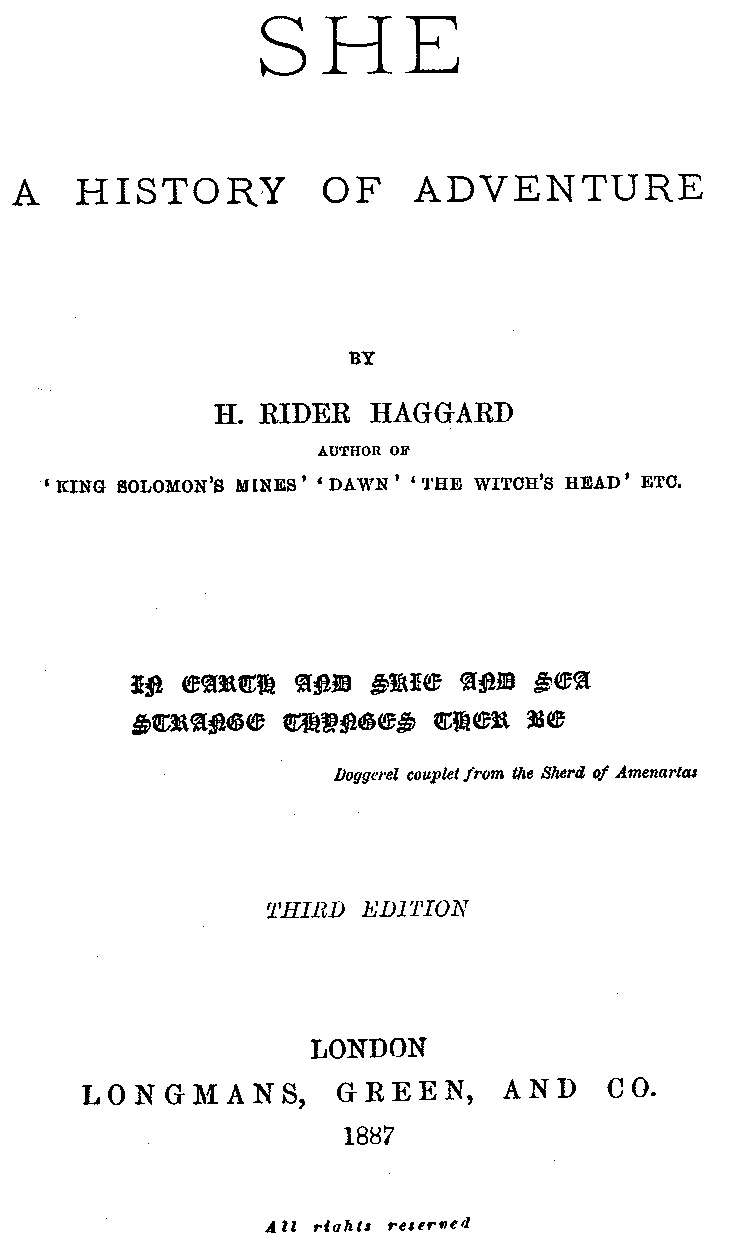
Title page of third edition

- Horace Holly – protagonist and narrator, Holly is a Cambridge man whose keen intellect and knowledge were developed to compensate for his ape-like appearance. Holly knows a number of ancient languages, including Greek, Arabic, and Hebrew, which allow him to communicate with the Amahagger (who speak a form of Arabic) and She (who knows all three languages). Holly's interest in archaeology and the origins of civilisation lead him to explore the ruins of Kôr.
- Leo Vincey – ward of Horace Holly, Leo is a handsome, physically active young English gentleman with a head of thick blond hair. He is the confidant of Holly and befriends Ustane. According to She, Leo resembles Kallikrates in appearance and is his reincarnation.
- Ayesha of Kor – the title character of the novel, called Hiya by the native Amahagger, or "She" (She-who-must-be-obeyed). Ayesha was born over 2,000 years ago amongst the Arabs, mastering the lore of the ancients and becoming a great sorceress. Learning of the Pillar of Life in the African interior, she journeyed to the ruined kingdom of Kôr, feigning friendship with a hermit who was the keeper of the Flame that granted immortality. She bathed in the Pillar of Life's fire. Her name Ayesha is of Arabic origin and, according to the author, should be pronounced "Assha".
- Job – Holly's trusted servant. Job is a working-class man and highly suspicious and judgmental of non-English peoples. He is also a devout Protestant. Of all the travellers, he is especially disgusted by the Amahagger and fearful of She.
- Billali – an aged elder of one of the Amahagger tribes, who develops a paternal bond with Holly that proves instrumental in the escape from the Amahagger by both Holly and Leo.
- Ustane – an Amahagger maiden. She becomes romantically attached to Leo, caring for him when he is injured, acting as his protector, and defying She to stay with him.
- Kallikrates – an ancient Greek, the husband of Amenartas, and ancestor of Leo. Two thousand years ago, he and Amenartas fled Egypt, seeking a haven in the African interior where they met Ayesha. There, She fell in love with him, promising to give him the secret of immortality if he would kill Amenartas. He refused, and, enraged, She struck him down.
- Amenartas – an ancient Egyptian priestess and ancestress of the Vincey family. As a priestess of Isis, she was protected from the power of She. When Ayesha slew Kallikrates, she expelled Amenartas from her realm. Amenartas gave birth to Kallikrates's son, beginning the line of the Vinceys, Leo's ancestors.

== Background ==
=== South Africa ===
In 1875, Haggard was sent to Cape Town, South Africa as secretary to Sir Henry Bulwer, the lieutenant-governor of Natal. Haggard wrote in his memoirs of his aspirations to become a colonial governor himself, and of his youthful excitement at the prospects. The major event during his time in Africa was Britain's annexation of the Transvaal in 1877. Haggard was part of the expedition that established British control over the Boer republic, and which helped raise the Union flag over the capital of Pretoria on 24 May 1877. Writing of the moment, Haggard declared:

It will be some years before people at home realise how great an act it has been, an act without parallel. I am very proud of having been connected with it. Twenty years hence it will be a great thing to have hoisted the Union Jack over the Transvaal for the first time.

Haggard had advocated the British annexation of the Boer republic in a journal article entitled "The Transvaal", published in the May 1877 issue of Macmillan's Magazine. He maintained that it was Britain's "mission to conquer and hold in subjection, not from thirst of conquest but for the sake of law, justice, and order". However, Boer resistance to annexation and the resulting Anglo-Zulu War caused the government in London to withdraw from pursuing sovereignty over the South African interior. Haggard considered this to be a "great betrayal" by Prime Minister Gladstone and the Liberal Party, which "no lapse of time ever can solace or even alleviate". He became increasingly disillusioned with the realities of colonial Africa. Victorian scholar Patrick Brantlinger notes in his introduction to She: "Little that Haggard witnessed matched the romantic depictions of 'the dark continent' in boys' adventure novels, in the press, and even in such bestselling explorers' journals as David Livingstone's Missionary Travels and Researches in South Africa (1857)."

During his time in South Africa, Haggard developed an intense hatred for the Boers, but also came to admire the Zulus. However, his admiration of the Zulus did not extend to other African peoples; rather, he shared many of the assumptions that underlay contemporary politics and philosophy, such as those expressed by James Hunt, the President of the Anthropological Society of London: "the Negro is inferior intellectually to the European...[and] can only be humanised and civilised by Europeans. The analogies are far more numerous between the Negro and apes, than between the European and apes." The Victorian belief in the inherent inferiority of the 'darker races' made them the object of a civilising impulse in the European Scramble for Africa. Although disenchanted with the colonial effort, Haggard remained committed to this ideology. He believed that the British "alone of all the nations in the world appear to be able to control coloured races without the exercise of cruelty".

=== Return to Britain ===
Rider Haggard after his return to England in 1881

Rider Haggard returned to Britain in 1881. At the time, England was increasingly beset by the social and cultural anxieties that marked the fin de siècle. One of the most prominent concerns was the fear of political and racial decline, encapsulated in Max Nordau's Degeneration (1895). Barely half a century earlier, Thomas Babington Macaulay had declared "the history of England" to be "emphatically the history of progress", but late-Victorians living in the wake of Darwinian evolutionary theory had lost the earlier positivism of their age. Uncertainty over the immutability of Britain's historical identity, what historian Tim Murray has called the "threat of the past", was manifested in the Victorian obsession with ancient times and archaeology. Haggard was greatly interested in the ruins discovered at Zimbabwe in the 1870s. In 1896, he provided the preface to a monograph that detailed a history of the site, declaring:

What was the condition of this so-called empire, and what the measure of the effective dignity of its emperor, are points rather difficult to determine... now, after the lapse of two centuries... it is legitimate to hope, it seems probable even, that in centuries to come a town will once more nestle beneath these grey and ancient ruins, trading in gold as did that of the Phoenicians, but peopled by men of the Anglo-Saxon race.

By the time that Haggard began writing She, society had more anxiety about the role of women. Debates regarding "The Woman Question" dominated Britain during the fin de siècle, as well as anxieties over the increasing position and independence of the "New Woman". Alarm over social degeneracy and decadence further fanned concerns over the women's movement and female liberation, which challenged the traditional conception of Victorian womanhood. The role and rights of women had changed dramatically since the early part of the century, as they entered the workforce, received better education, and gained more political and legal independence. Writing in 1894, Haggard believed that marriage was the natural state for women: "Notwithstanding the energetic repudiations of the fact that confront us at every turn, it may be taken for granted that in most cases it is the natural mission of women to marry; that – always in most cases – if they do not marry they become narrowed, live a half life only, and suffer in health of body and of mind." He created the character of She-who-must-be-obeyed "who provided a touchstone for many of the anxieties surrounding the New Woman in late-Victorian England".

== Concept and creation ==
=== Influences ===
According to Haggard's daughter Lilias, the phrase "She-who-must-be-obeyed" originated from his childhood and "the particularly hideous aspect" of one rag-doll: "This doll was something of a fetish, and Rider, as a small child, was terrified of her, a fact soon discovered by an unscrupulous nurse who made full use of it to frighten him into obedience. Why or how it came to be called She-Who-Must-Be-Obeyed he could not remember." Haggard wrote that "the title She" was taken "from a certain rag doll, so named, which a nurse at Bradenham used to bring out of some dark recess in order to terrify those of my brothers and sisters who were in her charge."

Scholars have identified a number of analogues to She in earlier literature. According to Brantlinger, Haggard certainly read the stories of Edward Bulwer-Lytton, in particular A Strange Story (1862), which includes a mysterious veiled woman called "Ayesha", and The Coming Race (1871), which is about the discovery of a subterranean civilisation. Similarly, the name of the underground civilisation in She, known as Kôr, is derived from Norse mythological romance, where the deathbed of the goddess Hel is called Kör, which means "disease" in Old Norse.

Various traditions of female monarchy on the African continent were also precursors. A reference to one such influence on She appears in Lieutenant George Witton's 1907 book Scapegoats of the Empire; The True Story of the Bushveldt Carbineers:

By midday we reached the Letaba Valley, in the Majajes Mountains, inhabited by a powerful tribe of natives once ruled by a princess said to be the prototype of Rider Haggard's "She".

=== Composition ===
In his autobiography, Haggard writes that he composed She in six weeks in February and March 1886, having just completed Jess, which was published in 1887. Haggard claimed that this was an intensely creative period: the text "was never rewritten, and the manuscript carries but few corrections". Haggard went on to declare: "The fact is that it was written at white heat, almost without rest, and that is the best way to compose." He admitted to having had no clear story in mind when he began writing:

I remember that when I sat down to the task my ideas as to its development were of the vaguest. The only clear notion that I had in my head was that of an immortal woman inspired by an immortal love. All the rest shaped itself round this figure. And it came – it came faster than my poor aching hand could set it down.

According to Haggard, he wrote the final scene of Ayesha's demise while waiting for his literary agent, A. P. Watt, to return to his office. In his telling, once he had completed the scene, he threw the manuscript on Watt's desk and declared, "There is what I shall be remembered by".

=== Publication ===
She was first published as a serial story in The Graphic, a large folio magazine printed weekly in London, between October 1886 and January 1887. The serialisation was accompanied with illustrations by E. K. Johnson. An American edition was published by Harper & Bros. in New York on 24 December 1886; this included Johnson's illustrations. On 1 January 1887 a British edition was published by Longmans, Green, & Co., without any illustrations. It featured significant textual revisions by Haggard. He made further revisions for the British edition of 1888, which included new illustrations by Maurice Greiffenhagen and C. H. M. Kerr. In 2006 Broadview published the first edition of She since 1887 to reproduce the Graphic serial text.

=== Narrative revisions ===
Rider Haggard's recreation of the Sherd of Amenartas, now in the collection of the Norwich Castle Museum

Haggard contended that romances such as She or King Solomon's Mines were best left unrevised because "wine of this character loses its bouquet when it is poured from glass to glass". However, he made a number of alterations to the Graphic version of She before its publication as a novel in 1887. One of the most significant was to the third chapter concerning the sherd, which was substantially expanded from the original to include the tale of Amenartas in uncial and cursive Greek scripts. Facsimile illustrations were also included of an antique vase, made up by Haggard's sister-in-law Agnes Barber to resemble the sherd of Amenartas. A number of footnotes were also included containing historical references by the narrator. Haggard was keen to stress the historicity of the narrative, improving some of the information about geography and about ancient civilisations in Chapters 4, 13, and 17.

The 1887 edition of the novel also features a substantially rewritten version of the "hotpot" scene in Chapter 8, when Mahomed is killed. In the original serialisation the cannibal Amahagger grow restless and hungry, and place a large heated pot over Mahomed's head, enacting the hotpotting ritual before eating him. Haggard's stories were criticised at the time for their violence, and he toned this scene down, so that Mahomed dies when Holly shoots him accidentally in the scuffle with the Amahagger. Comparing the serial and novel editions of She, Stauffer describes the more compact narrative of the original as a reflection of the intense burst of creativity in which Haggard composed the story, arguing that "the style and grammar of the Graphic [edition] is more energetic and immediate", although, as he noted, it is also "sometimes more flawed".

Haggard continued to revise She for later editions. The "New Edition" of 1888 contains more than 400 minor alterations. The last revision by Haggard was in 1896.

== Genre ==
=== Fantasy and science fiction ===
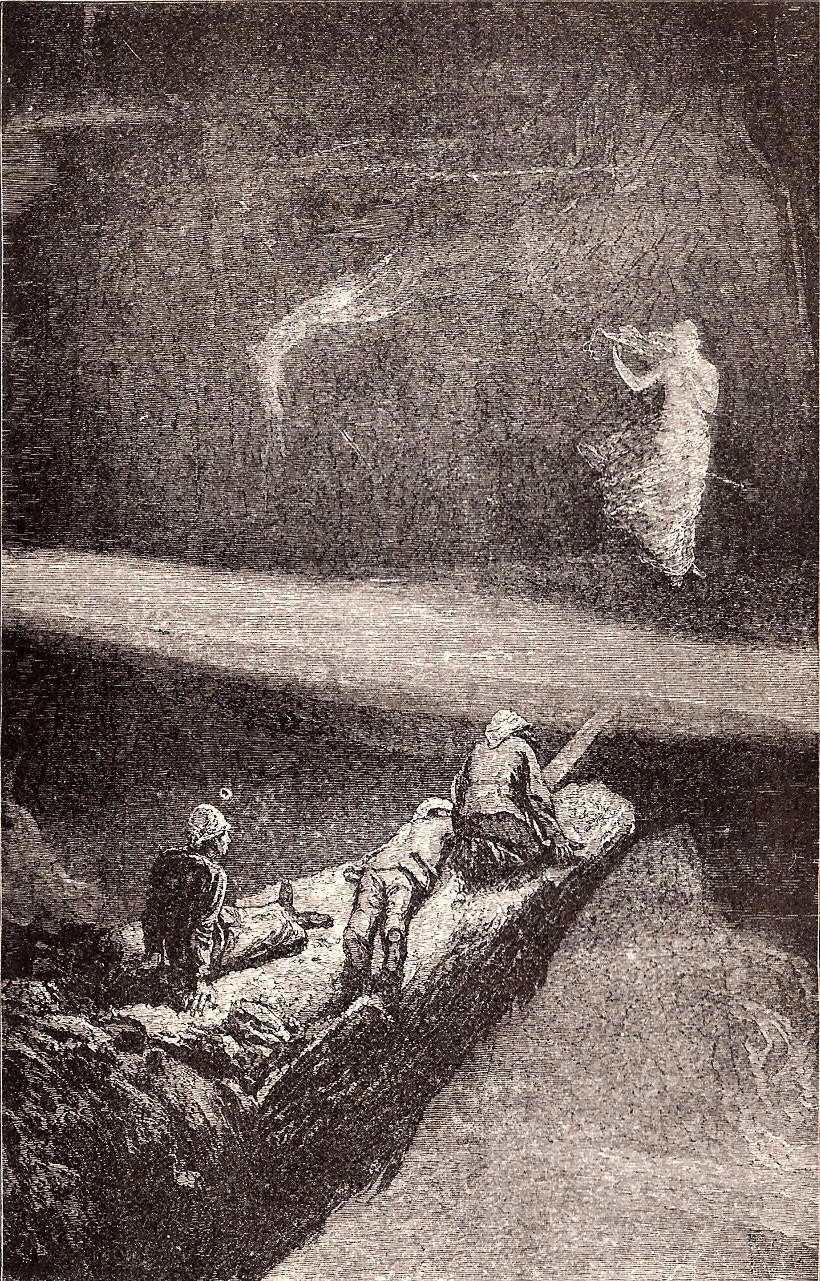
Illustration in The Graphic (1887) by E. K. Johnson. Journey to the Spirit of Life; Ayesha, having crossed the ravine, beckons Holly, Leo, and Job to follow her using the wooden plank. A shaft of light divides the darkness about them. She contains various fantasy, adventure, and Gothic genre conventions.

She is one of the foundational works of fantasy literature, coming around the time of The Princess and the Goblin (1858) by George MacDonald, William Morris' The Wood Beyond the World and The Well at the World's End, and the short stories of Lord Dunsany. It is marked by a strong element of "the marvelous" in the figure of Ayesha, a two-thousand-year-old sorceress, and the 'Spirit of the World', an undying fire that confers immortality. Indeed, Haggard's story is one of the first in modern literature to feature "a slight intrusion of something unreal" into a very real world – a hallmark of the fantasy genre. Similarly, the carefully constructed "fantasy history" of She foreshadows the use of this technique that characterises later fantasies such as The Lord of the Rings and The Wheel of Time series, and which imparts a "degree of security" to the secondary world. However, the story of She is firmly ensconced in what fantasy theorists call 'primary world reality', with the lost kingdom of Kôr, the realm ruled by the supernatural She, a fantastic "Tertiary World" at once directly part of and at the same time indirectly set apart from normative "primary" reality. Along with Haggard's prior novel, King Solomon's Mines, She laid the blueprints for the "lost world" subgenre in fantasy literature, as well as the convention of the "lost race". As Brantlinger has noted of the novel's importance to the development of the "secondary world" in fantasy literature: "Haggard may seem peripheral to the development of science fiction, and yet his African quest romances could easily be transposed to other planets and galaxies". In his history of science fiction, Billion Year Spree, Brian Aldiss notes the frequency with which Ayesha's death in the Pillar of Fire has been imitated by later science fiction and fantasy writers: "From Haggard on, crumbling women, priestesses, or empresses – all symbols of women as Untouchable and Unmakeable – fill the pages of many a scientific romance".

=== Adventure romance ===
She is part of the adventure subgenre of literature which was especially popular at the end of the 19th century, but which remains an important form of fiction to the present day. Along with works such as Treasure Island (1883) and Prince Otto (1885) by Robert Louis Stevenson, and Jules Verne's A Journey to the Center of the Earth (1871) and Around the World in Eighty Days (1875), She had an important formative effect on the development of the adventure novel. Indeed, Rider Haggard is credited with inventing the romance of archaeological exploration which began in King Solomon's Mines and crystallised in She. One of the most notable modern forms of this genre is the Indiana Jones movie series, as well as the Tarzan novels by Edgar Rice Burroughs and Alan Moore's The League of Extraordinary Gentlemen (2000). In such fictional narratives, the explorer is the hero, with the drama unfolding as they are cast into "the nostrum of the living past".

=== Imperial Gothic ===
She is also one of the central texts in the development of Imperial Gothic. Many late-Victorian authors during the fin de siècle employed Gothic conventions and motifs in their writing, stressing and alluding to the supernatural, the ghostly, and the demonic. As Brantlinger has noted, "Connected to imperialist adventure fiction, these interests often imply anxieties about the stability of Britain, of the British Empire, or, more generally, of Western civilisation". Novels like Dracula and Strange Case of Dr Jekyll and Mr Hyde present depictions of repressed, foreign, and demonic forces at the heart of the imperial polity. In She the danger is raised in the form of Ayesha herself:

The terrible She had evidently made up her mind to go to England, and it made me absolutely shudder to think what would be the result of her arrival there... In the end she would, I had little doubt, assume absolute rule over the British dominions, and probably over the whole earth, and, though I was sure that she would speedily make ours the most glorious and prosperous empire that the world had ever seen, it would be at the cost of a terrible sacrifice of life.

She's threat to replace Queen Victoria with herself echoes the underlying anxiety over European colonialism emblematic of the Imperial Gothic genre. Indeed, Judith Wilt characterises the narrative of She, in which the penetration into Africa (represented by Holly, Leo, and Job) suddenly suffers a potential "counter-attack" (from Ayesha), as one of the archetypal illustrations of the "reverse colonialism" motif in Victorian Gothic. Similarly, She marks one of the first fictional examples to raise the spectre of the natural decline of civilisation, and by extension, British imperial power, which would become an increasingly frequent theme in Gothic and invasion literature until the onset of World War I.

== Style ==
Rider Haggard's writing style was much criticised in reviews of She and his other works. His harshest critic was Augustus Moore, who wrote: "God help English literature when English people lay aside their Waverley novels, and the works of Defoe, Swift, Thackeray, Charlotte Brontë, George Eliot, and even Charles Reade, for the penny dreadfuls of Mr Haggard." He added: "The man who could write 'he spoke to She' can have no ear at all." A more common sentiment was expressed in the anonymous review of She in Blackwood's Edinburgh Magazine: "Mr Rider Haggard is not an exquisite workman like Mr [Robert Louis] Stevenson, but he has a great deal of power in his way, and rougher qualities which are more likely, perhaps, to 'take the town' than skill more delicate."

Modern literary criticism has tended to be more circumspect. As Daniel Karlin has noted, "That Haggard's style is frequently bathetic or clumsy cannot be denied; but the matter is not so easily settled." Stauffer cites the passage in which Holly meditates as he tries to fall asleep as emblematic of "the charges against" Haggard's writing. In this scene Holly lies down and

Above me ... shone the eternal stars. ... Oh that we should shake loose the prisoned pinions of the soul and soar to that superior point, whence, like to some traveller looking out through space from Darien's giddiest peak, we might gaze with the spiritual eyes of noble thoughts deep into Infinity! What would it be to cast off this earthly robe, to have done for ever with these earthly thoughts and miserable desires. ... Yes, to cast them off, to have done with the foul and thorny places of the world; and like those glittering points above me, to rest on high wrapped forever in the brightness of our better selves, that even now shines in us as fire faintly shines within those lurid balls ...

The passage concludes with a wry remark from Holly: "I at last managed to get to sleep, a fact for which anybody who reads this narrative, if anybody ever does, may very probably be thankful." According to Stauffer, "the disarming deflation of the passage goes a long way toward redeeming it, and is typical of the winning contradictions of the narrator's style". Tom Pocock in Rider Haggard and the Lost Empire has also highlighted the "literary framework" that Haggard constructs throughout much of the narrative, referencing Keats, Shakespeare and Classical literature to imbue the story with a "Gothic sensibility". Yet as Stauffer notes, "Ultimately, however, one thinks of Haggard's plots, episodes, and images as the source of his lasting reputation and influence."

== Themes ==
=== Imperialism ===
She is set firmly in the imperialist literature of the late-Victorian period. The so-called "New Imperialism" marking the last quarter of the 19th century witnessed a further expansion of European colonies, particularly on the African continent, and was characterised by a seeming confidence in the merits of empire and European civilisation. Thus She "invokes a particularly British view of the world" as Rider Haggard projects concepts of the English self against the foreign otherness of Africa. One example occurs when Holly is first ushered into the presence of Ayesha, walking into the chamber behind a grovelling Billali who warns Holly to follow his example, or "a surety she will blast thee where thou standest". She stresses quintessential British qualities through the "adventure" of empire, usually in contrast to foreign barbarism. The notion of imperialism is further compounded by the figure of She, who is herself a foreign colonising force. "In a sense then", Stauffer writes, "a single property line divides the realm of Queen Victoria and that of She-who-must-be-obeyed, two white queens who rule dark-skinned natives of the African continent."

=== Race and evolution ===
Like many of his Victorian contemporaries, Rider Haggard proceeded "on the assumption that whites are naturally superior to blacks, and that Britain's imperial extensions into Africa [were] a noble, civilising enterprise". Although Haggard wrote a number of novels that portray Africans in a comparatively realistic light, She is not among their number. Even in King Solomon's Mines, the representation of Umbopa (who was based on an actual warrior) and the Kukuanas drew upon Haggard's knowledge and understanding of the Zulus. In contrast, She makes no such distinctions. Ayesha, the English travellers and the ancient inhabitants of Kôr are all white embodiments of civilisation, while the darker Amahagger, as a people, illustrate notions of savagery, barbarity and superstition. Nonetheless, the "racial politics of the novel are more complex than they first appear", given that Ayesha is in origin an ancient Arabian; Leo is descended from, and physically resembles, a blond Hellenistic Greek; and Holly is said to resemble a baboon, an animal that Victorians typically associated with black Africans. Critics such as Wendy Katz, Patricia Murphy and Susan Gubar have discussed what they perceive as a strong racist undercurrent in She, but Andrew M. Stauffer takes note of the ways in which "the novel suggests deeper connections among the races, an ancient genealogy of ethnicities and civilizations in which every character is a hybrid".

There is a strong Social Darwinian pseudo-scientific undercurrent framing the representation of race in She, stemming from Haggard's own interests in evolutionary theory and archaeology. In particular, the theme of racial degeneration appears in the novel. Moving into the fin de siècle, late Victorians were increasingly concerned about cultural and national decline resulting from racial decay. In She, this evolutionary concept of degeneration through miscegenation is manifested in Ayesha and the Amahagger. Haggard represents the Amahagger as a debased mixture of ethnicities, "a curious mingling of races", originally descended from the inhabitants of Kôr but intermarried with Arabs and Africans. Racial hybridisation of any kind "entailed degeneration" to Victorians, a "decline from the pure blood" of the initial races, and thus "an aspect of their degeneration is the idea that the Amahagger have lost whatever elements of civilization their Kôr ancestors may have imparted to them". Ayesha proudly proclaims her own racial purity as a quality to be admired: "for Arabian am I by birth, even 'al Arab al Ariba' (an Arab of the Arabs), and of the race of our father Yárab, the son of Khâtan ... of the true Arab blood". However, Judith Wilt has argued that the novel's starkest evocation of the evolutionary principle occurs in the regressive demise of Ayesha. Stepping into the Pillar of Fire, the immortal She begins to wither and decay, undergoing what Wilt describes as the "ultimate Darwinian nightmare": evolution in reverse.

=== Female authority and sexuality ===
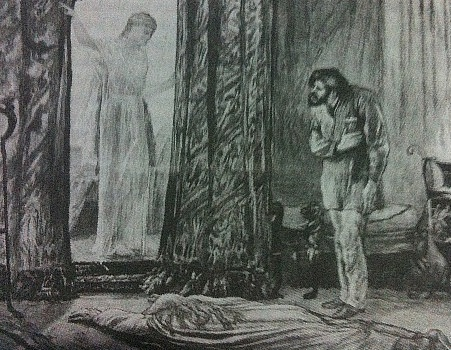
Illustration from the Graphic (1886). Holly first looks upon the figure of She, while Billali lies prostrate on the floor fearing to look up.

When Rider Haggard first conceived of She he began with the theme of "an immortal woman inspired by an immortal love". Although ostensibly a romance, the novel is part of the wider discourse regarding women and womanhood in late-Victorian Britain. Many scholars have noted how She was published as a book in 1887, the year of Queen Victoria's Golden Jubilee, and Adrienne Munich argues that Haggard's story "could fittingly be considered an ominous literary monument to Victoria after fifty years of her reign". Indeed, in her devotion to Kallikrates (two thousand years after his death), Ayesha echoes the long-lasting fidelity of Victoria to her husband, Albert. However, unlike the "benign" Victoria, the question of female authority is realised to the extreme in the figure of She-who-must-be-obeyed, whose autonomous will seemingly embodies Victorian anti-feminist fears of New Women desiring 'absolute personal independence coupled with supreme power over men'. Haggard constantly emphasises this anxiety over female authority in She, so that even the rationally minded and misogynistic Holly, who has put his "heart away from such vanity as woman's loveliness", ultimately falls upon his knees and worships Ayesha "as never woman was worshipped". Similarly, although the masculine and chivalric Leo is determined to reject Ayesha for killing the devoted native girl Ustane, he too quickly falls under her will.

In her role as the seductive femme fatale, Ayesha is part of "a long tradition of male fantasy that includes Homer's Circe, Shakespeare's Cleopatra, and Keats's 'La Belle Dame sans Merci'". Brantlinger identifies the theme of "the white (or at least light-skinned) queen ruling a black or brown-skinned savage race" as "a powerfully erotic one" with its opposite being "the image of the helpless white woman captured by savages and threatened, at least, with rape". The figure of She both inspires male desire and dominates male sovereignty, represented in her conquest of the 'enlightened' Victorians Holly and Leo. The two Englishmen embody the powers of manhood, with Leo a reflection of masculine physicality and Holly a representation of man's intellectual strength, but both are conquered by the feminine powers of She, who rules as much through sex-appeal as through sorcery, immortality, and will. Thus, Steven Arata describes her as "the veiled woman, that ubiquitous nineteenth-century figure of male desire and anxiety, whose body is Truth but a Truth that blasts". Similarly, Sarah Gilbert sees the theme of feminine sexuality and authority realised in Ayesha as critical to the novel's success: "Unlike the women earlier Victorian writers had idealised or excoriated, She was neither an angel nor a monster. Rather, She was an odd but significant blend of the two types – an angelically chaste woman with monstrous powers, a monstrously passionate woman with angelic charms".

== Reception ==
After its publication in 1887 She became an immediate success. According to The Literary World "Mr. Rider Haggard has made for himself a new field in fiction". Comparing the novel to King Solomon's Mines the review declared: "The book before us displays all the same qualities, and we anticipate for it a similar popularity. There is even more imagination in the later than in the earlier story; it contains scenes of greater sensuous beauty and also of more gruesome horror". The Public Opinion was equally rapturous in its praise:

Few books bolder in conception, more vigorous in treatment, or fresher in fancy, have appeared for a long time, and we are grateful to Mr. Haggard for carrying us on a pinion, swift and strong, far from the world of platitudinous dullness, on which most young writers embark, to a region limited only by his own vivid imagination, where the most inveterate reader of novels cannot guess what surprise awaits him.

The fantasy of She received particular acclaim from Victorian readers and critics. The review appearing in The Academy on 15 January was impressed by the "grown-up" vision of the novel, declaring "the more impossible it gets the better Mr. Haggard does it... his astonishing imagination, and a certain vraisemblance ["verisimilitude" (French)] makes the most impossible adventures appear true". This sentiment was echoed in The Queen: The Lady's Newspaper, with the reviewer pronouncing that "this is a tale in the hands of a writer not so able as Mr. Haggard might easily have become absurd; but he has treated it with so much vividness and picturesque power as to invest it with unflagging interest, and given to the mystery a port of philosophic possibility that makes us quite willing to submit to the illusion.

I must write to congratulate you upon a work which most certainly puts you at the head – a long away ahead – of all contemporary imaginative writers. If fiction is best cultivated in the field of pure invention then you are certainly the first of modern novelists.

— Sir Walter Besant

The Spectator was more equivocal in its appraisal of She. The review described the narrative as "very stirring" and "exciting" and of "remarkable imaginative power", adding: "The ingenuity of the story... is as subtle as ever romancer invented, and from the day when Leo and Holly land on the coast of Africa, to the day when the Pillar of Fire is revealed to them by the all but immortal 'She-who-must-be-obeyed', the interest of the tale rises higher and higher with every new turn in its course". However, the review took issue with the characterisation of She and the manner of her demise: "To the present writer there is a sense of the ludicrous in the end of She that spoiled, instead of concluding with imaginative fitness, the thread of the impossible worked into the substance of this vivid and brilliantly told story". Haggard was moved to respond to the criticism of Ayesha's death, writing that "in the insolence of her strength and loveliness, she lifts herself up against the Omnipotent. Therefore, at the appointed time she is swept away by It... Vengeance, more heavy because more long delayed, strikes her in her proudest part – her beauty".

A number of reviews were more critical of Haggard's work. Although the reviewer of She in Blackwood's Edinburgh Magazine considered it better than King Solomon's Mines, he opined, "Mr. Rider Haggard has not proved as yet that he has anything that can be called imagination at all... It might be wrought up into an unparalleled stage effect: but it is rather a failure in pen and ink. The more fearful and wonderful such circumstances are intended to be, the more absurd is the failure of them". Even more scathing was Augustus Moore in the May edition of Time: A Monthly Miscellany, who declared: "In Mr Haggard's book I find none of the powerful imagination, the elaborate detail, the vivid English which would entitle his work to be described as a romance... [rather] it seems to me to be the method of the modern melodrama". Moore was particularly dismissive of the novel's style and prose: "Mr Haggard cannot write English at all. I do not merely refer to his bad grammar, which a boy at a Boarding School would deserve to be birched for... It can only have been written by a man who not only knew nothing, but cared nothing for 'English undefiled'." Haggard's English was a common source of criticisms, but Moore was even dismissive of the character of She, who was highly regarded by many other critics. "Ayesha", Moore declares, "is about as impressive as the singing chambermaid who represents the naughty fairy of a pantomime in tights and a tow wig". Concluding his review, Moore wondered at the success that had greeted She:

It is a sad thing to own that such a commonplace book as She... so crammed with tawdry sentiment and bad English should have become the success it has undoubtedly been. It is a bad sign for English literature and English taste, and argues that the English Press which has trumpeted its success must be utterly corrupt.

Despite such criticism, the reception that met She was overwhelmingly positive and echoed the sentiments expressed by anthropologist and literary critic Andrew Lang before the story's first publication: "I think She is one of the most astonishing romances I ever read. The more impossible it is, the better you do it, till it seems like a story from the literature of another planet".

The book Science-Fiction: The Early Years stated that She was "one of the great classics of fantastic fiction" and "as vital now as when it was first printed".

In his essay Supernatural Horror in Literature (1927), H.P. Lovecraft called She a 'really remarkably good' book and wrote that Haggard was continuing a 'romantic, semi-Gothic, quasi-moral tradition' first seen in the works of Sir Edward Bulwer-Lytton.

== Modern interpretations ==
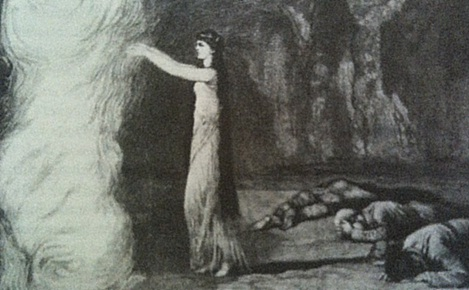
Illustration by E. K. Johnson for the Graphic (1887). Ayesha about to enter the Pillar of Fire, with Holly, Leo, and Job dumbstruck in fear. Feminist literary theory identifies Ayesha's death in the fire as punishment for her transgression of Victorian gender boundaries.

H. Rider Haggard described She as an investigation into love and immortality. The demise of Ayesha represents the moral end of this exploration:

When Ayesha in the course of ages grows hard, cynical, and regardless of that which stands between her and her ends, her love yet endures ... when at last the reward was in her sight ... she once more became (or at the moment imagined that she would become) what she had been before disillusion, disappointment, and two thousand wretched years of loneliness had turned her heart to stone ... and in her lover's very presence she is made to learn the thing she really is, and what is the end of earthly wisdom and of the loveliness she prised so highly.

Feminist literary criticism has generally viewed the figure of She as a literary manifestation of male anxieties in a time when changing gender roles fueled growing recognition of the "learned and crusading new woman". Ayesha, a terrifying and dominant figure, exemplifies the "fictive explorations of female authority" undertaken by male writers at the outset of literary modernism. Ann Ardis, for instance, views the dismay Holly feels over Ayesha's plan to return to England as reflecting "exactly those [concerns] voiced about the New Woman's entrance into the public arena". The death of She thus acts as a kind of teleological "judgement" on her transgression of Victorian gender boundaries, with Ardis likening it to a "witch-burning".

Scholars have more recently been inclined to note the ways the character still conforms to Victorian notions of femininity. Noteworthy here is the deference and devotion Ayesha exhibits towards Kallikrates/Leo, to whom she swears wifely obedience at the story's climax: "'Behold!' and she took his [Leo's] hand and placed it upon her shapely head, and then bent herself slowly down till one knee for an instant touched the ground – 'Behold! in token of submission do I bow me to my lord! Behold!' and she kissed him on the lips, 'in token of my wifely love do I kiss my lord'." Ayesha declares this to be the "first most holy hour of completed womanhood".

== Legacy ==
She is one of the most influential novels in modern literature. Several authors, including Rudyard Kipling, Henry Miller, Graham Greene, J.R.R. Tolkien and Margaret Atwood, have acknowledged its importance to their own and others' writing. With more than 83 million copies sold, the novel is one of the best-selling fictional works of all time and has been translated into 44 languages. According to Stauffer, "She has always been Rider Haggard's most popular and influential novel, challenged only by King Solomon's Mines in this regard". The novel is cited in the psychoanalytical theories of Sigmund Freud and Carl Jung, the latter describing the character of She as a manifestation of the anima figure.

The novel has had a lasting impact on the fantasy genre in particular, directly giving rise to the "lost civilisation" tales of Edgar Rice Burroughs and Sir Arthur Conan Doyle, and the creation of mythologised locations such as Shangri-la. Tolkien recognised the importance of She to his own fantasy works, especially in its foregrounding of a fictional history and narrative.

Some scholars have also discerned a She influence on Galadriel in The Lord of the Rings: Ayesha's reflecting pool seems to be a direct precursor of Galadriel's mirror. Other characters in Tolkien's Legendarium also seem to have been influenced, including Shelob (who is referred to as "She" and "Her" in the text), and the escape of the Fellowship of the Ring across the chasm in Moria may be reminiscent of the escape across the chasm near the end of She.

The "hot pot" ritual of Haggard's Amahagger people more recently appears to have been an inspiration or predecessor of the death of Viserys Targaryen in George R. R. Martin's A Game of Thrones.

At the World's Columbian Exposition in Chicago in 1893 the H. Jay Smith Exploring Company presented an exhibit of artefacts from the American Southwest featuring objects and human remains of the Basketmaker and Cliff Dweller (Ancestral Puebloan) cultures. The exhibit featured a mummy that had been preserved naturally by the southwestern climate and that was given the name "She".

Haggard's Ayesha has provided a template for female antagonists in numerous fantasy tales since. Her influence may be seen in characters such as the Maschinenmensch figure in the 1927 Fritz Lang film Metropolis and Jadis the White Witch in C. S. Lewis's The Chronicles of Narnia.

More recent examples of her influence include Kor and Ayesha in Alan Moore's Nemo: Heart of Ice. The name Ayesha is used in Marvel comics for the female superheroine Ayesha, leader of the Sovereign race, also known as Kismet. Her portrayal in the film Guardians of the Galaxy Vol. 2 2017 as a beautiful, powerful yet ruthless and cold empress recalls Haggard's regal character. Figures in George R. R. Martin's A Game of Thrones — Daenerys Targaryen, Cersei Lannister, and especially Melisandre of Asshai priestess of the god R'hllor — may also be seen as continuations of a literary tradition that launches with Ayesha of She.

=== Adaptations ===
She has been adapted for the cinema at least eleven times, beginning with the 1899 short film The Pillar of Fire, directed by Georges Méliès, followed by another short film directed by Edwin S. Porter in 1908. An American 1911 version starred Marguerite Snow, a British-produced version appeared in 1916, and in 1917 Valeska Suratt appeared in a production for Fox which is lost. In 1925 a silent film of She, starring Betty Blythe, was produced with the active participation of Rider Haggard, who wrote the intertitles. The film combines elements from all the books in the series.

A decade later, another cinematic version of the novel was released, featuring Helen Gahagan, Randolph Scott and Nigel Bruce. This 1935 adaptation was set in the Arctic, rather than Africa, and depicts the ancient civilisation of the story in an Art Deco style, with music by Max Steiner. Roger Corman announced in 1958 that he would direct a film version in Australia, but the film was never made.

The 1965 film She was produced by Hammer Film Productions, and starred Ursula Andress as Ayesha and John Richardson as her reincarnated love, with Peter Cushing as Holly, Christopher Lee as Billali and Bernard Cribbins as Job.

A post-apocalyptic film version of the same title, directed by Avi Nesher, was released in the United States in 1985.

In 2001, another adaption was released direct to video with Ian Duncan as Leo Vincey, Ophélie Winter as Ayesha and Marie Bäumer as Roxane.

Tim McInnerny starred as Holly (renamed Ludwig Holly) with Mia Soteriou as Ayesha and Oliver Chris as Leo in a two-part adaptation on BBC Radio 4's Classic Serial, originally broadcast on 2 July and 9 July 2006.

In 2007, a rock-opera/musical version of She was recorded live at the Wyspianski Theatre, Katowice, Poland by Clive Nolan and was released on DVD. In February 2012, the Nolan version of She had its first UK performance at the Playhouse in Cheltenham.

According to Financial Times reviewer James Lovegrove, Juliet E. McKenna's 2012 She-who-thinks-for-herself, is "a cunning, funny... feminist rewrite" of She.

=== Sequel and prequels ===
- Ayesha, the Return of She, published in 1905
- She and Allan, published in 1921
- Wisdom's Daughter, published in 1923
- Sherlock Holmes on the Roof of the World, published in 1987, a pastiche by Thomas Kent Miller and referenced as the first true sequel to She: A History of Adventure

=== Editions ===
- She: A History of Adventure (1886–87) – serialised in the Graphic magazine
- She: A History of Adventure (1887) – first edition
- She: A History of Adventure (1891) – revised edition
- She: A History of Adventure (1896) – second revised edition
- The Annotated She: A Critical Edition of H. Rider Haggard's Victorian Romance (Visions Series), Bloomington, Indiana University Press; Annotated edition, Edited and Annotated by Norman Etherington (22 August 1991) – ISBN 0-25-332072-0/ISBN 978-0-25-332072-8 – mentions all the revisions in the text
- She: A History of Adventure, Edited by Andrew M. Stauffer (Broadview Press) (1 February 2006) – ISBN 1-55-111647-2/ISBN 978-1-55-111647-1 – mentions only the major revisions in the text

== Sources ==
- Aldiss, Brian (2002). Billion Year Spree. New York: St Martin's. ISBN 978-0-297-76555-4.
- Auerbach, Nina (1982). Woman and the Demon: The Life of a Victorian Myth. London: Harvard University Press. ISBN 978-0-674-95407-6.
- Austin, Sue. "Desire, Fascination and the Other: Some Thoughts on Jung's Interest in Rider Haggard's 'She' and on the Nature of Archetypes", Harvest: International Journal for Jungian Studies, 2004, Vol. 50, No. 2.
- Bleiler, Everett (1948). The Checklist of Fantastic Literature. Chicago: Shasta Publishers.
- Brantlinger, Patrick (2001). "Introduction". She. London: Penguin Classics. pp. vii–xxxiii. ISBN 978-0-14-043763-8.
- Fuller, Alexandra (2002). "Introduction". King Solomon's Mines. London: Modern Library Edition.
- Gilbert, Sarah M (1983). "Rider Haggard's Heart of Darkness". In Slusser, G. E; Scholes, R (eds.). Coordinates: Placing science fiction and fantasy. USA: Southern Illinois University Press.
- Gilbert, Sandra; Gubar, Sandra (1998). No Man's Land: The Place of the Woman Writer in the Twentieth Century. Vol. 2. Yale University Press. ISBN 978-0-300-06660-9.
- Haggard, H. Rider (1926). The Days of My Life. London: Longmans, Green, and Co.
- Haggard, H. Rider (May 1877), "The Transvaal", Macmillan's Magazine, 36: 71–79
- Haggard, Lilias Rider (1951). The Cloak That I Left Behind: A Biography of the Author Henry Rider Haggard KBE. London: Hodder and Stoughton.
- Ledger, Sally, ed. (1995). Cultural Politics at the Fin de Siècle. Cambridge, England: Cambridge University Press. ISBN 978-0-521-48499-2.
- Marshall, Gail, ed. (2007). The Cambridge Companion to the fin de siècle. Cambridge Companions. Cambridge, England: Cambridge University Press. ISBN 978-0-521-61561-7.
- Stauffer, Andrew M. (2006). "Introduction". She. Toronto: Broadview. pp. 9–29. ISBN 978-1-55111-647-1.
- Wilt, Judith (1980–81). "The Imperial Mouth: Imperialism, the Gothic, and Science Fiction". Journal of Popular Culture. 14 (4): 618–628. doi:10.1111/j.0022-3840.1981.00618.x.
