= Maryland railway station =

National Rail station in London, England

Maryland
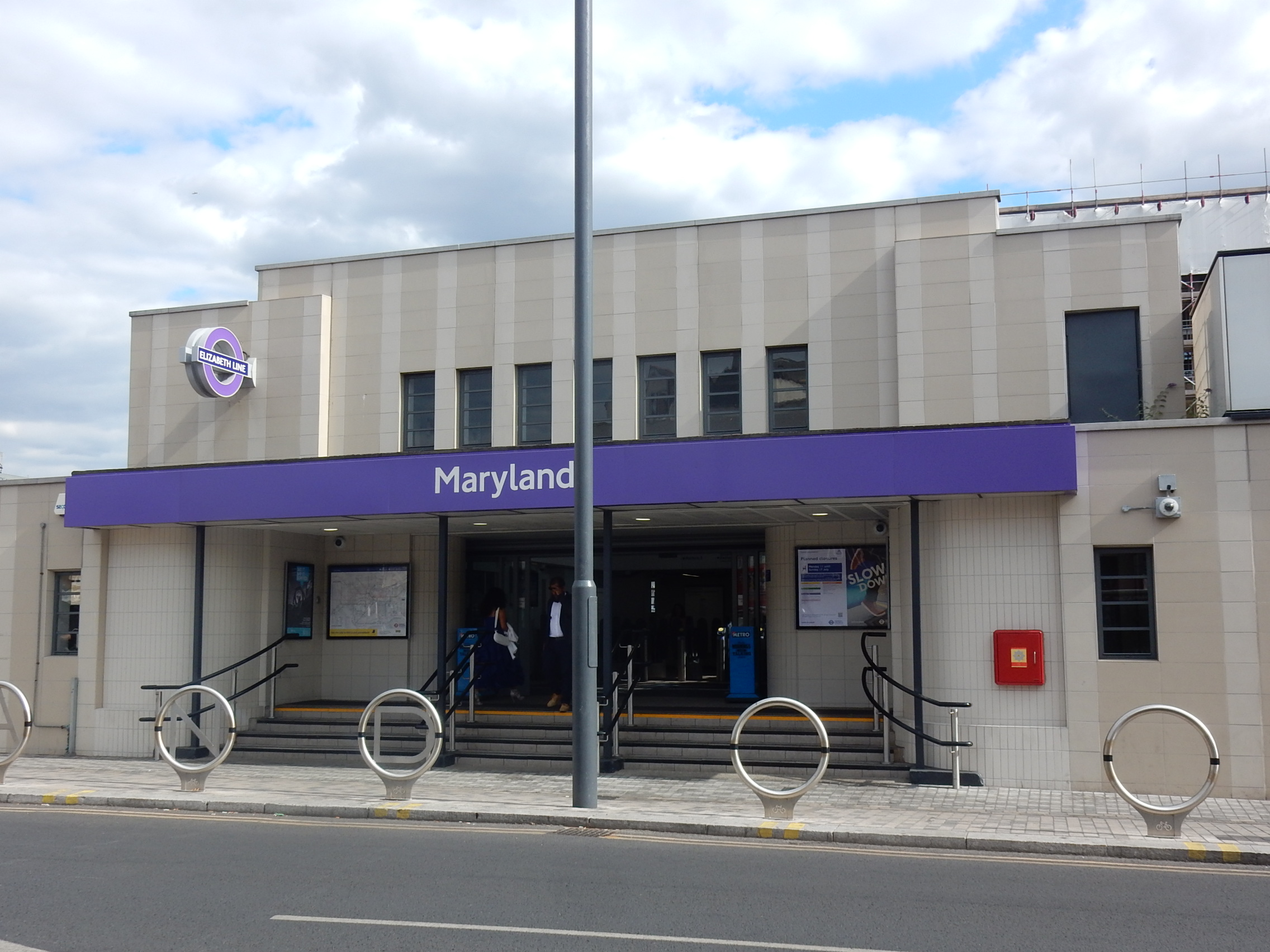
- Interactive map of Maryland

General information
- Location: Maryland
- Local authority: London Borough of Newham
- Managed by: Elizabeth line
- Owner: Network Rail
- Station code: MYL
- Number of platforms: 4
- Accessible: Yes
- Fare zone: 3

National Rail annual entry and exit
- 2021–22: ▲1.430 million
- 2022–23: ▲2.788 million
- 2023–24: ▲4.714 million
- 2024–25: ▼4.055 million
- 2025–26: ▲4.378 million

Railway companies
- Pre-grouping: Great Eastern Railway
- Post-grouping: London and North Eastern Railway

Key dates
- 6 January 1873: Opened as Maryland Point
- 28 October 1940: Renamed Maryland

Other information
- External links: Departures; Facilities
- Coordinates: 51.546°N 0.0059°E

Maryland railway station is on the Great Eastern Main Line serving the Maryland area of the London Borough of Newham, east London. It is 4 miles 39 chains (7.2 km) down the line from London Liverpool Street and is situated between Stratford and Forest Gate. Its three-letter station code is MYL and it is in London fare zone 3.

The station was opened in 1873 as Maryland Point by the Great Eastern Railway. It was renamed Maryland in 1940. It is managed and served by the Elizabeth line between Shenfield and Heathrow Airport.

== History ==
=== Great Eastern Railway (1873–1922) ===
The railway through the site of Maryland station was first built in 1839 by the Eastern Counties Railway as the first part of what was later to become the Great Eastern Main Line. Trains initially ran between Mile End and Romford.

By the 1860s, the railways in East Anglia were in financial trouble and most were leased to the Eastern Counties Railway (ECR). Although they wished to amalgamate formally, they could not obtain government agreement for this until 1862, when the Great Eastern Railway (GER) was formed.

Maryland Point station was opened by the Great Eastern Railway on 6 January 1873.

Between Stratford and Maryland Point were some cattle pens (a staple of early ECR goods traffic) and sidings as well as two additional running lines. The new station was located just after the two track section began and is located between the bridges carrying Grove Road and Water Lane over the railway.

The area west of the station was remodelled c1877 and, in 1877 and again in 1882 the station platforms were lengthened.

As London grew, developers starting acquiring land to build new properties and the demand at stations such as Maryland Point increased. The GER realised that the two track main line was not enough to cope with the new suburban and longer distance traffic, and still provide a reliable service for the minor stations. The answer was a programme of quadrupling (providing two additional tracks) along the route and this work took place in phases. In the case of Maryland the changes were extensive.

The alignment was extended north and south of the existing station, with the original alignment in the middle of today's platforms 2 and 3. When the station was built platforms were only built on the northernmost lines which were named the Local Lines. The other lines used for longer distance trains were named the Through Lines. Improved entrances were provided at both ends of the station with stairs down to the platforms.

In the 1870s prior to the station opening, the first signal box was located where the down platform was built. When the station was built a new signal box (1872) was provided west of Grove Road bridge. This only lasted until 1891 when the tracks were re-aligned due to the quadrupling through the station area and the new box was situated slightly to the south between the two sets of running lines. At the same time a short lived signal box existed at Maryland Point East Junction where the four tracks went down to two tracks, but once the four tracks were extended to Forest Gate, the junction was abolished and there was no need for the signal box.

In 1907 the station was equipped with electric lighting.

Table 298 of the Bradshaw's timetable guide of July 1922 shows Maryland Point to have a regular services of trains from Liverpool Street or Fenchurch Street. These trains terminated at Ilford, Chadwell Heath, Romford or Gidea Park or worked through to the Fairlop Loop.

In 1923, the GER amalgamated with other railways to form the London and North Eastern Railway (LNER).

=== London and North Eastern Railway (1923–1947) ===
During this period local stopping trains were generally hauled by LNER Class N7 locomotives on trains of corridor type carriage stock.

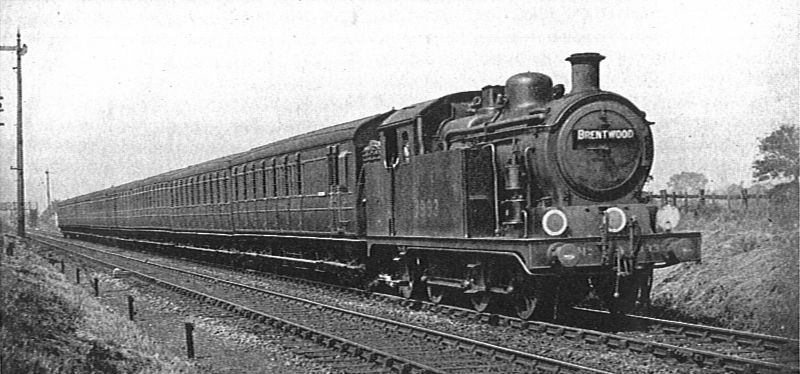
A typical LNER Suburban train, GER section of the LNER (CJ Allen, Steel Highway, 1928)

Plans were drawn up in the 1930s to electrify the suburban lines from Liverpool Street to Shenfield at 1,500 V DC and work was started on implementing this. However, the outbreak of World War II, brought most of the project to a temporary halt and it was not until 1949 that the scheme was completed.

On 28 October 1940 the station was named Maryland.

The signal box was closed as part of the electrification scheme on 29 August 1946.

As part of the electrification scheme a flyover was built just north of Manor Park. The flyover was designed to remove conflicting moves between Local Line and Through Line trains and meant that Maryland, Forest Gate and Manor Park stations required new platforms to be provided on the Through Lines as these three locations only had Local Line platforms after the 1893/4 quadrupling.

However, work on Maryland station was progressed during the war years despite manpower and steel shortages. Key changes included:

- Extension of the cutting south (towards Manbey Road) for the new platform;
- Existing up platform converted to an island platform;
- Demolition of the Water Lane entrance building (dating from 1890);
- New main entrance in LNER Art deco style;
- New platform canopies;
- and, Overhead line masts.

The new station buildings, were designed by Thomas Bennett.

=== British Railways (1948–1994) ===
On 1 January 1948, following nationalisation of the railways, Maryland became part of the British Railways Eastern Region. The electrification scheme and its associated works were finished and from February 1949 the Class 306 EMUs operated the service to steam timings with an accelerated all electric schedule being introduced in September 1949.

The 1500 DC electrification system was converted to 25/6.35 KV AC operation between 4 and 6 November 1960.

In 1980 the first Class 315 EMUs were introduced to replace the Class 306s and were used on passenger trains serving Maryland.

The railway was sectorised in 1982 and Maryland and the trains calling at it became part of the London and South-East sector. On 10 June 1986 this was rebranded to become Network South East which was responsible for working services up to privatisation.

=== Privatisation era (1994-present) ===
In April 1994 Railtrack became responsible for the maintenance of the infrastructure. Railtrack was succeeded by Network Rail in 2002.

Between privatisation on 1 April 1994 and 4 January 1997 the station was operated by a non-privatised business unit. Since then passenger services calling at the station have been operated by the following franchises:

- First Great Eastern 5 January 1997 – 31 March 2004
- National Express East Anglia 1 April 2004 – 4 February 2012
- Abellio Greater Anglia between 5 February 2012– 30 May 2015
- MTR TFL Rail between 31 May 2015 and 23 May 2022 after which the line was rebranded as the Elizabeth line who are the current operator.

Maryland was added to the planned Crossrail route in 2006 after campaigning by Newham Council, the London Transport Users Committee and others. An agreement was also reached about improving access to the station.

Maryland was closed between 27 July and 12 August 2012, during the 2012 Olympic Games, as it would have been unable to cope with the large numbers of spectators who might have used it to access the venues nearby at the Olympic Park.

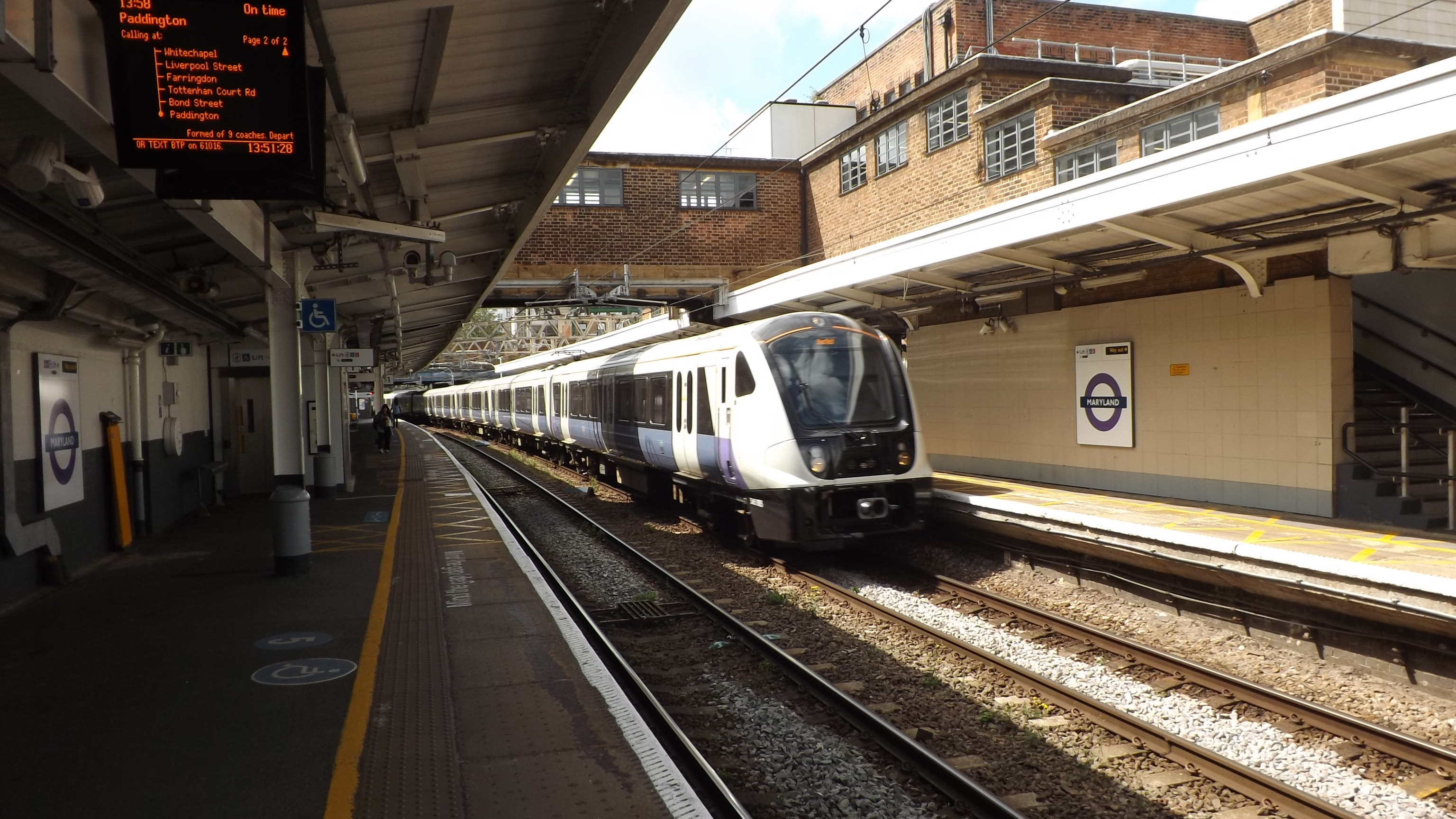
DSCF0850 Elizabeth line train, Maryland

In June 2017, new Class 345 trains began entering service in preparation for the opening of the Crossrail initially working between Liverpool Street and Shenfield.

In early 2019 step free access was introduced to Maryland station.

The Class 315 trains were finally taken out of service in 2022. Through services to central London and Heathrow Airport started running on the Crossrail-constructed Elizabeth line on 22 November 2022.

== Design ==
At 169 metres (185 yd), the platforms are too short for Elizabeth Line trains which are over 200 metres (220 yd) in length, and extending the platforms is impossible due to geographical constraints. Transport for London therefore makes use of selective door operation such that doors on some end carriages do not open at Maryland. Of the four platforms, only the two serving the stopping "metro" lines are in regular operation, the others being used only when necessary during engineering works or temporary train path diversions.

== Location ==
The station is one of the primary rail access points for the residential areas in the north of Stratford and the south of Leytonstone in east London. The area surrounding the station has seen much redevelopment in the 21st century, with ongoing improvements underway related to the nearby Olympic Park. The "twisted clock" timepiece/sculpture formerly installed outside Stratford station was relocated to Maryland in 2010.

The Cart and Horses pub is next to the station on Maryland Point. It was an important early gig venue for the rock band Iron Maiden.

London Buses routes 69, 257, 308, school route 678 and night route N8 serve the station.

== Services ==
All services at Maryland are operated by the Elizabeth line using Class 345 EMUs.

The typical Monday to Friday off-peak service in trains per hour is:

- 8 tph to London Paddington of which 2 continue to Heathrow Terminal 5
- 8 tph to Shenfield

During the peak hours, the station is served by a number of additional services between London Liverpool Street and Gidea Park. These services do not call at Whitechapel.

On Sundays, the service to and from Shenfield is reduced to 4 tph, with alternating services running only as far as Gidea Park.

Preceding station	Elizabeth line	Following station
Stratford towards Heathrow Terminal 5	Elizabeth line	Forest Gate towards Shenfield
