= Viola Alberti =

American silent film actress

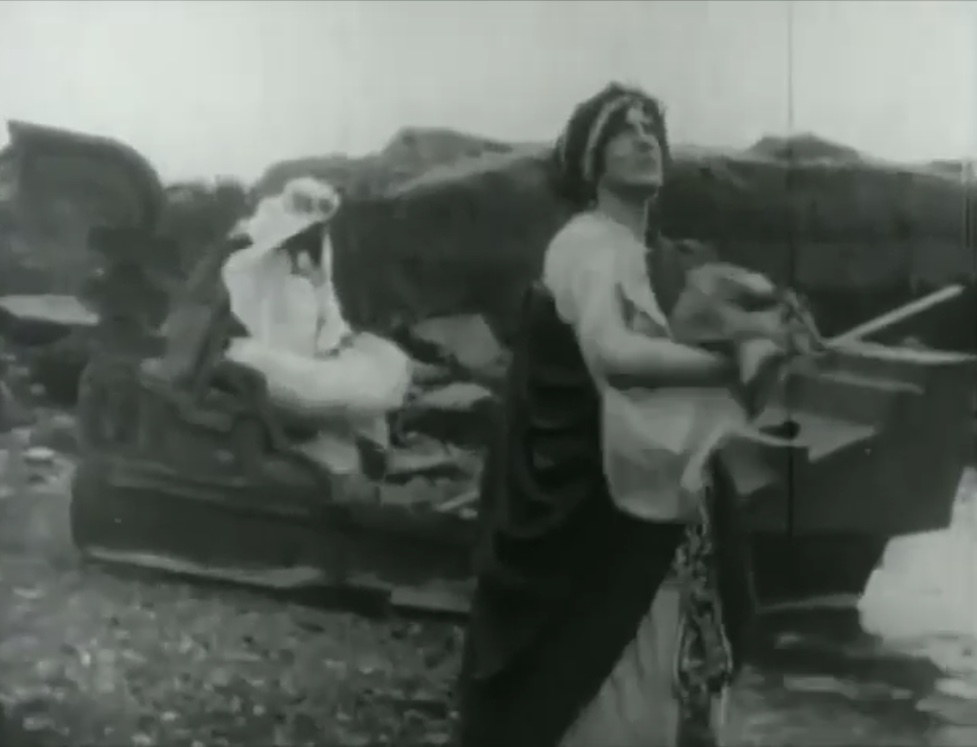
Viola Alberti as Amenartas in She (1911)

Mary Viola Alberti (10 July 1871 – 8 May 1957) was an American actress of the silent era known for being the first actress to play Betsey Trotwood in film - namely in the 1911 versions of David Copperfield.

== Early years ==
She was born in Lewistown in Pennsylvania as Mary Viola Alberti, the daughter of Susan Ann, née Sills, (1839–1910) and George Wetheholt Alberti (1839–1904), an editor. She was educated in public schools in San Francisco and on leaving school began a stage career for five years. She was married to the actor and film director George O. Nicholls from 1896 until his death and appeared in many of his early films. With him she had a son, the film director George Nicholls Jr., and after his birth in 1897, she took time out from her stage career to raise him. After a prolific film career in the 1910s, she retired from acting in 1916. Many of her films were made with the Thanhouser Company.

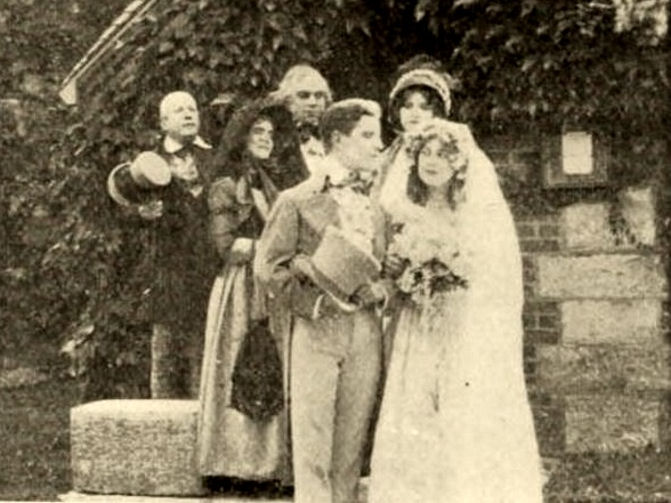
Viola Alberti (second from left) as Betsey Trotwood in David Copperfield (1911)

== Career ==
Alberti's film roles included: Mistress of the Boarding House in On Her Wedding Day (1913); Corella - the Gypsy in The Wine of Madness (1913); The Gypsy Girl in The Girl and the Judge (1913); Dolores' Mother in Dolores' Decision (1913); Countess Fosco in The Woman in White (1912); The Chanoinesse in The Celebrated Case (1912); Mrs. Prim in Why Tom Signed the Pledge (1912); in Miss Arabella Snaith (1912); The Arab's Wife in Into the Desert (1912); Mary in The Taming of Mary (1912); The Wife in On Probation (1912); Amenartes, the Pharaoh's daughter in She (1911), and Betsey Trotwood in David Copperfield (1911).

By 1913, Alberti was a teacher of drama and pantomime. Later she went to the Selig Polyscope Company, where in 1915 she wrote the scenarios for and acted in When Love Was Mocked and also acted in The Print of the Nails (1915); played the Society Leader in The Sculptor's Model (1915) and Mrs. Brentwood in The Eternal Feminine (1915). The Studio Directory of Motion Picture News for 29 January 1916 noted that she was "now at liberty."

== Death ==
Alberti died in San Francisco in 1957, aged 85.
