= William C. Cooper (actor) =

American actor

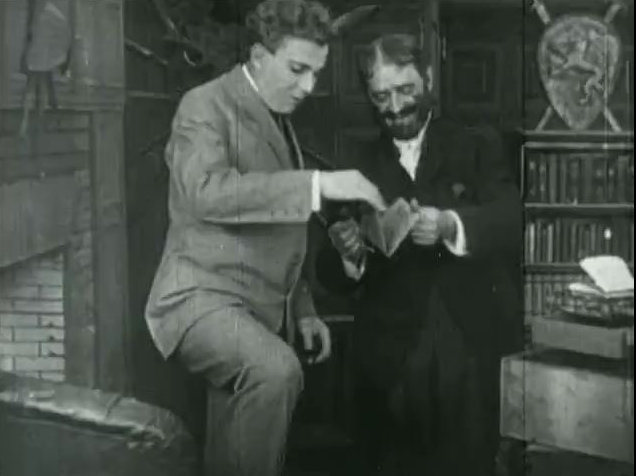
James Cruze (left) as Leo Vincey and William C. Cooper as Horace Holly in She (1911)

William C. Cooper (1853 – 13 June 1918) was a British-born stage and film actor who made a career in silent-film in the United States.

Born as William C. Cowper in Manchester in England in 1853, he was educated in his home city. On moving to the USA he appeared with Charles Frohman, William Gillette and Lawrence Barrett among others, and later acted in his own plays of which he wrote 28 and produced nine. He later became a naturalised American citizen.

In about 1910 he moved into films, acting for such companied as Pathé, Famous Players, the Thanhouser Company and Metro Pictures. For Thanhouser he was Horace Holly in the 1911 film She (as William C. Cooper) and for Metro in 1916 he was the Father in Dimples (as William Cowper). Also as William Cowper he played The Artist in Gold Is Not All (1913) and, in 1915, Si Stork in Emmy of Stork's Nest, Tobias Rader in A Yellow Streak and Wulf Axtell in An Enemy to Society. For Mutual Film he acted in Our Mutual Girl (1914), while for Famous Players he was Elder Sprague in The Redemption of David Corson (1914). Cooper also appeared in Mother's Darling Little Boy [1914), Blown Upon (1915) and A Domestic Revolution (1915).

In directories for 1916-1918 Cooper was recorded as living at 987 Tinton Avenue in the Bronx in New York and listed his hobbies as horseback riding, swimming and boxing.

Will C. Cooper died in June 1918 and was buried in Evergreen Cemetery in Brooklyn, New York.
