= The Pillar of Fire =

- Directed by: Georges Méliès
- Production company: Star Film Company
- Release date: 1899
- Running time: 1 minute
- Country: France
- Language: Silent

The Pillar of Fire (French: Danse du feu), initially released in America and Britain as Haggard's "She"—The Pillar of Fire and also known as La Colonne de feu, is an 1899 silent trick film directed by Georges Méliès based on H. Rider Haggard's 1887 novel She: A History of Adventure. It is an early fantasy film depicting a devil.

== Summary ==
A devil cavorts in a large fireplace, kindling a fire. Out of a giant skillet rises a young woman in voluminous white robes. As smoke rises in the fireplace, the woman begins a serpentine dance. Her skirts take on the appearance of flames until, finally, she disappears in a burst of fire.

== Production ==
The Pillar of Fire was the first film to be based on H. Rider Haggard's 1887 novel She: A History of Adventure. Rather than attempting to tell the whole story of the novel, Méliès used one of its characters as inspiration for a trick film, recalling the scene in the novel in which Ayesha stands amid flames. At least six other adaptations of She were made in the silent era.

== Release ==
The film was released by Méliès's Star Film Company and is numbered 188 in its catalogues. While the film was marketed in America and Britain as Haggard's She, emphasizing the connection with the popular novel, it was offered simply as Danse du feu in France, with no mention of Haggard.

Like many of Méliès's films, The Pillar of Fire was offered in a hand-colored print with coloring designed and directed by Elisabeth Thuillier. The surviving hand-colored print of the film is an ornate example of Thuillier's work for Méliès.
