= Elizabeth Glaister =

English novelist and needlework writer

- Born: 21 April 1839; Beckley, East Sussex
- Died: 10 May 1892 (aged 53); Southwell, Nottinghamshire
- Occupation: writer

Elizabeth Glaister (21 April 1839 – 10 May 1892) was an English novelist and needlework writer.

== Life ==
Glaister was born in Beckley in 1839. Her parents were Elizabeth (born Burrill) and the Reverend William Glaister. She was the first of their four children. Her father was the rector of All Saints Church in Beckley in Sussex. Her father died in 1861 and her brother, another Reverend William Glaister, became an important figure in her life. In 1871, she and her mother and two of her siblings, Lucinda and Harry, moved from Hastings to be closer to her brother in Southwell in Nottinghamshire.

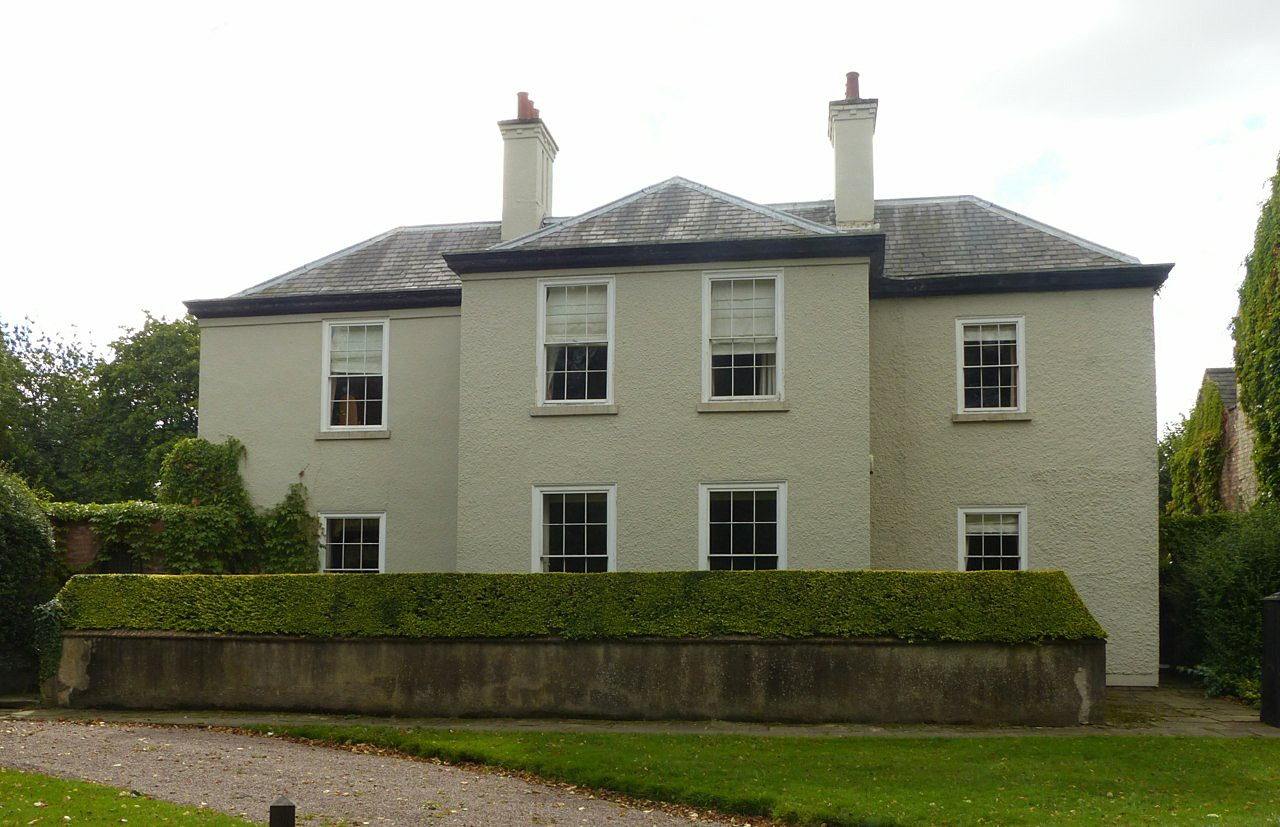
"The Burgage" in Southwell is now a listed building

In 1873, Marcus Ward & Co. published her first novel, The Markhams of Ollerton which referred to the church of Southwell Minster.

Her brother, William, was the curate and later vicar of St Wulfram's Church, Grantham (in 1876). Elizabeth created ecclesiastical embroideries for the church and in 1878 her brother published a book about the "Life and Times of S[aint] Wulfram".

She and her cousin, Mortimer Sarah Lockwood, worked together to create a study of Art Needlework that was published in 1878. It was an early study of "Art Embroidery" that was "a Treatise on the Revived Practice of Decorative Needlework".

In 1880 she published a book titled "Needlework". It was requested by Macmillan & Co for a series of books they published called Art at Home. It had mixed reviews, the Westminster Review called it "amateurish" and of not "much use to any practised worker in silk of crewell" even though it had included material from her previous work and designs by Thomas Crane. Myra’s Journal of Dress and Fashion noted that her volume gave "much needed counsel".

Glaister died in Southwell in 1892 in The Burbage.
