= Thomas Crane (1808–1859) =

English painter

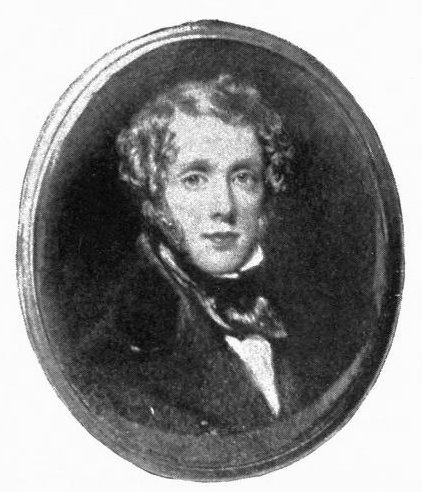
- Self-portrait, around 1840
- Born: 1808; Chester, England
- Died: 1859 (aged 50–51); London
- Known for: Portraiture

Thomas Crane (1808–1859) was an English artist and portrait painter.

== Life ==
Crane was born at Chester in 1808 to Thomas Crane, a bookseller. The young Thomas was in a family of six sisters and three sons. In 1824, having shown early a taste for art, he went to London, and joined the Royal Academy schools. There he remained for two years, receiving, in 1825, a medal for drawings from the antique.

Returning to Chester, he commenced his profession as a miniature painter, and not very long after, he published, in conjunction with a brother, some sketches of celebrated characters in North Wales, including Lady Eleanor Butler and Miss Ponsonby, the eccentric "Ladies of Llangollen". In 1832 he exhibited at the Liverpool Academy for the first time, and continued to show there for many years. In 1835 he was elected an associate of the academy, and in 1838 a full member. In the following year he married, and moved back to London, where he lived for some time, but found the capital unsuitable, due to his predisposition to pulmonary disease. After trying Leamington and other places, he moved to Liverpool, and in 1841 was elected treasurer of the academy there.

The delicate state of his health led him to move again, to Torquay, where he lived for twelve years, occasionally returning to north-west England, in order to procure more lucrative commissions. His health having apparently improved, he moved to Bayswater in London in 1857. However his illness reasserted itself, and he died in July 1859, leaving a widow and four children.

His obituary in the Art Journal described him as "a portrait-painter of considerable provincial celebrity, and not altogether unknown and unappreciated in London."

Crane's daughter Lucy was a writer and art critic, while his eldest son, also named Thomas, was an illustrator and art director at Marcus Ward & Co. Crane's second son, Walter Crane, was one of the most prolific and influential illustrators of his time.

== Works ==
Crane was, according to his obituary, "most successful in portraits of females and children, both in oil and water-colours; his treatment of such subjects being so elegant and so full of fancy as almost to make them ideal works, yet without compromising their likeness." As well as working as a portraitist, he also painted figure subjects, including The First Whisper of Love,The Deserted Village,The Cobbler, The Old Romance, The Bay Window, and Masquerading, most of which were exhibited at the Royal Academy.

He illustrated several books, including a nursery rhyme called The History of Mr Pig and Miss Crane, published in 1836.

== Gallery ==
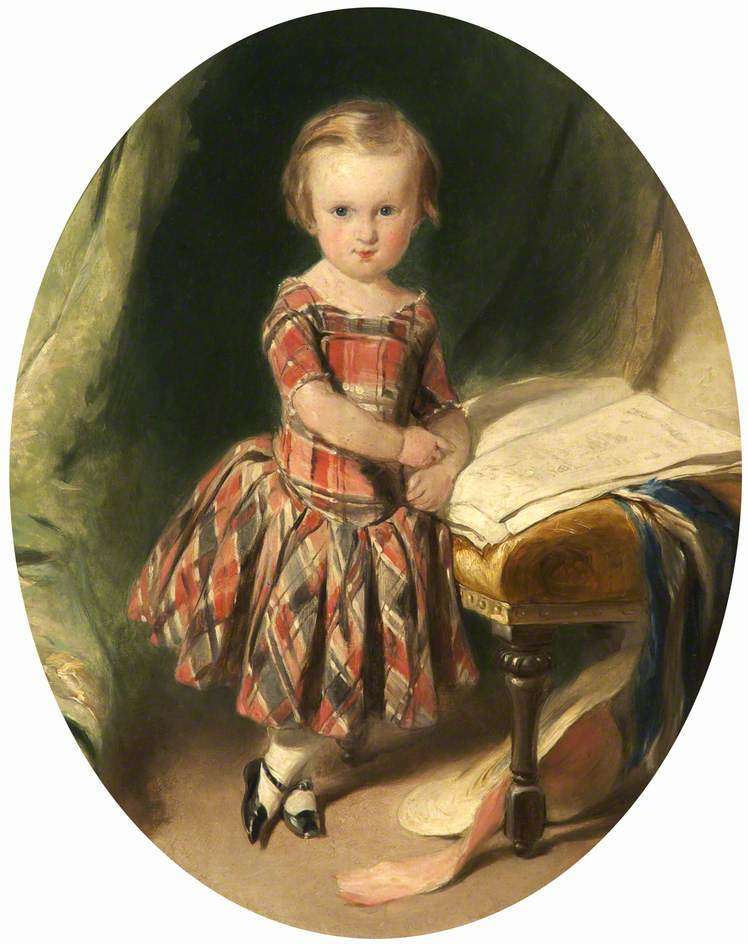
Oil painting of Walter Crane as a child, 1846

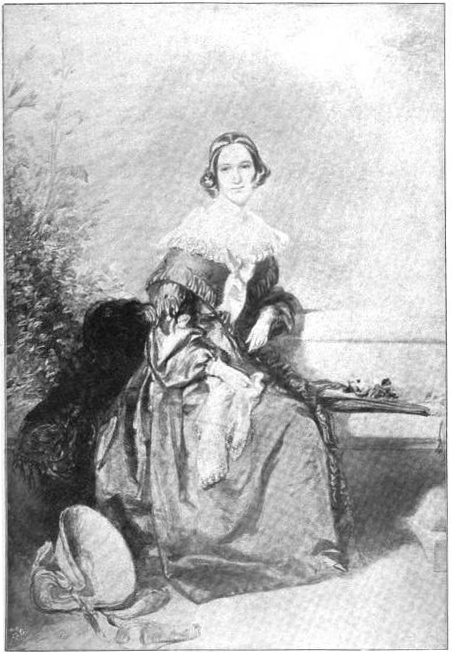
Watercolour of Crane's wife Marie, 1840

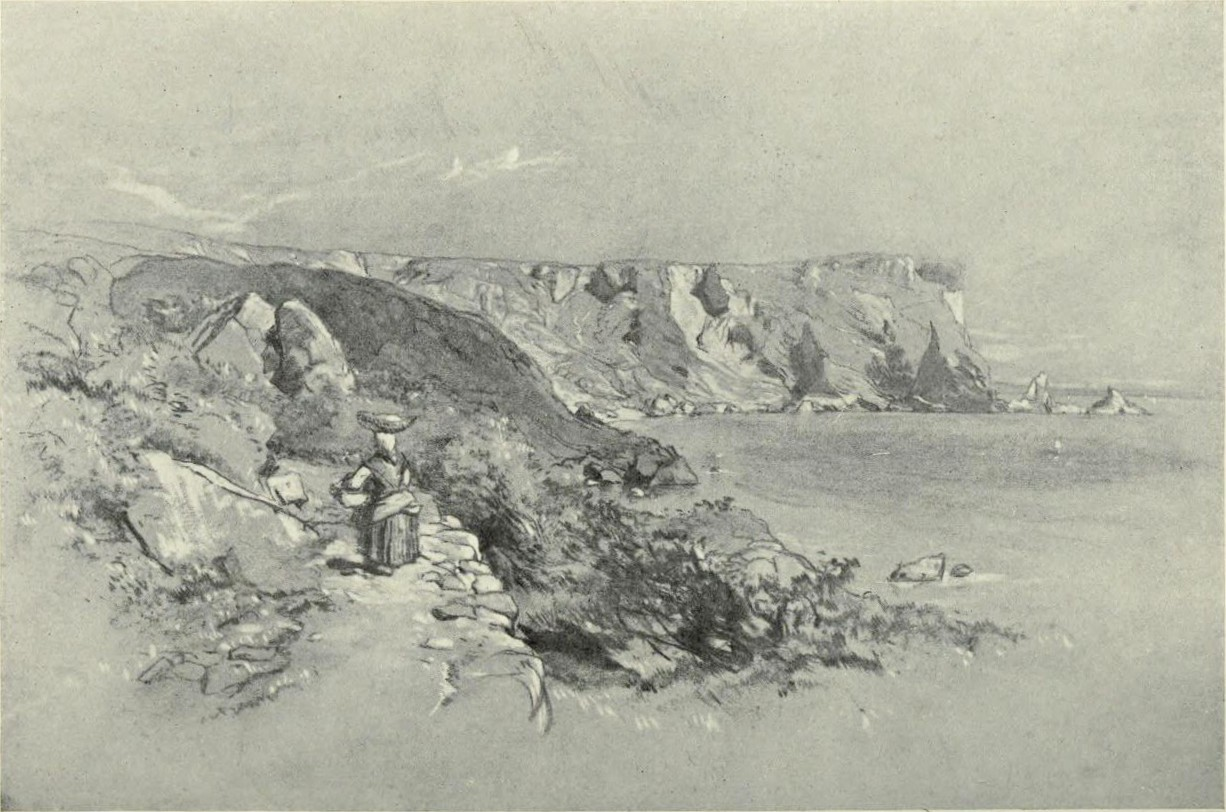
Anstey's Cove, charcoal drawing

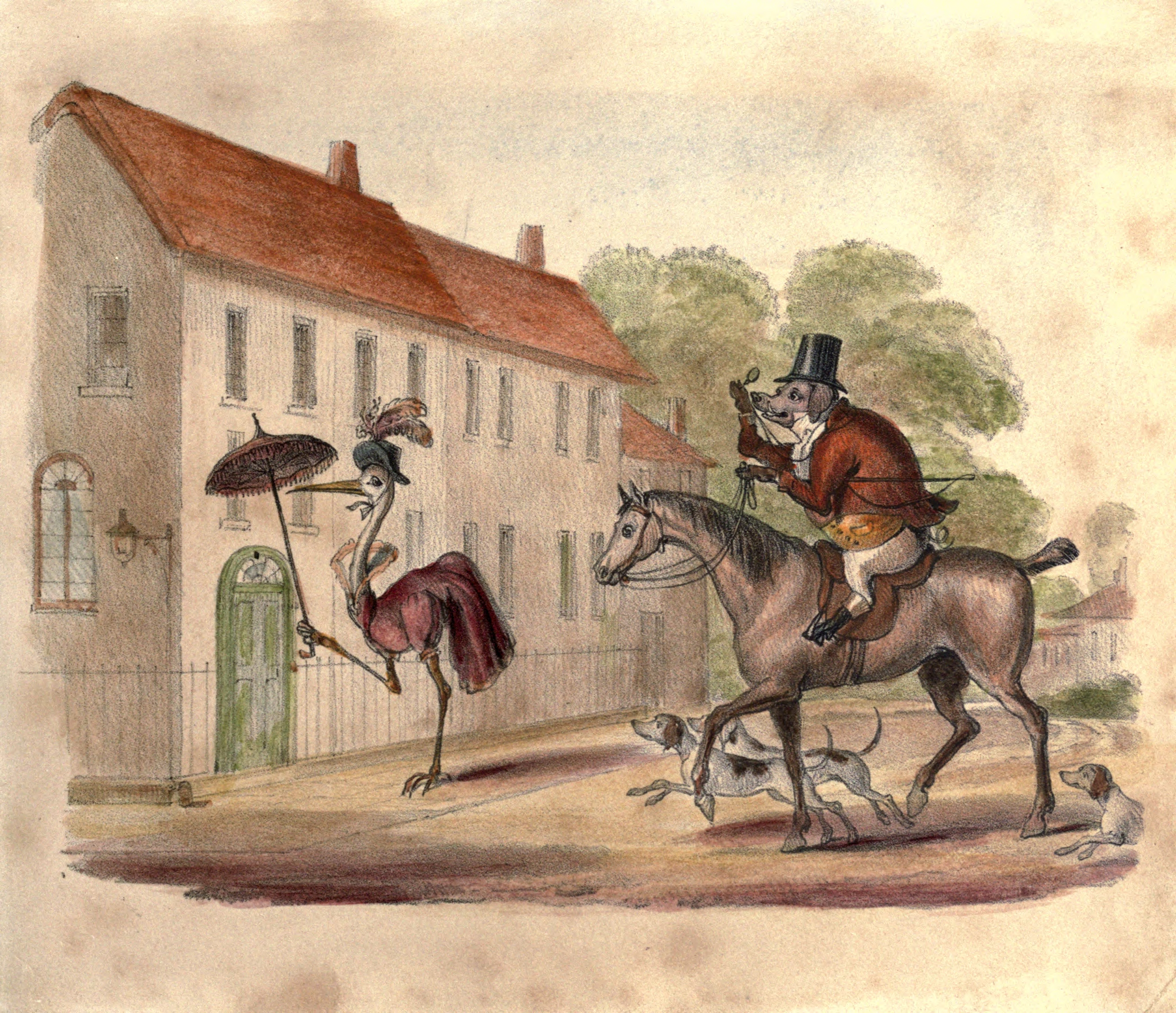
Plate from Life and Adventures of Mr. Pig and Miss Crane.
