= Beckley, East Sussex =

Village and parish in East Sussex, England

Coordinates: 50.99°N 0.64°E

Beckley
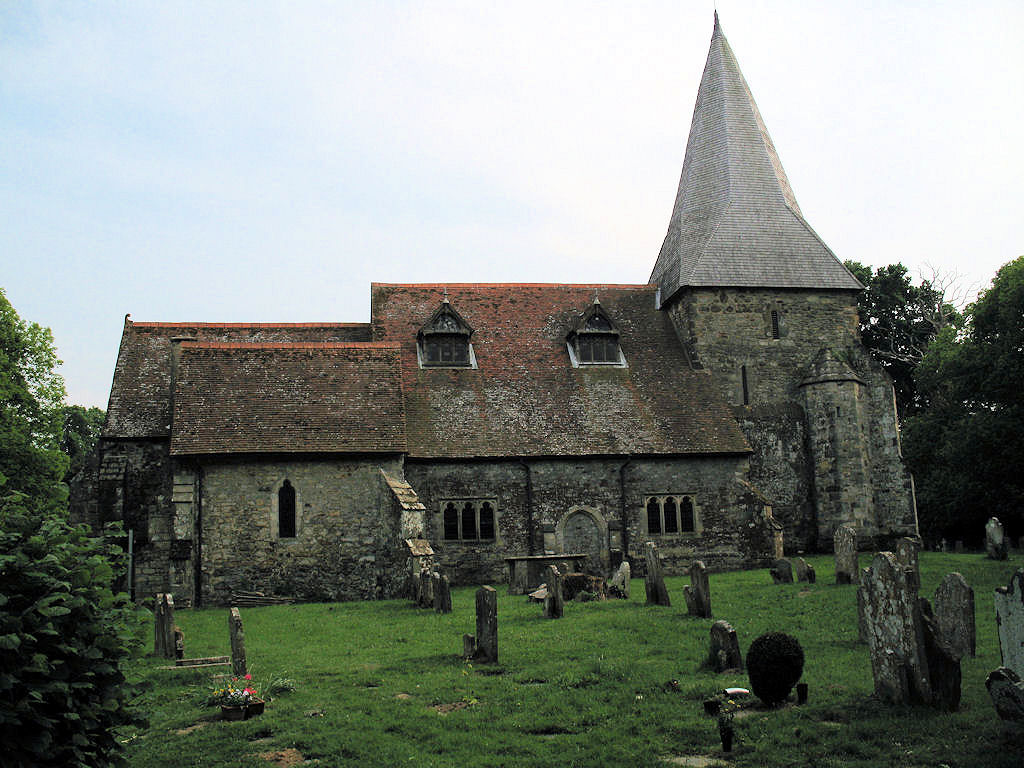
- All Saints Church

- Location within East Sussex
- Area: 22.8 km^{2} (8.8 sq mi)
- Population: 1,037 (Parish-2011)
  - Density: 115/sq mi (44/km^{2})
- OS grid reference: TQ852239
  - London: 48 miles (77 km) NW
- District: Rother
- Shire county: East Sussex
- Region: South East
- Country: England
- Sovereign state: United Kingdom
- Post town: RYE
- Postcode district: TN31
- Dialling code: 01797
- Police: Sussex
- Fire: East Sussex
- Ambulance: South East Coast
- UK Parliament: Bexhill and Battle
- Website: Beckley Council

Beckley is a village and civil parish in the Rother district of East Sussex, England. It is located on the B2088 minor road above the Rother Levels five miles (8.0 km) northwest of Rye and ten miles (16 km) from Hastings. The northern border follows the river Rother.

== History ==
Beckley was part of the Wealden iron industry. An iron furnace was built in 1578, at the small settlement still called Beckley Furnace. A watermill powered the bellows. Production ceased in 1770.

The 1830s saw a mass emigration of Beckley residents to New South Wales. At the time, the developing colony of New South Wales was in need of skilled agricultural labourers, whilst the English labourers were suffering hard times. Various schemes were introduced to provide finance for workers to emigrate. 165 Beckley residents took up the offer and emigrated. Amongst those residents were Thomas and Maria Ann Smith (née Sherwood), the cultivator of the Granny Smith apple. Another of those residents who emigrated at this time was Henry Charles Packham, whose son Charles, in Molong, New South Wales, was the cultivator of the Packham pear. A young emigrant who did well was George Fielder (1827–1913) the illegitimate son of Hannah Bowlin and George Parsons of Yew Tree Farm, Northiam. He emigrated in 1838 on the "James Pattison" with his mother and stepfather, became a miller in Tamworth and founded the flour milling company George Fielder & Co. now controlled by the international conglomerate Wilmar

The parish church is the All Saints church, which is located at the far west end of the town. The Revd William Glaister was the rector here in 1839 when his daughter Elizabeth Glaister was born. She would be an author and embroiderer.

A notable person from Beckley was George Elliott, a bricklayer who founded the town of Sussex, Wisconsin in 1843.

== Governance ==
The lowest level of government is the Beckley parish council which meets once a month. The parish council is responsible for local amenities such as the provision of litter bins, bus shelters and allotments. They also provide a voice into the district council meetings. The parish council comprises seven councillors with elections being held every four years. The May 2007 election was uncontested.

Current details about the Parish can be found on the official Parish Council website.

Rother District council provides the next level of government with services such as refuse collection, planning consent, leisure amenities and council tax collection. Beckley lies within the Rother Levels ward, which provides two councillors. The May 2007 election returned two Conservatives councillors.

East Sussex county council is the third tier of government, providing education, libraries and highway maintenance. Beckley falls within the Northern Rother ward. Peter Jones, Conservative, was elected in the May 2005 election with 49.7% of the vote.

The UK Parliament constituency for Beckley is Bexhill and Battle.

Prior to Brexit in 2020, Beckley was part of the South East England constituency in the European Parliament.
