= Thomas Crane (1843–1903) =

English painter

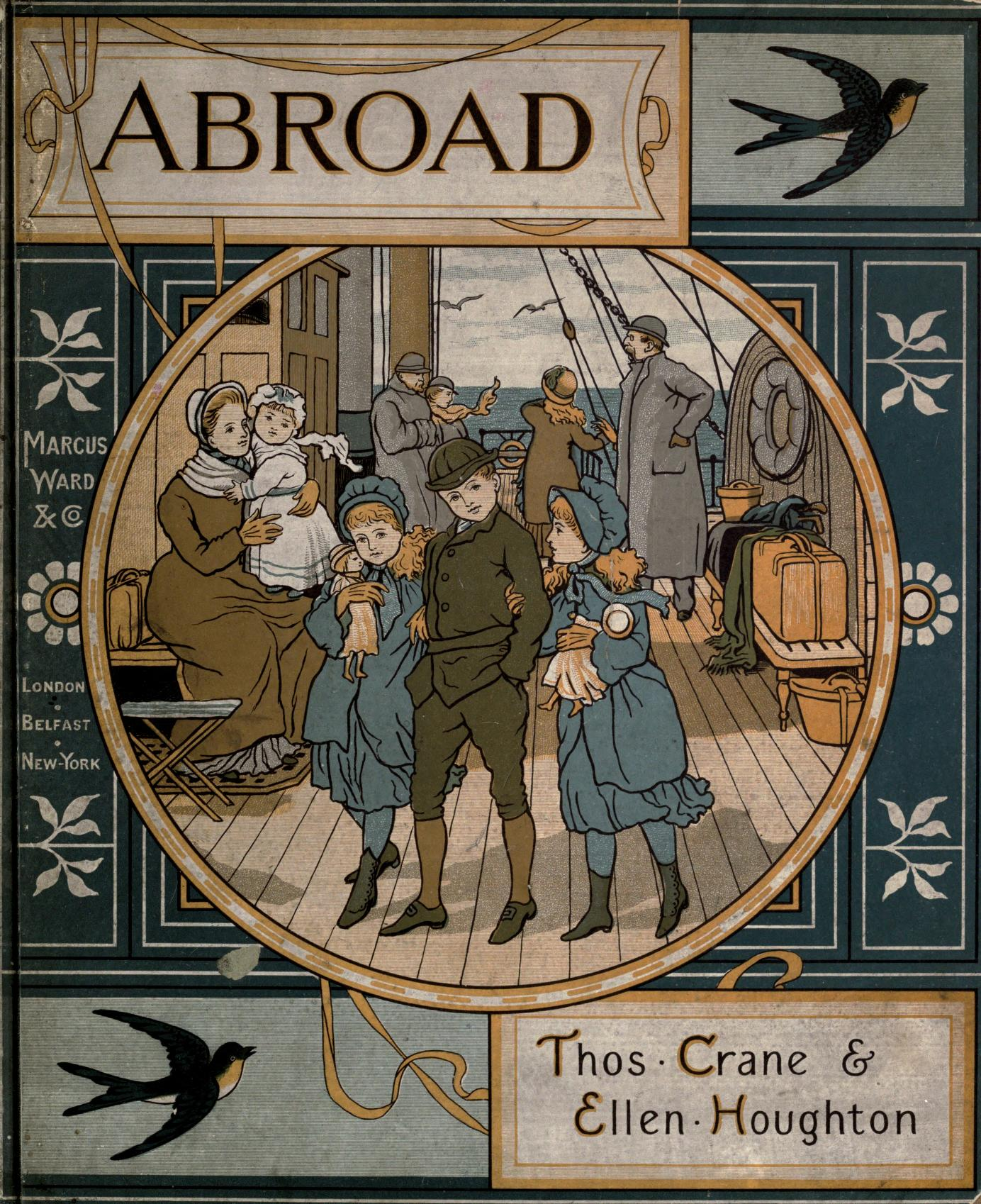
Cover of Abroad (1882)

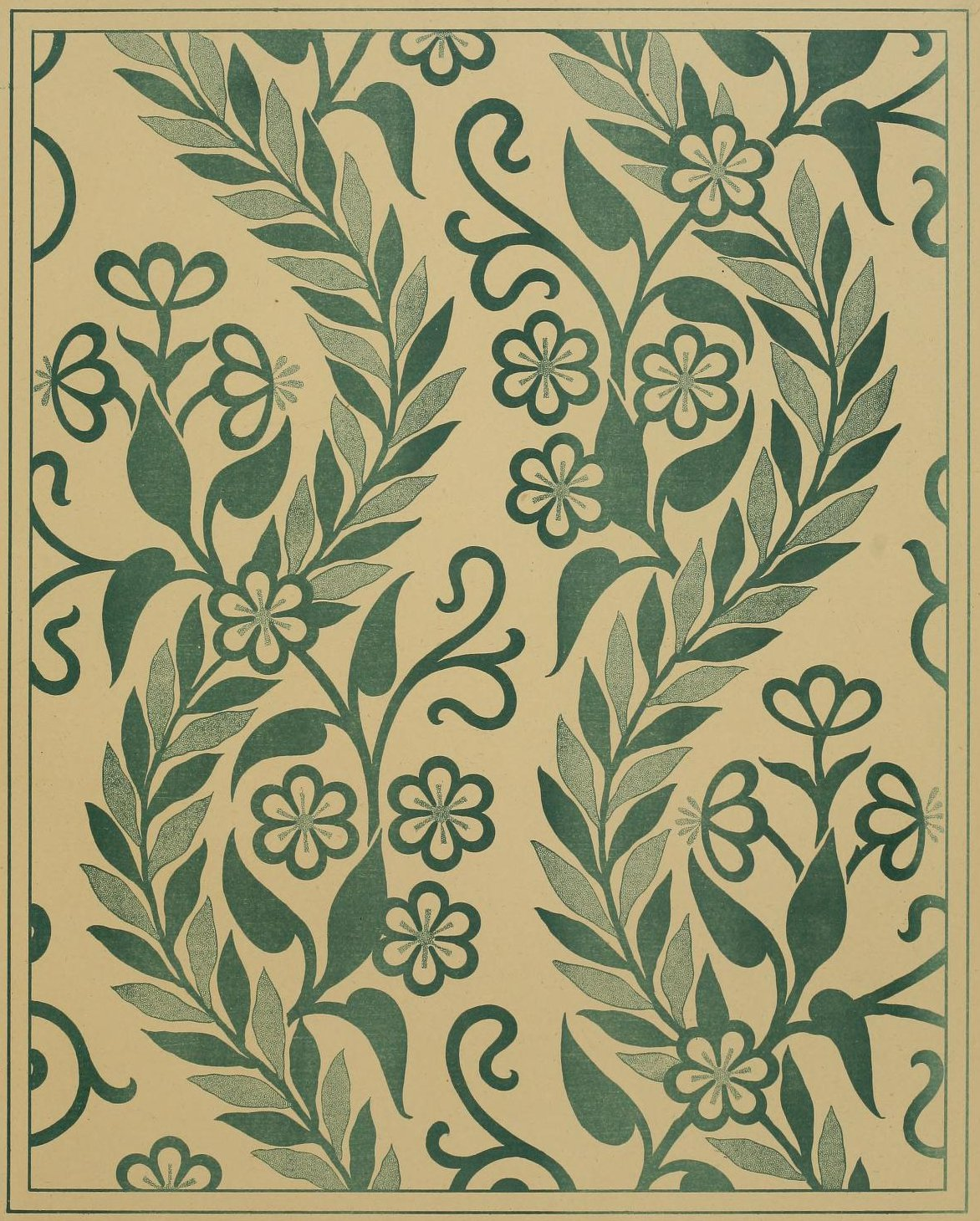
Embroidery design, 1878

Thomas Crane (1843–1903) was an English illustrator and art director at Marcus Ward & Co. known for his colourful children's books and decorative greeting cards which often incorporated floral motifs.

== Life ==
Crane was the eldest son of Thomas Crane (1808–1859), a painter and miniaturist known for his portraits of celebrated figures, and Marie Crane (née Kearsley), the daughter of a prosperous malt-maker. His father's craft and skill influenced the younger Crane, as well as his younger brother Walter Crane, later to become one of the most influential children's illustrators of his generation.

Crane was privately educated in Torquay, after which he was apprenticed to a lawyer, and later worked for several years at the General Post Office before devoting himself to a career in the arts. In the early 1860s and 1870s he designed cloth book-bindings for James Burn & Co. He later became the director of design at the London office of Marcus Ward & Co, where he designed the shopfront and supervised a large output of Christmas cards and books, some of which he also illustrated. During Crane's term as art director, Marcus Ward produced a number of celebrated works by Walter Crane and Kate Greenaway. The Christmas cards of Marcus Ward were well known for their quality, and during the 1800s were desirable among art collectors. Art critic Gleeson White attributed the popularity to Crane's design and supervision. White writes that Crane oversaw "a series of cards which–quite apart from the excellence of their pictures, or floral devices–were embellished by most refined and appropriate ornamentation on their borders and backs. The lettering was not left to chance, or reduced to the bare simplicity of a label in ordinary type... but was planned to accord with it. The colours which distinguish this class of decoration are unusually happy. Pale blue lettering on sage green ground, citrons, olives, and tertiary colours were employed much as they were used by the so-called aesthetic school of furnishers of the same period."

Crane was known for his ornamental work, which included floral designs and embellishments. With Ellen Elizabeth Houghton, a cousin, and John G. Sowerby, he produced a series of acclaimed picture books for children. Among the most celebrated, At Home (1881), Abroad (1882), and At Home Again (1883) were described by librarian scholar Roger Dixon as "among the loveliest books ever produced." He was also among several artists, including William Morris, Edward Burne-Jones, and Walter Crane, hired by the Royal School of Art Needlework to design patterns as part of a revival of art needlework or ornamental embroidery. He and his brother also contributed illustrations to a collection of lectures by their sister Lucy Crane, a writer and scholar of art. In later years he returned to landscape painting, and some of his landscape work was exhibited in the Royal Academy.

After being afflicted by paralysis, Crane died on 27 May 1903 at the age of 59 and was buried in London's Kensal Green Cemetery.

== Books ==
Publications designed by Crane, or including his illustrations, include:

Marcus Ward & Co.

- Art Embroidery: a Treatise on the Revived Practice of Decorative Needlework (1878) by Mary S. Lockwood & Elizabeth Glaister.
- At Home (1881) with J. G. Sowerby
- Abroad (1882) with Ellen Houghton
- At Home Again (1883) with Eliza Keary & J. G. Sowerby
- London Town (1883) with Ellen Houghton
- Calendar of the Months (1884) with Kate Greenway
- Holy Christmas (1896) with Georgie Gaskin

Other publishers

- Needlework (1880) by Elizabeth Glaister. Macmillan & Co
- Art and the Formation of Taste (1882) by Lucy Crane. Macmillan & Co.

== Gallery ==
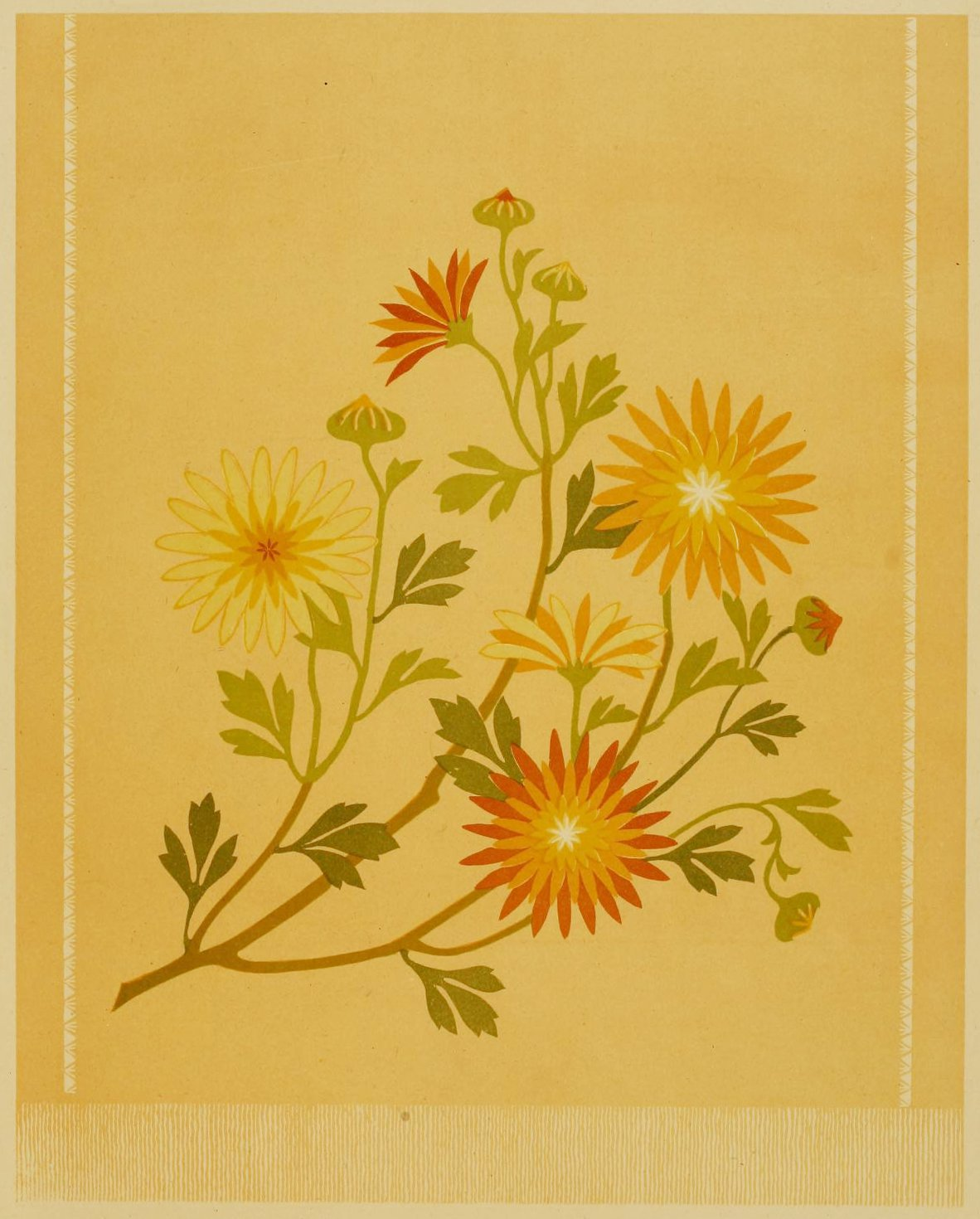
Embroidery design (chrysanthemums) for tidy or chair-back

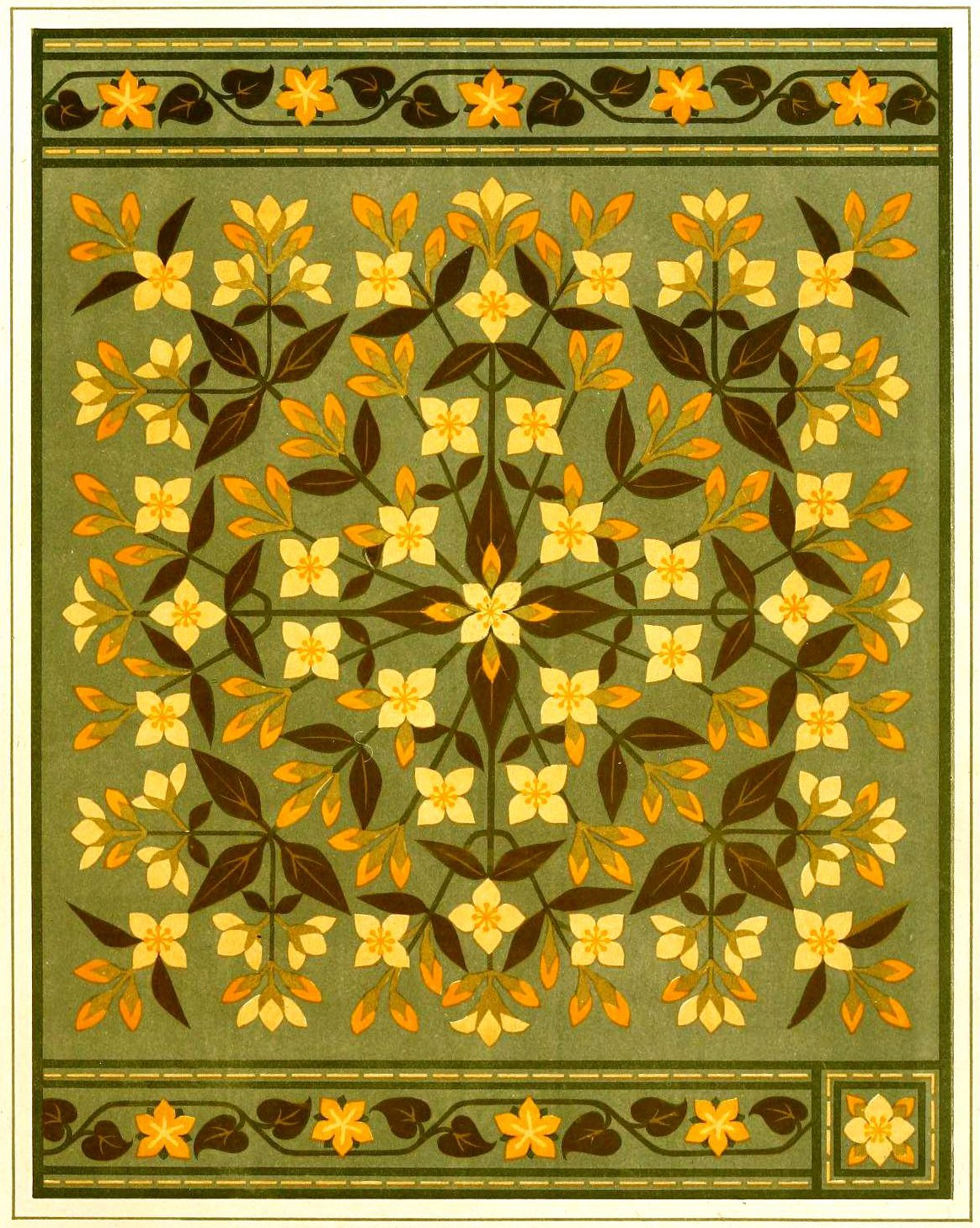
Embroidery design (lilacs) for a cushion

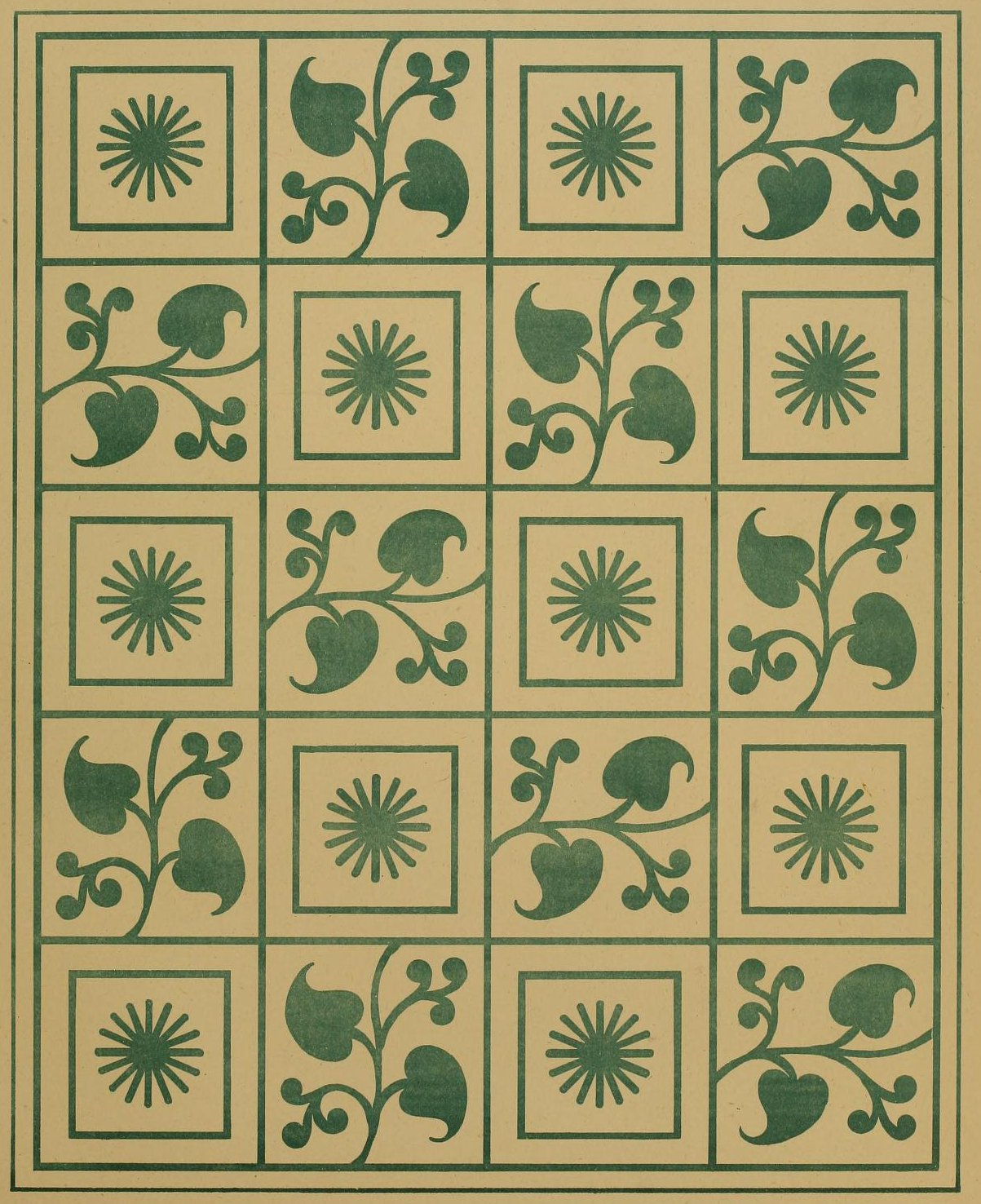
Embroidery design for tea-table cloth

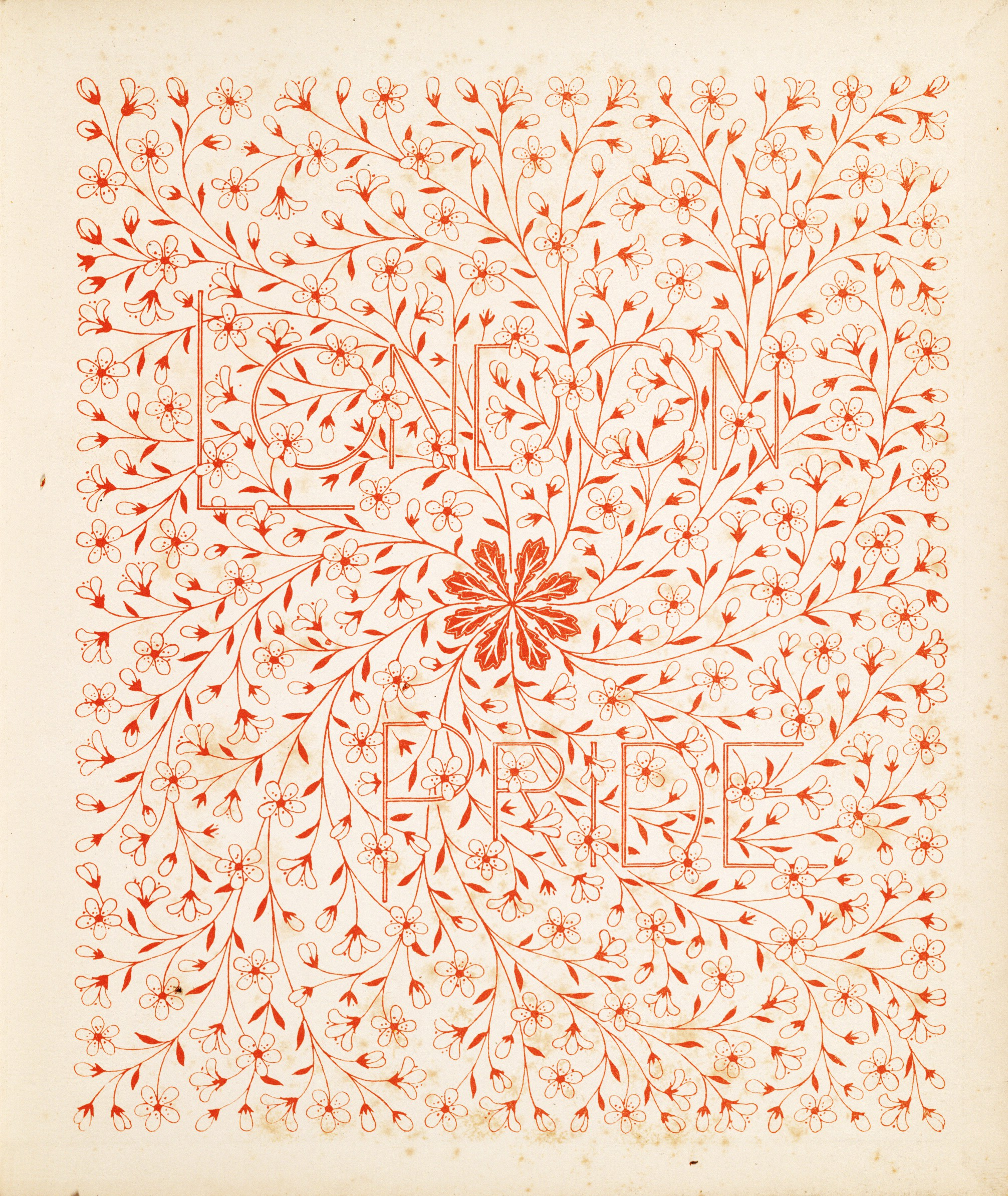
End paper to London Town

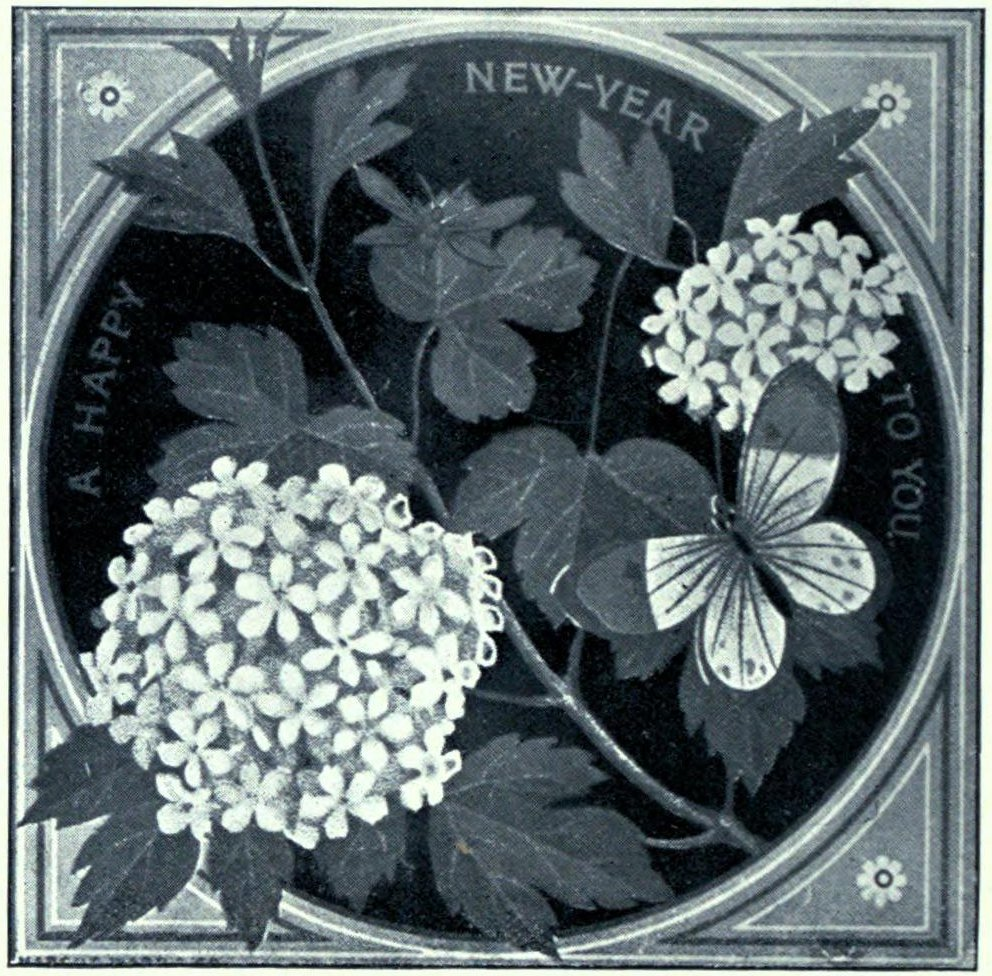
New Years greeting card
