= Lucy Crane =

English writer, art critic and translator

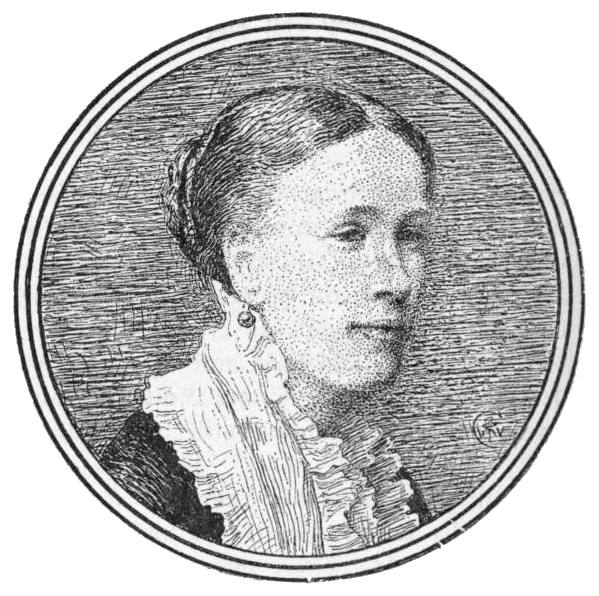
- Portrait by Walter Crane
- Born: 1842; Liverpool, England
- Died: 1882 (aged 39–40)
- Writing career
- Genre: Children's stories

Lucy Crane (1842–1882) was an English writer, art critic and translator. She worked on children's stories and nursery rhymes and lectured in England on fine art.

== Life ==
Crane was born in Liverpool in 1842 as the daughter of the portrait and miniature painter Thomas Crane. Her elder brother Thomas and younger brother Walter both became noted artists. The Crane family moved from Liverpool to Torquay in 1845. Lucy then went to school in London, and in 1859 the family left Torquay for London. From an early age, Crane showed considerable taste and skill in drawing and coloring. Circumstances, however, turned her attention to general educational work and she found employment as a governess. She became an accomplished musician, and was not only distinguished for her delicacy of touch as an executant, but also for the classical refinement of her taste and her knowledge of the earlier Italian and English.

== Work ==
Crane worked on children's nursery rhymes and stories, and she translated the Brothers Grimm's Household Stories collection from German to English in 1882. Interestingly in this work she mistranslated one of the stories. She mistook the German word "Geiß" (another word for goat) as Goose, so here we have the story of the Wolf and the seven Goslings! She also worked with her father, the senior Thomas, and with her brother Walter Crane on a number of projects. She wrote original verses for rhymes such as How Jessie was Lost, The Adventures of Puffy, Annie and Jack in London for Walter's coloured toy-books, some of which were published in Argosy Magazine. The selection and arrangement of the accompaniments to the nursery songs in the Baby's Opera and Baby's Bouquet were also by her.

In the last few years of her life, Crane delivered lectures in London on fine art. Some of her views of art were socialist, and influenced by John Ruskin and Thomas Carlyle. Six of her lectures were published as Art and the Formation of Taste posthumously in 1888 by Macmillan Publishers.

She died on 31 March 1882, at the house of a friend at Bolton le Moors.

== Bibliography ==
- Rumpelstiltskin: A German Folk Tale from the Brothers Grimm (1971), translated by Lucy Crane (Scott, Foresman, 1970) (Illustrated by Kinuko Y. Craft)
