= Walter Crane =

British artist and book illustrator (1845–1915)

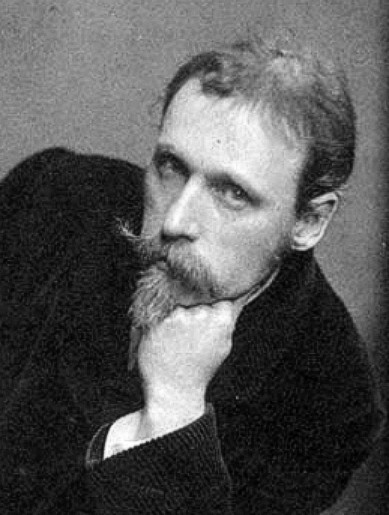
- Walter Crane, c. 1886
- Born: 15 August 1845; Liverpool, Lancashire, England
- Died: 14 March 1915 (aged 69); Horsham, West Sussex, England
- Occupations: Book illustrator; Artist
- Movement: Arts and Crafts movement; Socialist
- Awards: Albert Medal (1904)

Walter Crane (15 August 1845 – 14 March 1915) was an English artist, book illustrator, and prominent advocate for anti-authoritarian democratic socialism among British socialists and in the labour movement of the 19th century. An artistic activist—retroactively classifiable as an "artivist"—Crane produced a large body of both apolitical illustrations for primarily children's literature, though also contemporary (Victorian era) English adult-audience trade-books and general-interest literature, as well as visual works with explicit socio-political messaging.

He is considered to be the most influential, and among the most prolific, children's book designers and illustrators of his generation and, along with Randolph Caldecott and Kate Greenaway, one of the strongest contributors to the child's nursery motif that the genre of English children's illustrated literature would exhibit in its developmental stages in the late 19th century.

Crane's work featured some of the more colourful and detailed beginnings of the child-in-the-garden motifs that would characterize many nursery rhymes and children's stories for decades to come. He was part of the Arts and Crafts movement and produced an array of paintings, illustrations, children's books, ceramic tiles, wallpapers and other decorative arts. Crane is also remembered for his creation of a number of iconic images associated with the international socialist movement.

A member of Britain's first organized Marxist group, the Social Democratic Federation (SDF), Crane's socio-political views evolved over time, and he variously promoted social liberalism, radical liberalism, liberal socialism, "evolutionary socialism", Fabianism, and democratic socialism.

== Biography ==
=== Early life and influences ===
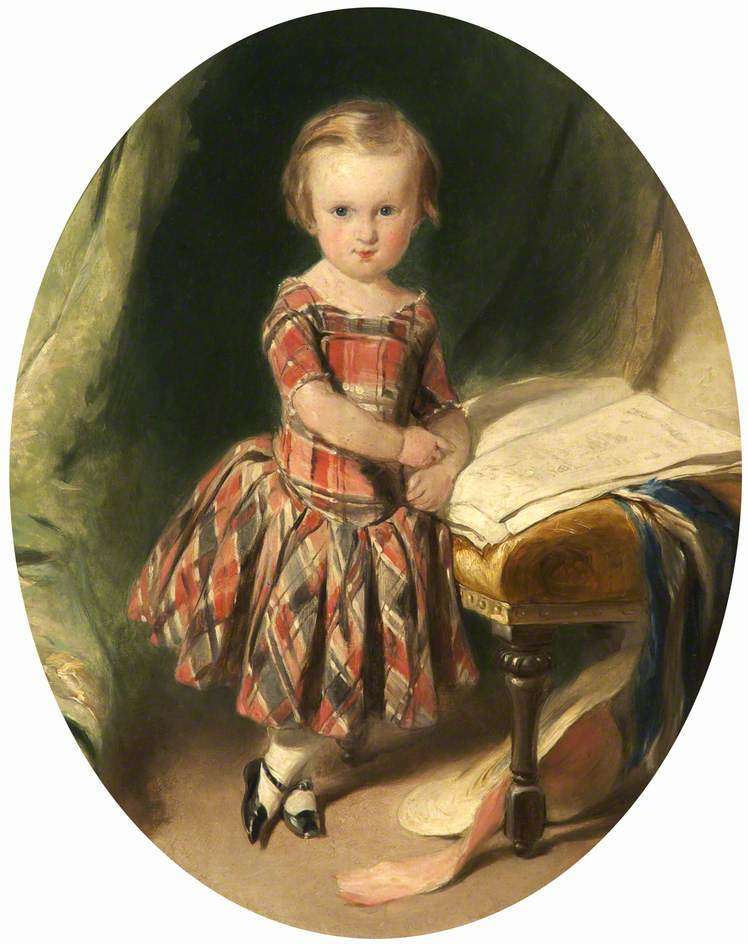
Portrait of young Walter Crane painted by his father

Crane was the second son of Thomas Crane, a portrait painter and miniaturist, and Marie Crane (née Kearsley), the daughter of a prosperous malt-maker. His elder brother Thomas would also go into illustration, and sister Lucy was a noted writer. He was a fluent follower of the newer art movements and he came to study and appreciate the detailed senses of the Pre-Raphaelite Brotherhood, and was also a diligent student of the renowned artist and critic John Ruskin. A set of coloured page designs to illustrate Tennyson's "Lady of Shalott" gained the approval of wood-engraver William James Linton to whom Walter Crane was apprenticed for three years in 1859–62. As a wood-engraver he had abundant opportunity for the minute study of the contemporary artists whose work passed through his hands, of Pre-Raphaelites Dante Gabriel Rossetti and John Everett Millais, as well as Sir John Tenniel, the illustrator of Alice in Wonderland, and Frederick Sandys. He was a student who admired the masters of the Italian Renaissance, however he was more influenced by the Elgin Marbles in the British Museum. A further and important element in the development of his talent was the study of Japanese colour-prints, the methods of which he imitated in a series of toy books, which started a new fashion.

=== Political activity ===
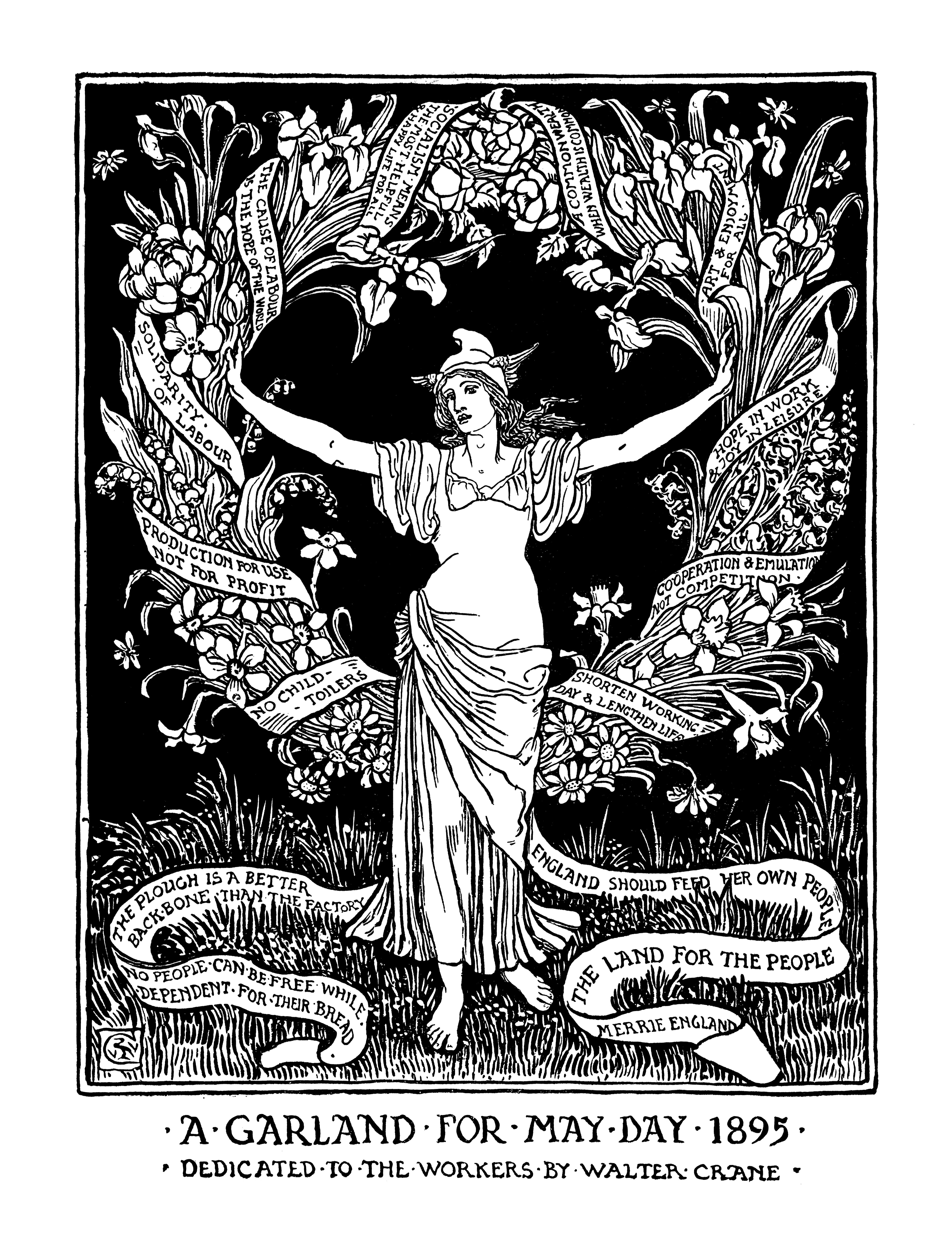
"A Garland for May Day 1895" woodcut

From the early 1880s, initially under William Morris's influence, Crane was closely associated with the socialist movement. He did as much as Morris himself to bring art into the daily life of all classes. With this object in view he devoted much attention to designs for textiles and wallpapers, and to house decoration; but he also used his art for the direct advancement of the Socialist cause. As a member of the Socialist League, he created the 1885 cover illustration for their manifesto. For a long time he provided the weekly cartoons for the socialist organs Justice, Commonweal and The Clarion. Many of these were collected as Cartoons for the Cause.

Crane also devoted much time and energy to non-political societies, such as the Art Workers Guild, of which he was master in 1888 and 1889 and to the Arts and Crafts Exhibition Society, which he helped to found in 1888. He was a Vice President of the Healthy and Artistic Dress Union, a movement begun in 1890, whose aim was to promote loose-fitting clothing, in opposition to "stiffness, tightness and weight". They produced numerous pamphlets setting out their cause, including one entitled "How to Dress Without a Corset" which Crane illustrated.

Although not himself an anarchist, Crane contributed to several libertarian publishers, including Liberty Press and Freedom Press. He is credited with the design and decoration of the front façade of "The Bomb Shop", Henderson's bookshop at 66 Charing Cross Road specializing in left-wing and radical literature.

Crane was controversial in his support of the four Chicago anarchists executed in 1887 in connection with the Haymarket affair. Visiting the United States for the first time in connection with an exhibition of his work in 1891, Crane scandalized polite society by appearing at a Boston anarchist meeting and expressing the opinion that the Haymarket defendants had been put to death wrongfully. Returning to his hotel, Crane found a letter stating that he faced "hopeless ruin" among American patrons of the arts owing to his support of those who were commonly considered to be terrorist conspirators in public opinion of the day. Financial support was withdrawn and planned dinners in Crane's honour were cancelled. In response to the controversy, Crane wrote a letter to the press explaining that he had not meant to cause insult and did not himself favour the use of explosives, but had merely been expressing his principled opinion that those convicted were innocent of the crime for which they were charged. The incident was memorialized in the press as "probably the most dramatic episode" in the artist's career. Crane publicly criticised the British government for the Second Boer War and joined the Stop the War Committee.

=== Personal life ===
Walter Crane married embroiderer Mary Frances Andrews in 1871 and they proceeded on a two-year honeymoon. In Italy, the newlyweds made contact with artists from other countries, while Crane's illustrations were published in England. The couple went on to have three children with Crane featuring himself, his wife and one of their sons in his 1885 watercolour, The Apotheosis of Italian Art. Both he and his wife enjoyed giving enormous costume parties, so that the couple's New Year parties were considered a major event in London's artistic social calendar. Late in 1914, at the age of 68, Frances Crane went on a rest cure in Kingsnorth, Kent, but committed suicide in a tragic train incident. The coroner's jury ruled it to be a case of temporary insanity.

=== Death and legacy ===
Walter Crane died on 14 March 1915 in Horsham Hospital, West Sussex, three months after his wife. His body was cremated at the Golders Green Crematorium, where his ashes remain. He was survived by their three children, Beatrice, Lionel and Lancelot.

== Artistic work ==
=== Paintings and illustrations ===
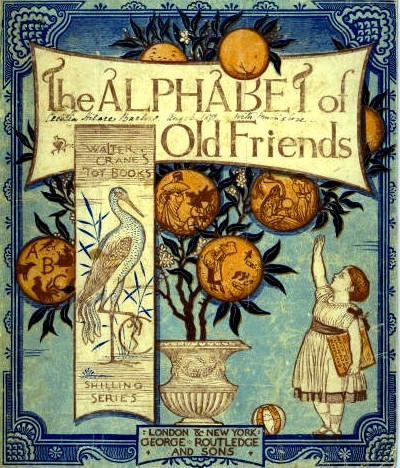
Crane's interest in Japanese art is evident in this 1874 cover of a toy book, printed by Edmund Evans.

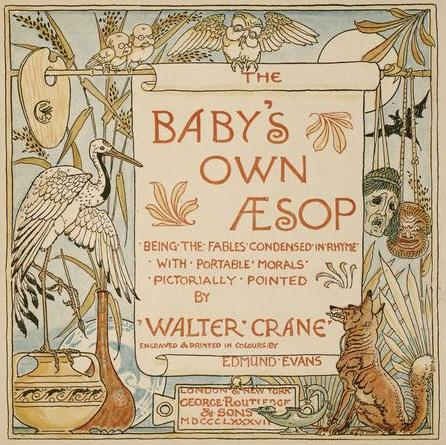
Title page of Baby’s Own Aesop by Walter Crane, London, 1887

In 1862, his picture The Lady of Shalott was exhibited at the Royal Academy, but the academy steadily refused his maturer work and after the opening of the Grosvenor Gallery in 1877, he ceased to send pictures to Burlington House. In 1863 the printer Edmund Evans employed Crane to illustrate yellowbacks, and in 1865 they began to collaborate on toy books of nursery rhymes and fairy tales. From 1865 to 1876 Crane and Evans produced two to three toy books each year.

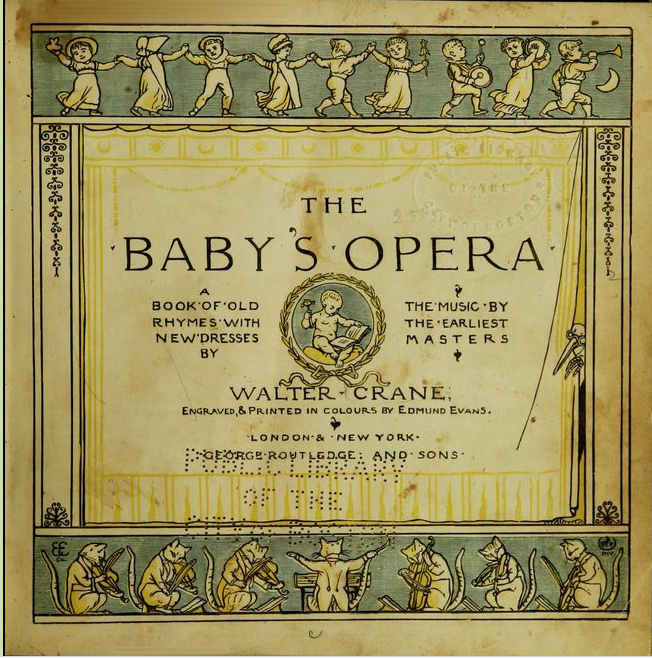
The Baby's Opera, a book of old rhymes and the music by the earliest masters book cover 1

These are a few of his illustration suites: In 1864 he began to illustrate a series of sixpenny toy books of nursery rhymes in three colours for Edmund Evans. He was allowed more freedom in a series beginning with The Frog Prince (1874) which showed markedly the influence of Japanese art, and of a long visit to Italy following on his marriage in 1871. His work was characterized by sharp outlines and flat tints. The Baby's Opera was a book of English nursery songs available in 1877 with Evans, and a third series of children's books with the collective title Romance of the Three R's provided a regular course of instruction in art for the nursery. In his early "Lady of Shalott", the artist had shown his preoccupation with unity of design in book illustration by printing in the words of the poem himself, in the view that this union of the calligrapher's and the decorator's art was one secret of the beauty of the old illuminated books.

He followed the same course in The First of May: A Fairy Masque by his friend John Wise, text and decoration being in this case reproduced by photogravure. The Goose Girl illustration taken from his beautiful Household Stories from Grimm (1882) was done again as a big watercolour and then reproduced in tapestry by William Morris. Flora's Feast, A Masque of Flowers had lithographic reproductions of Crane's line drawings washed in with watercolour; he also decorated in colour The Wonder Book of Nathaniel Hawthorne, and Margaret Deland's Old Garden. During the eighties and nineties he illustrated 16 children's novels by Mrs. Molesworth in black and white. In 1894 he collaborated with William Morris in the page decoration of The Story of the Glittering Plain, published at the Kelmscott Press, which was executed in the style of 16th-century Italian and German woodcuts. Crane illustrated editions of Edmund Spenser's Faerie Queene (19 pts., 1894–1896) and The Shepheard's Calendar, as well as Ali Baba and the Forty Thieves (1873), The Happy Prince and Other Stories by Oscar Wilde (1888), an edition of Arthurian Legends, A Flower Wedding. and in 1900 Judge Parry's re-narration of Cervantes' Don Quixote of the Mancha.

Crane also illustrated Nellie Dale's books On Teaching English Reading, Steps to Reading, First Primer, Second Primer, Infant Reader, Book I, and Book II. These were most probably completed between 1898 and 1907.

=== Poetry ===
Crane wrote and illustrated three books of poetry, Queen Summer (1891), Renascence (1891), and The Sirens Three (1886).

=== Stained glass ===
Crane's earliest stained glass window designs were some American commissions with glass made by William Morris. He then had a British commission – the windows for the new Agapemonite church of the Ark of the Covenant in London. These designs are a mixture of Art Nouveau floral works on the side windows and depictions of sin, shame and the translations of Enoch and Elijah. They were completed by Sylvester Sparrow and have been described by English Heritage as Crane's "most significant work in this medium", and in the justification for listing the church as Grade II* "the stained glass is extraordinary and has more than special interest in the context of Arts and Crafts stained glass".

=== Mature work ===
His own easel pictures, chiefly allegorical in subject, among them The Bridge of Life (1884) and The Mower (1891), were exhibited regularly at the Grosvenor Gallery and later at the New Gallery. Neptune's Horses was exhibited at the New Gallery in 1893, and with it may be classed his Rainbow and the Wave.

His varied work includes examples of plaster relief, tiles, stained glass, pottery, wallpaper, and textile designs, in all of which he applied the principle that in purely decorative design "the artist works freest and best without direct reference to nature, and should have learned the forms he makes use of by heart". An exhibition of his work of different kinds was held at the Fine Art Society's galleries in Bond Street in 1891, and taken to the United States in the same year by the artist himself. It was afterwards exhibited in Germany, Austria and Scandinavia.

Crane was elected a member of the Institute of Painters in Water Colours in 1882, resigning in 1886; two years later he became an associate of the Water Colour Society (1888); he was an examiner for the Science and Art Department at the South Kensington Museum; director of design at the Manchester Municipal School (1894); art director of Reading College (1896); and in 1898 for a short time principal of the Royal College of Art, where he planned a new curriculum intended to bring students into closer contact with tools and materials. His lectures at Manchester were published with illustrated drawings as The Bases of Design (1898) and Line and Form (1900). The Decorative Illustration of Books, Old and New (2nd ed., London and New York, 1900) is a further contribution to theory. A well-known portrait of Crane by George Frederick Watts was exhibited at the New Gallery in 1893.

In 1887, Crane was commissioned by Emilie Barrington to paint a series of murals to decorate the newly constructed Red Cross Hall in Southwark, a project conceived by the housing campaigner Octavia Hill. Crane produced designs for nine panels, which were displayed at the 1890 Arts and Crafts Exhibition Society show. Ultimately, only three designs were converted into full-size murals, these being: Alice Ayres (1890), depicting the heroine of the Union Street fire which had occurred in 1885 just a few streets away; Jamieson (1892), depicting two Scottish railway workers, Alex Jamieson and his nephew Alexander, who lost their lives in 1874 while working on the Glasgow and Paisley line; and Rescue from a Well (1894), depicting George Eales, a 58-year-old labourer who in December 1887 at Dummer, near Basingstoke in Hampshire, descended into a well to rescue a five-year-old child. After 1894, no further murals were created, partly due to shortages in funding and other commitments, but also because it was discovered that the gas lighting in the hall was damaging the paintings. The Red Cross Hall is now in private hands and the status of the murals is unknown.

A large mosaic, The Sphere and Message of Art, designed by Crane, was intended for the façade of the Whitechapel Art Gallery at the time of its construction in 1898. Sadly, sufficient funds were not forthcoming, resulting instead in a frontage clad in buff terracotta tiles. (The drawing still exists.)

Crane was much admired in Hungary and in 1900 Radisics Jenő, the director of the Budapest Museum of Applied Arts, organised a retrospective of his work there. Crane visited the city in the autumn, was feted, gave lectures and visited Transylvania. He went to Kolozsvár (now Cluj-Napoca), Bánffyhunyad (now Huedin), and Kalotaszeg (now Țara Călatei) in search of Hungarian traditional art. He recorded the visit in Ideals in Art. Zsuzsa Gonda in her review of Crane’s visit says that it is one of the most extensively documented events in the artistic life of the country in that period. The welcome extended to him was not entirely personal, however: he was the representative of England, the nation that sheltered Kossuth and took him to its heart.

One of Crane's last major works was his lunettes at the Royal West of England Academy, which were painted in 1913.

== Gallery ==
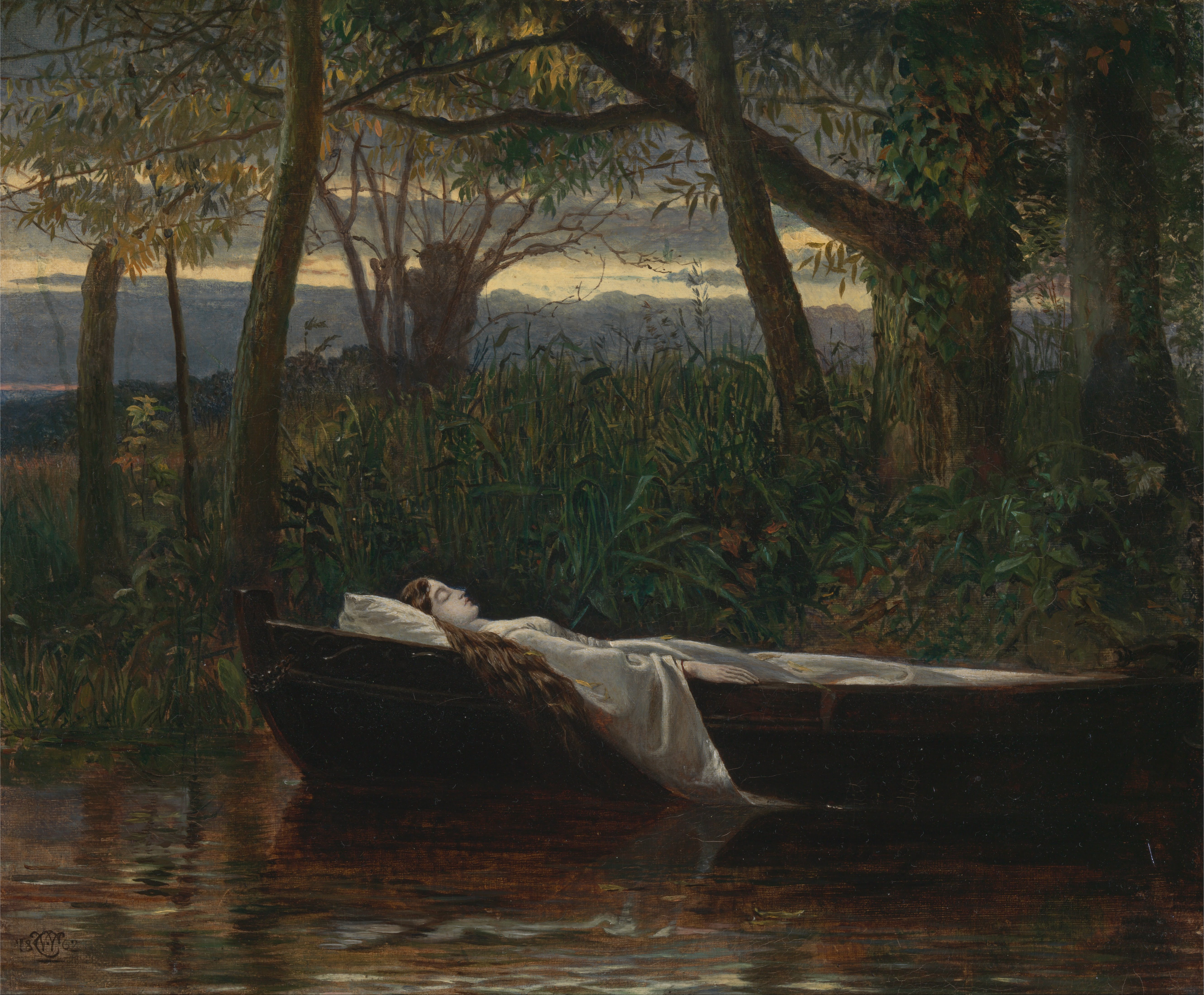
The Lady of Shalott,
oil on canvas, 1862

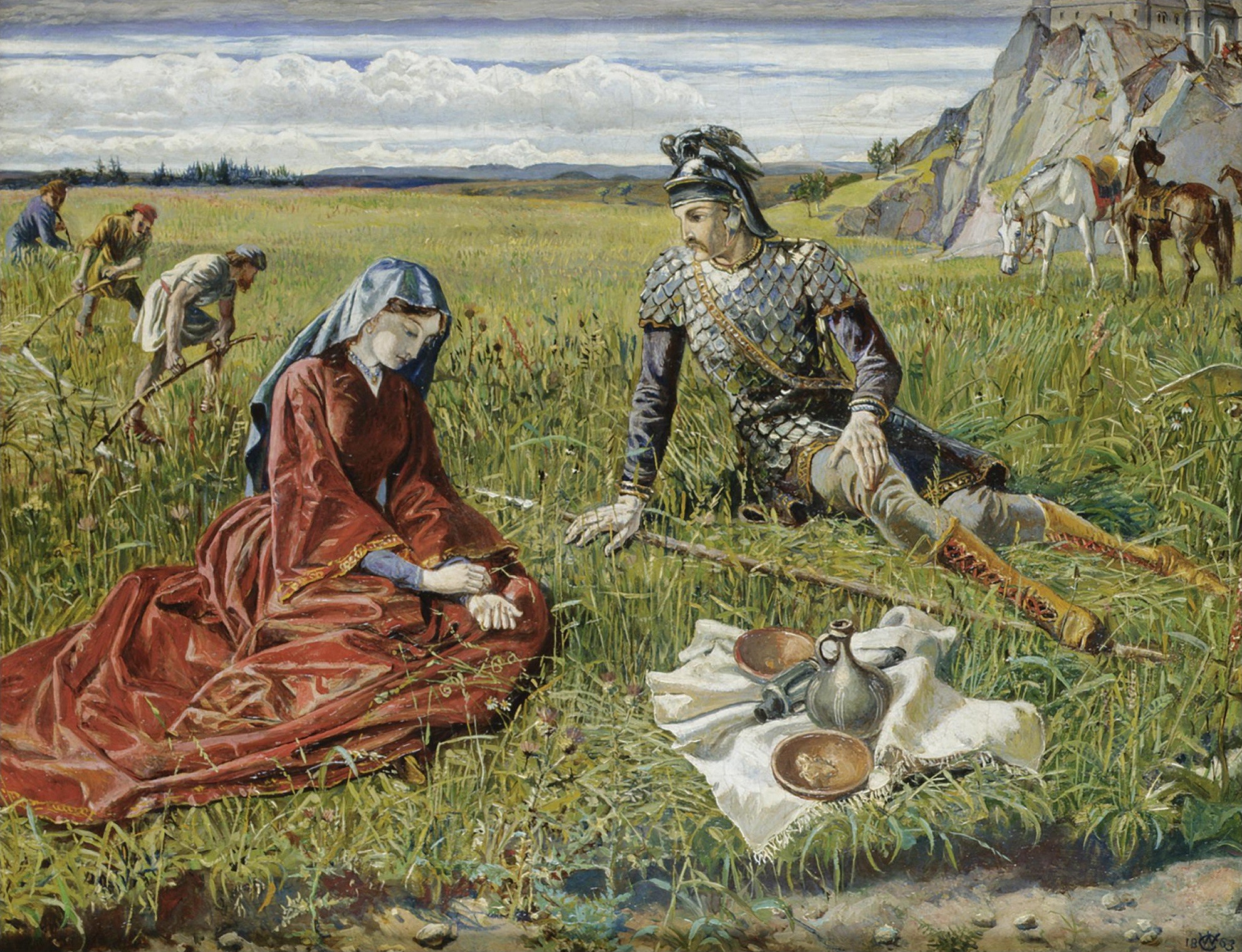
Ruth and Boaz, oil on canvas, 1863

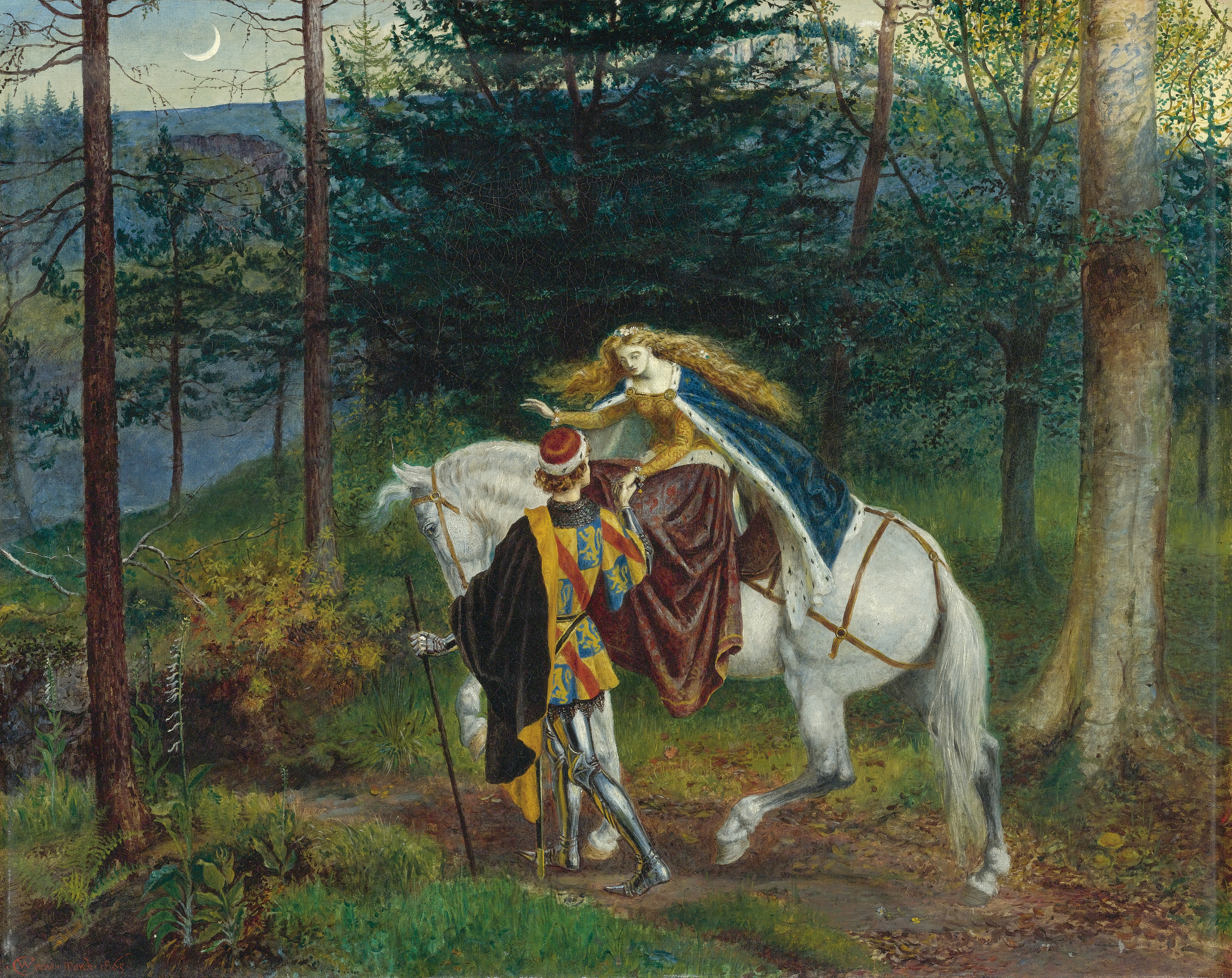
La belle Dame Sans Merci, oil on canvas, 1865

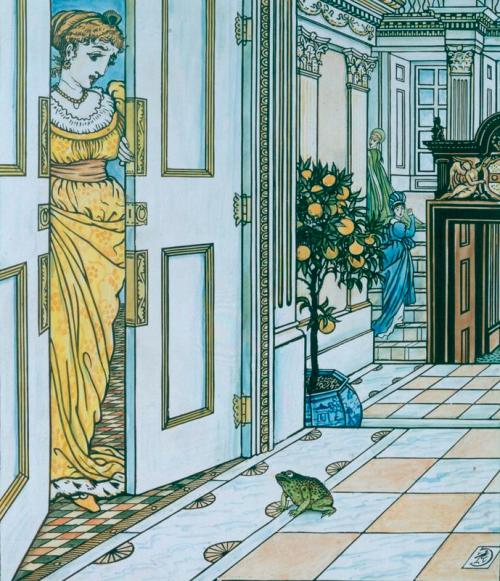
The Frog Asks To Be Allowed To Enter The Castle – Illustration for the Frog Prince, 1874

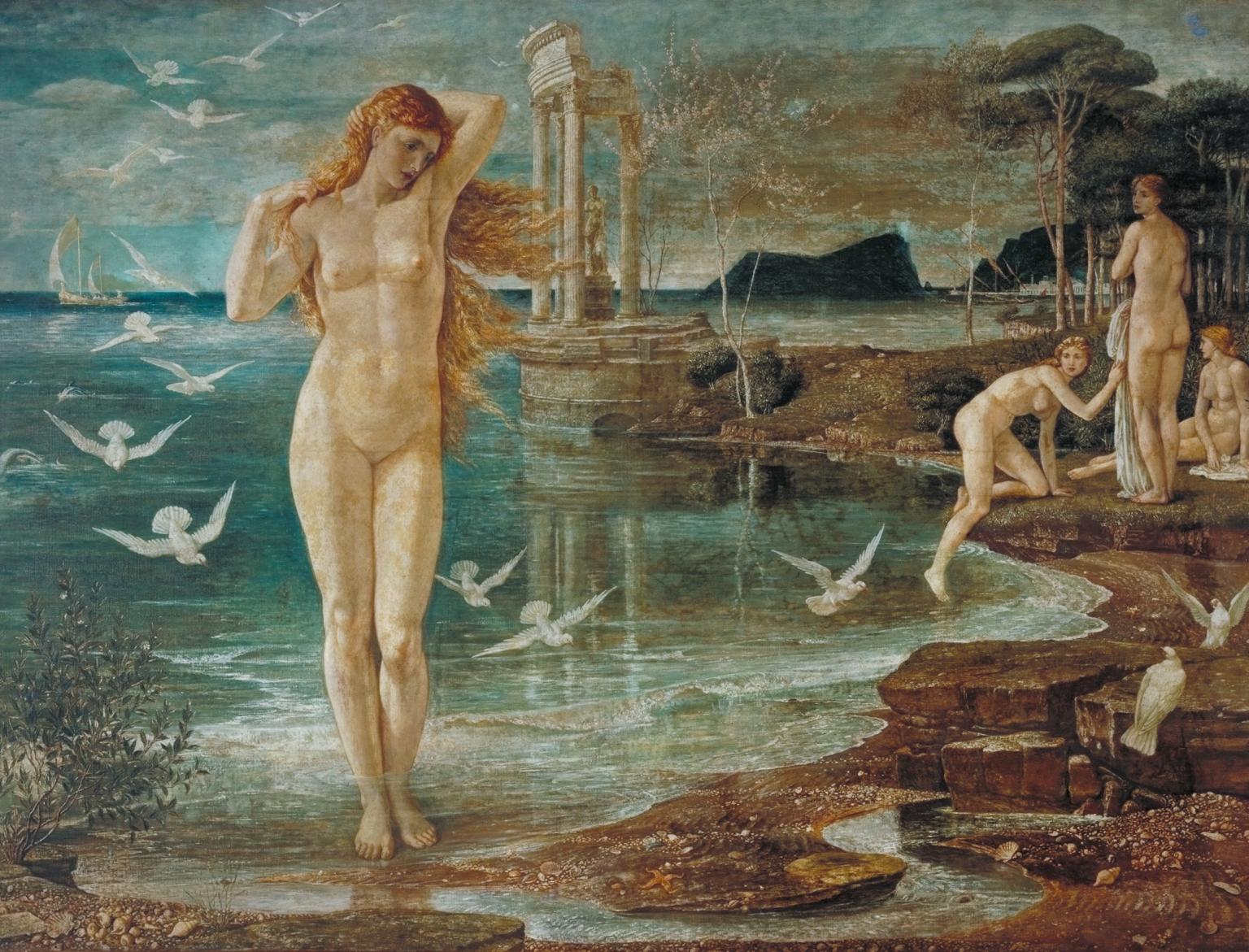
The Renaissance of Venus, tempera on canvas,1877

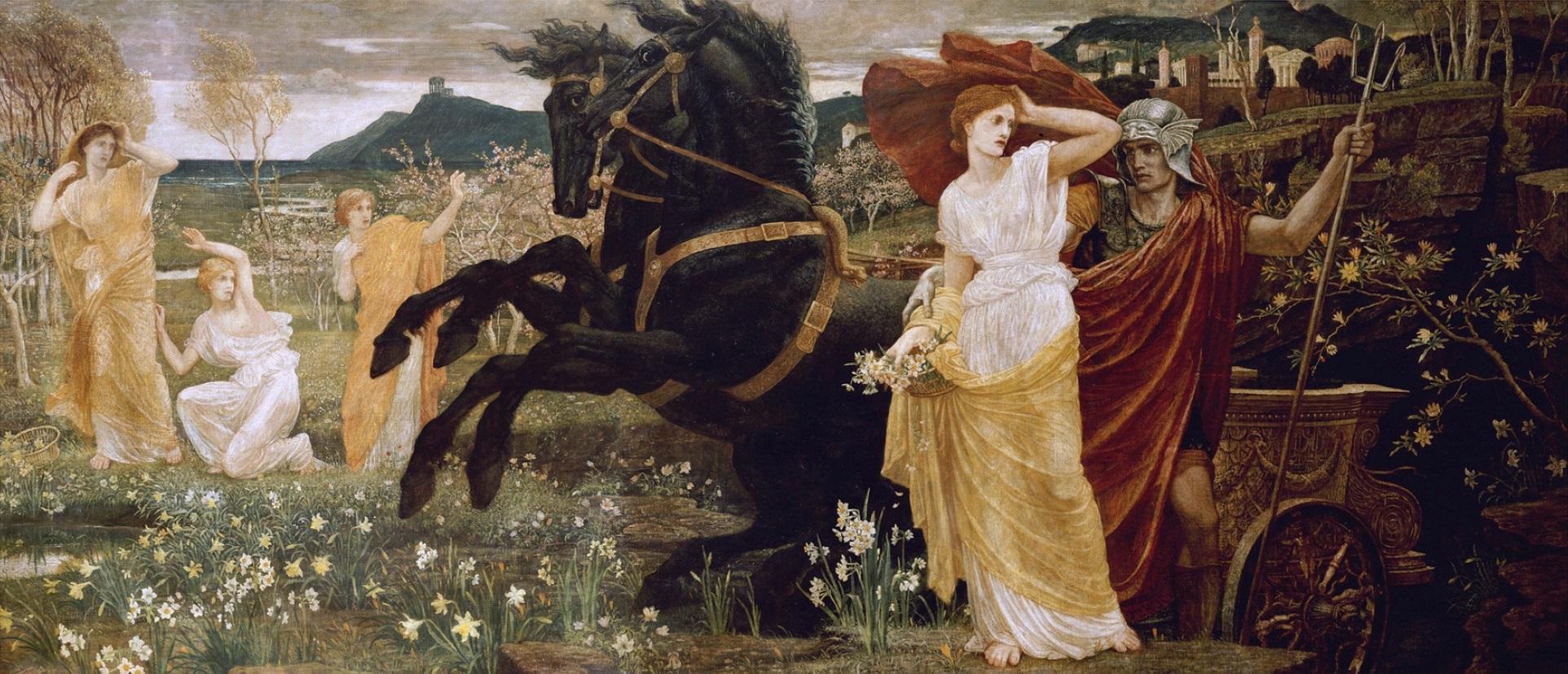
The Fate of Persephone,
oil and tempera on canvas, 1877

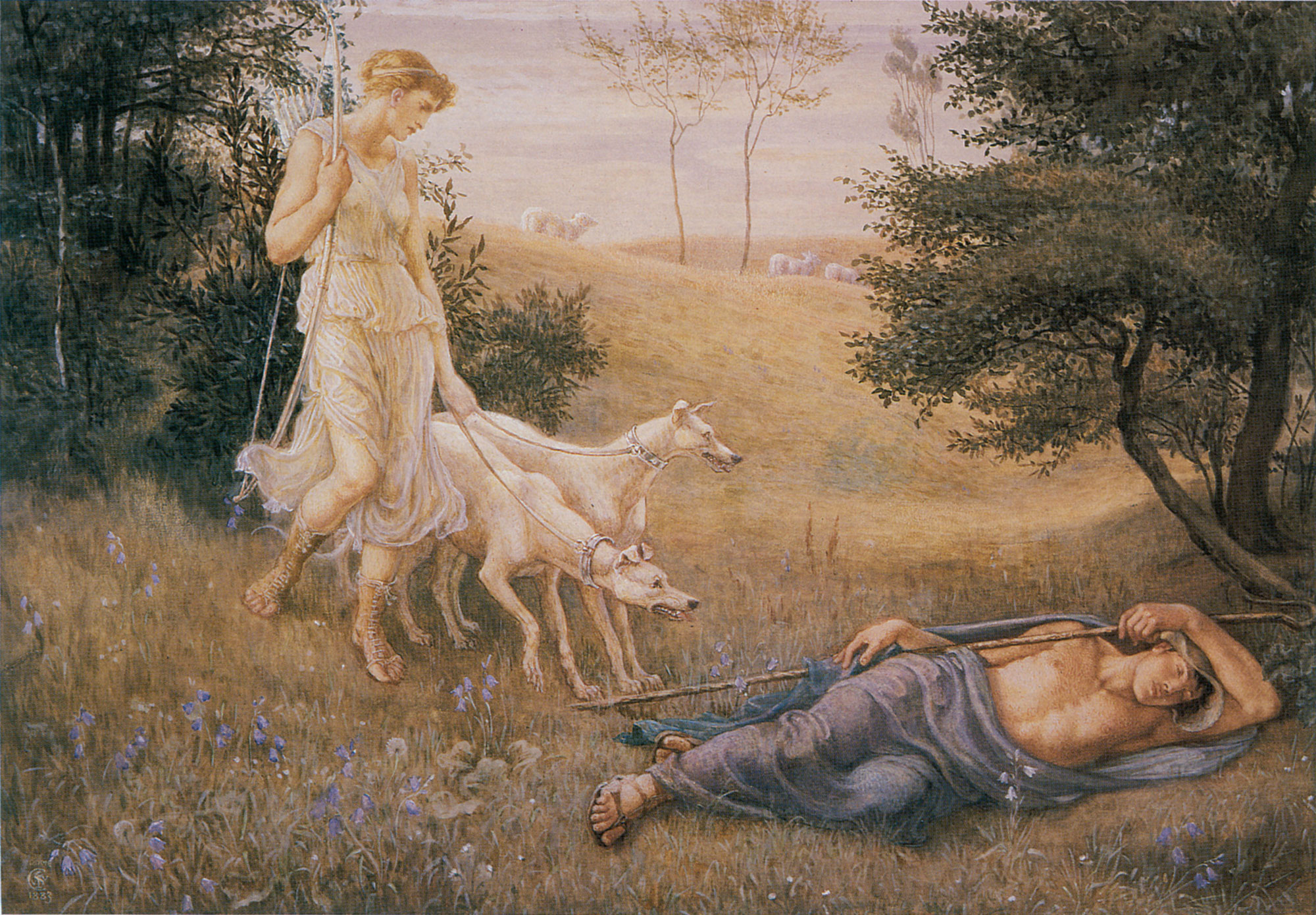
Diana and Endymion, watercolour and gouache, 1883

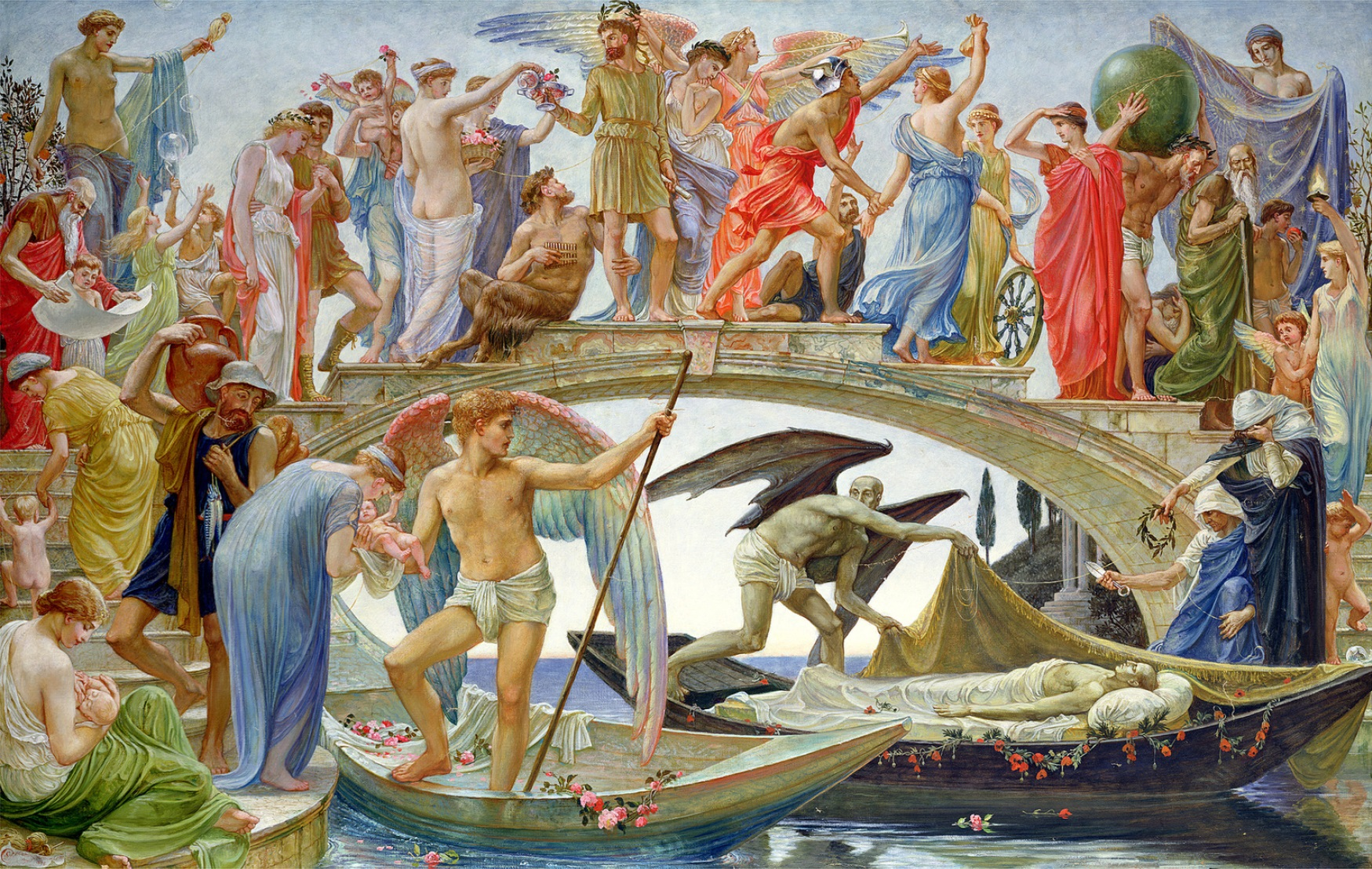
The Bridge of Life,
oil on canvas, 1884

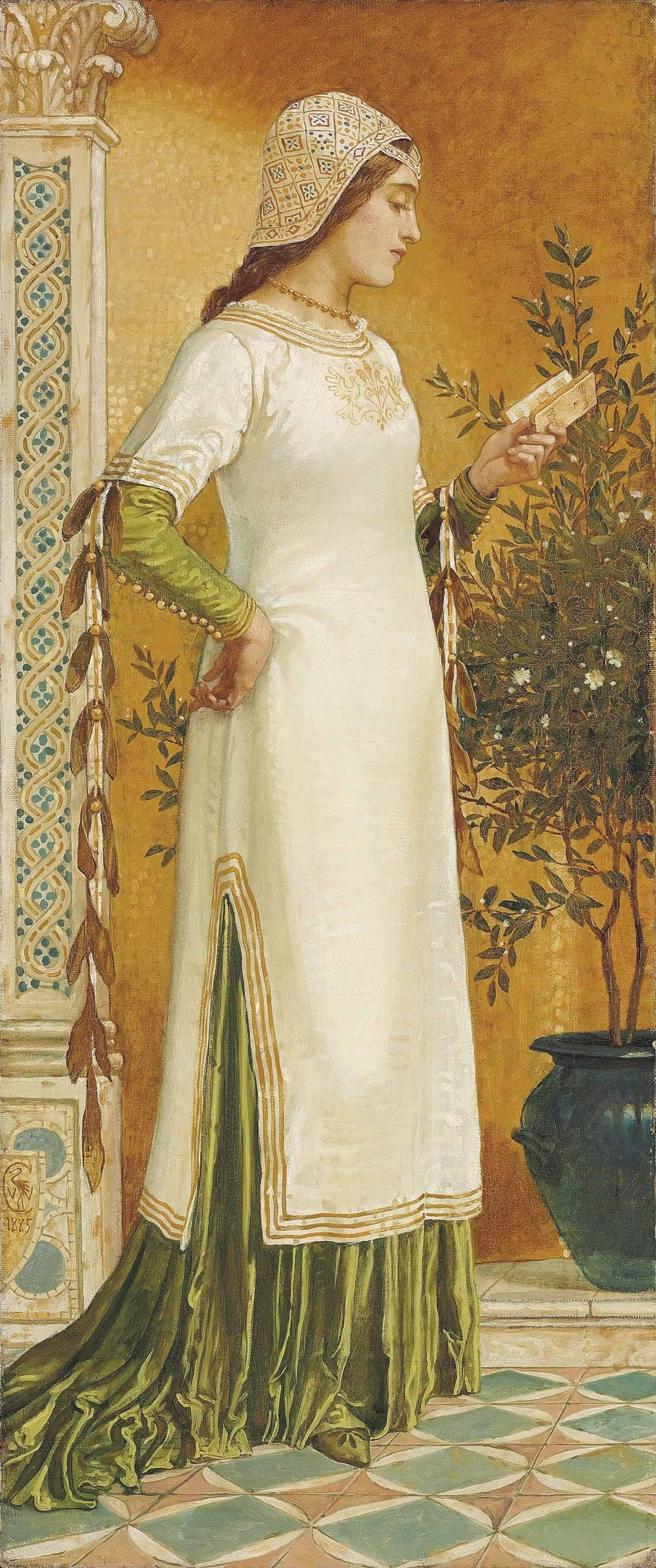
Laura Reading,
oil on canvas, 1885

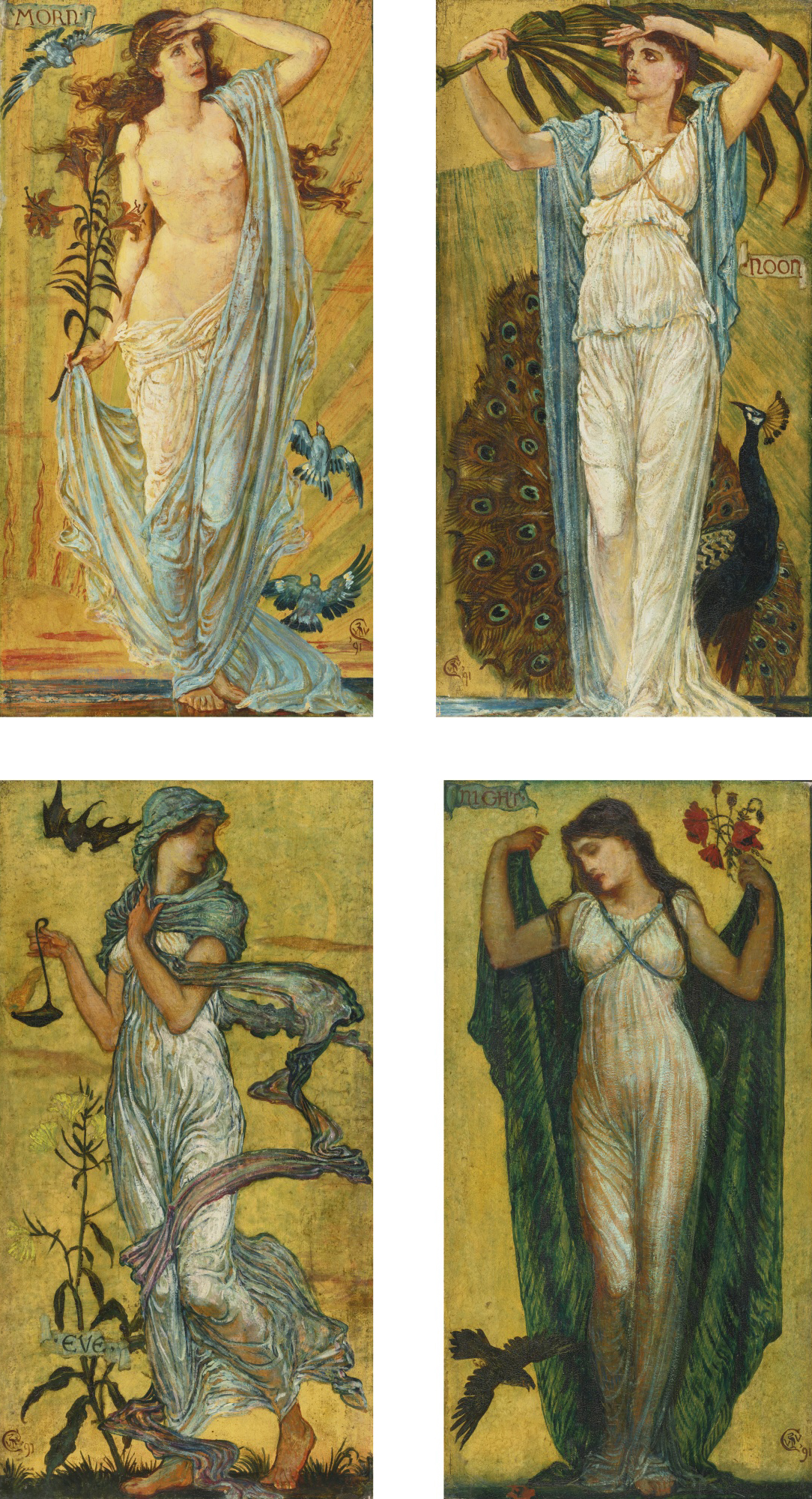
Morn, Noon, Eve, Night,
oil on panel, 1891

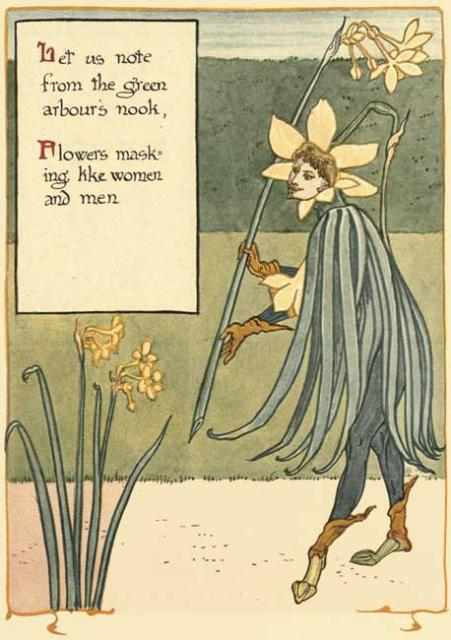
The flowers masquerade as people. Sir Jonquil begins the fun, illustration from A Floral Fantasy in an Old English Garden, 1899

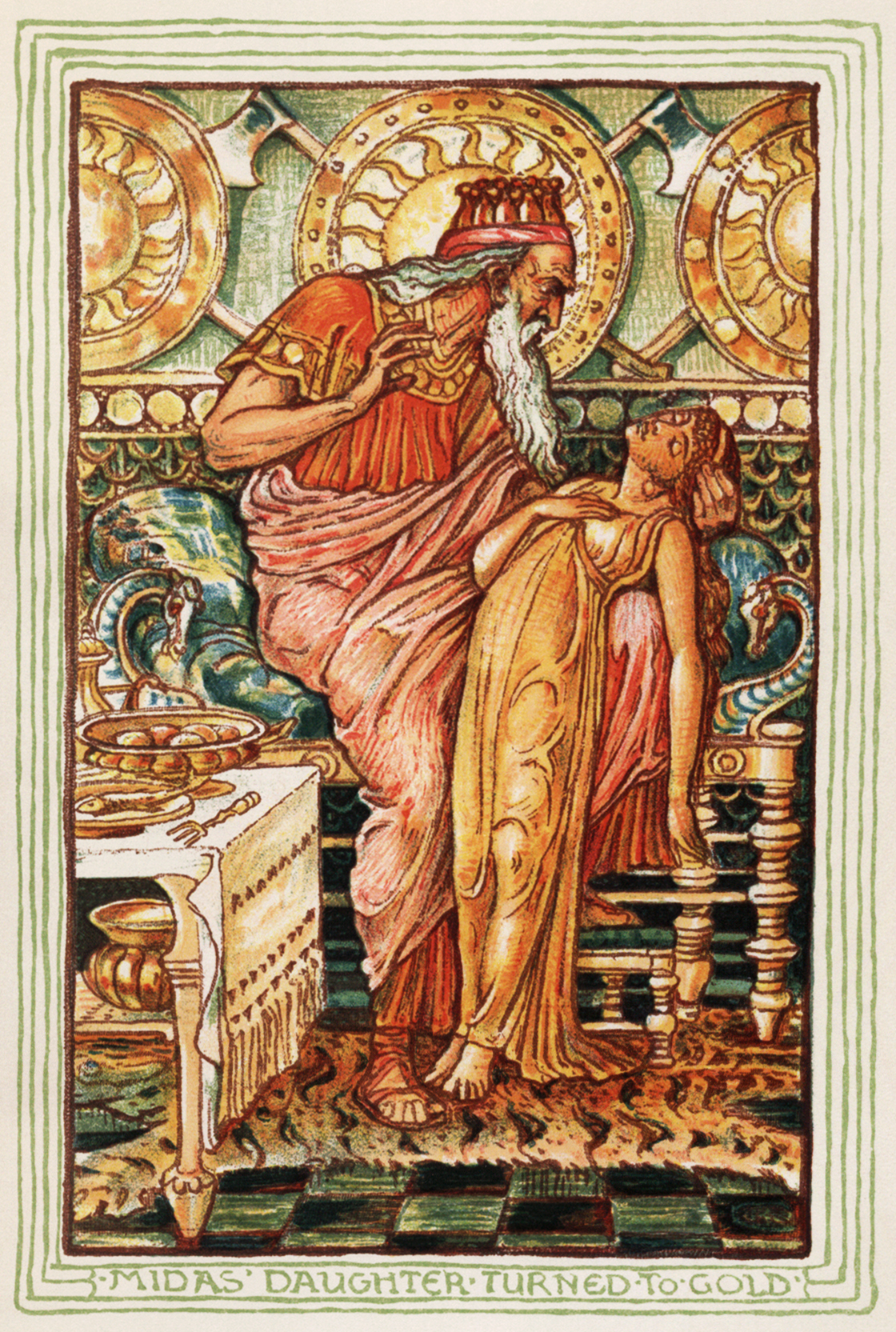
King Midas with his daughter, from Nathaniel Hawthorne's 1893 edition of A Wonder-Book for Girls and Boys

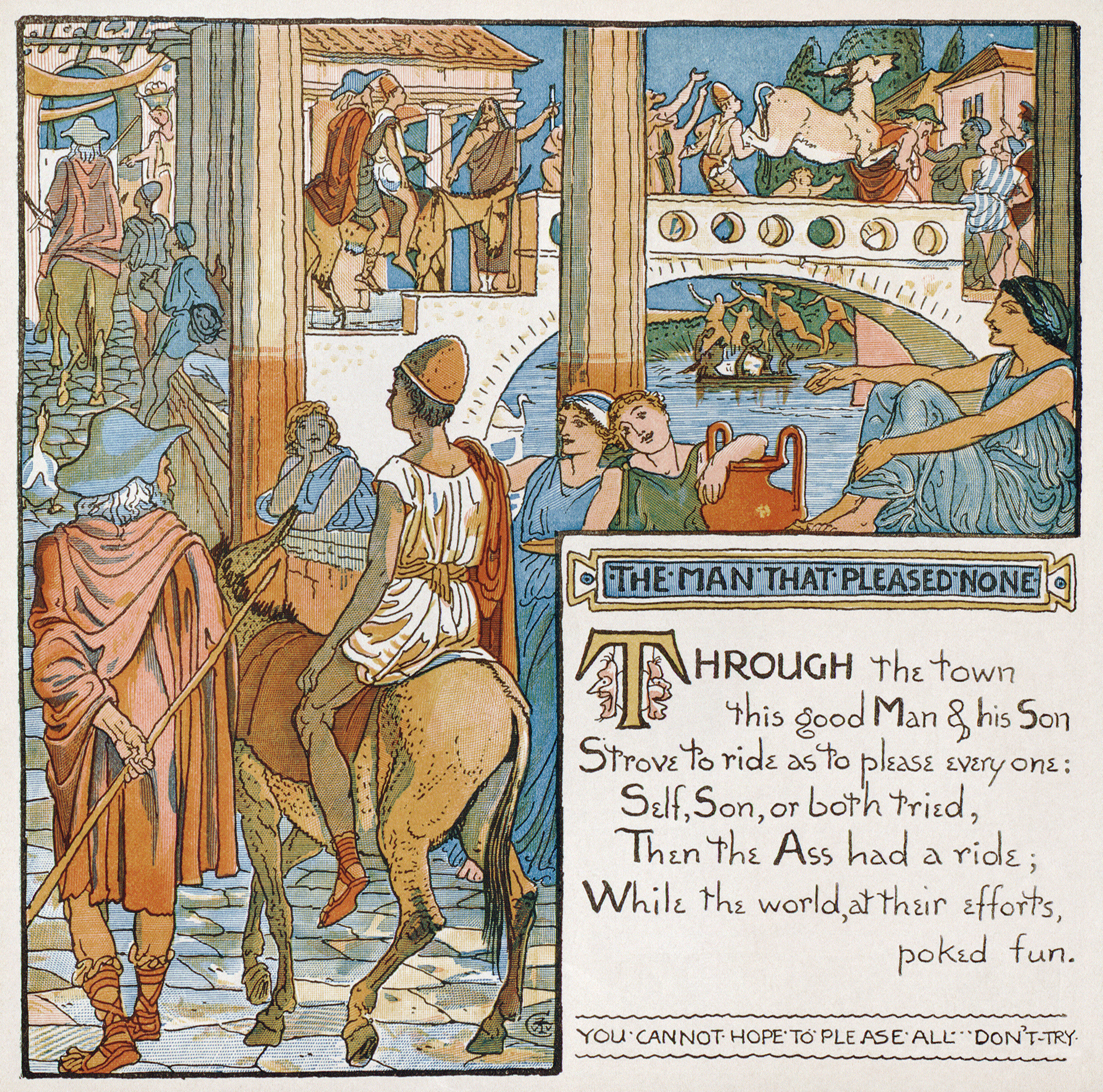
Illustration for The Man That Pleased None from Baby's Own Aesop, an 1887 children's edition of Aesop's fables

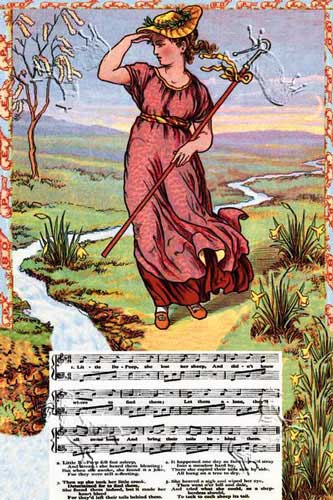
Illustration for Little Bo Peep, c. 1885

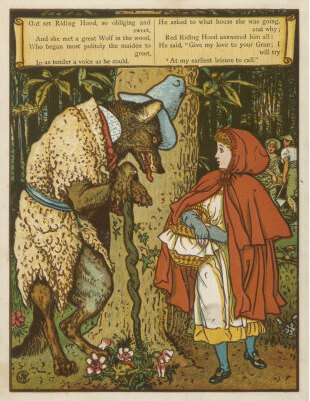
"Little Red Riding Hood Meets the Wolf in the Woods"

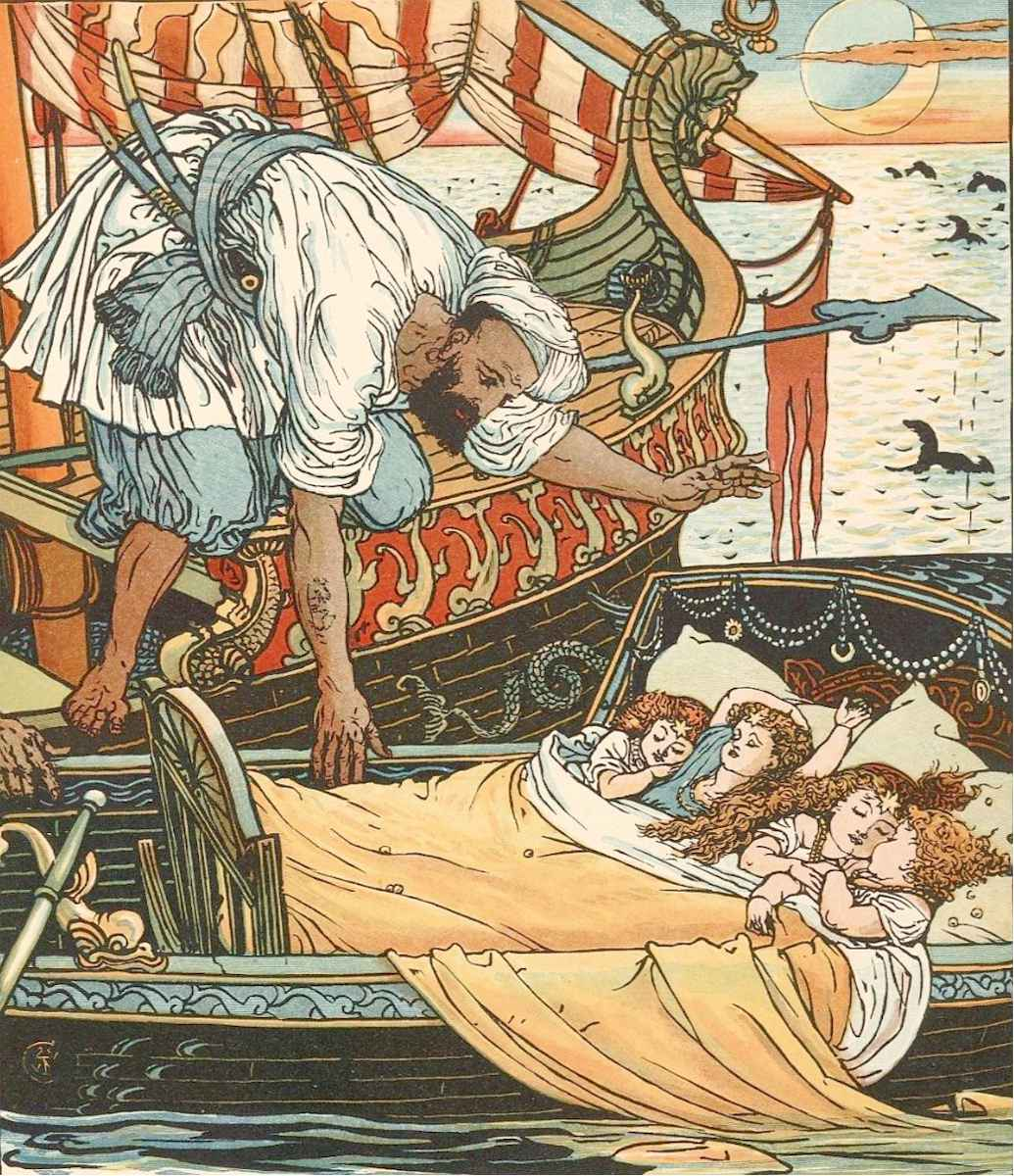
"The children of Queen Blondine and sister Brunette picked up by a Corsair", from the fairy tale Princess Belle-Etoile, 1884

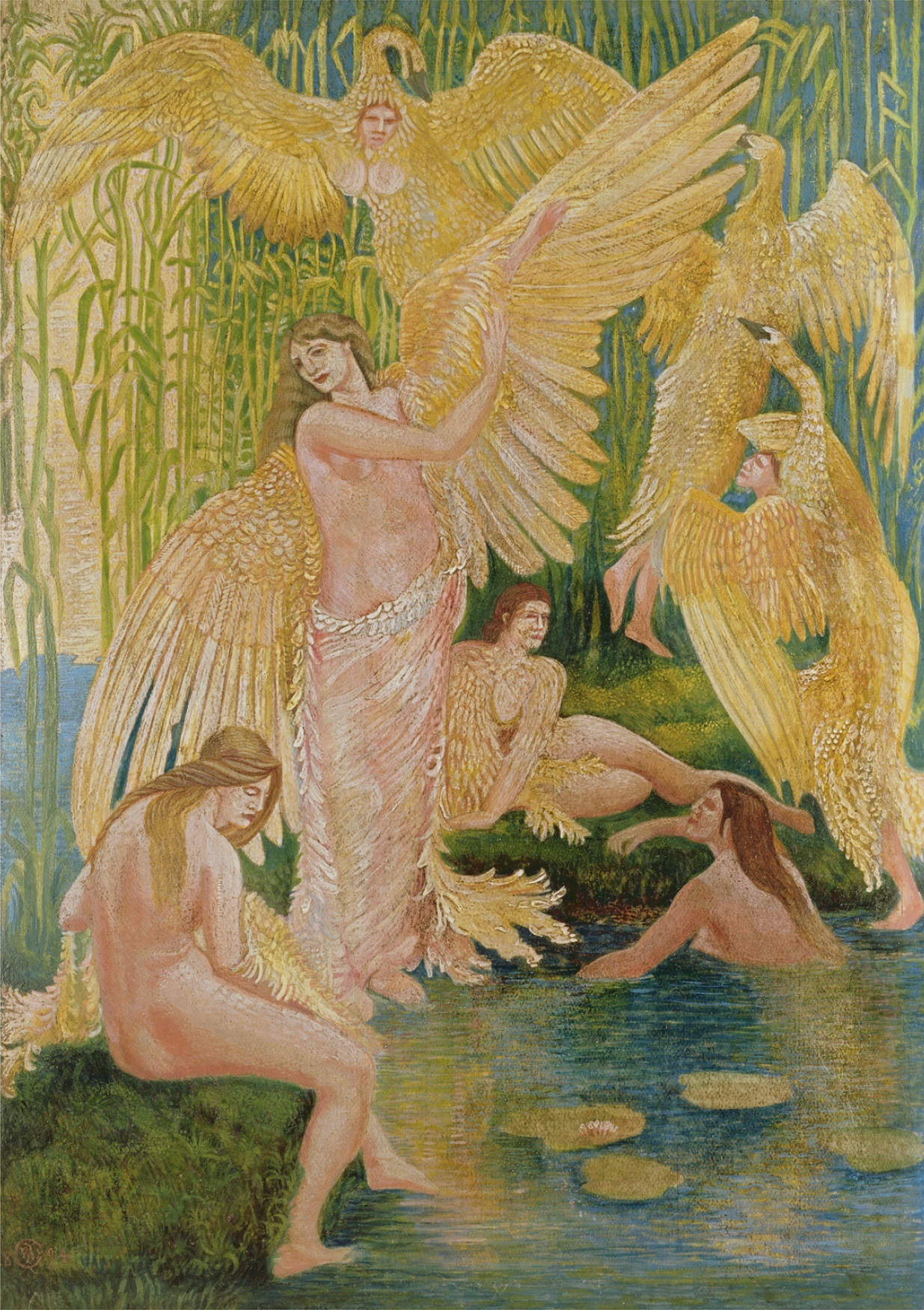
The Swan Maidens, 1894

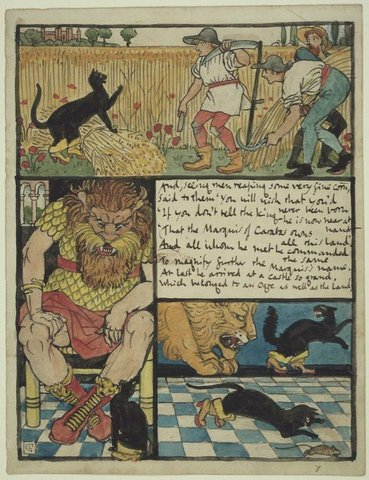
Comic-like illustration for "Puss in Boots" from The Marquis of Carabas' Picture Book

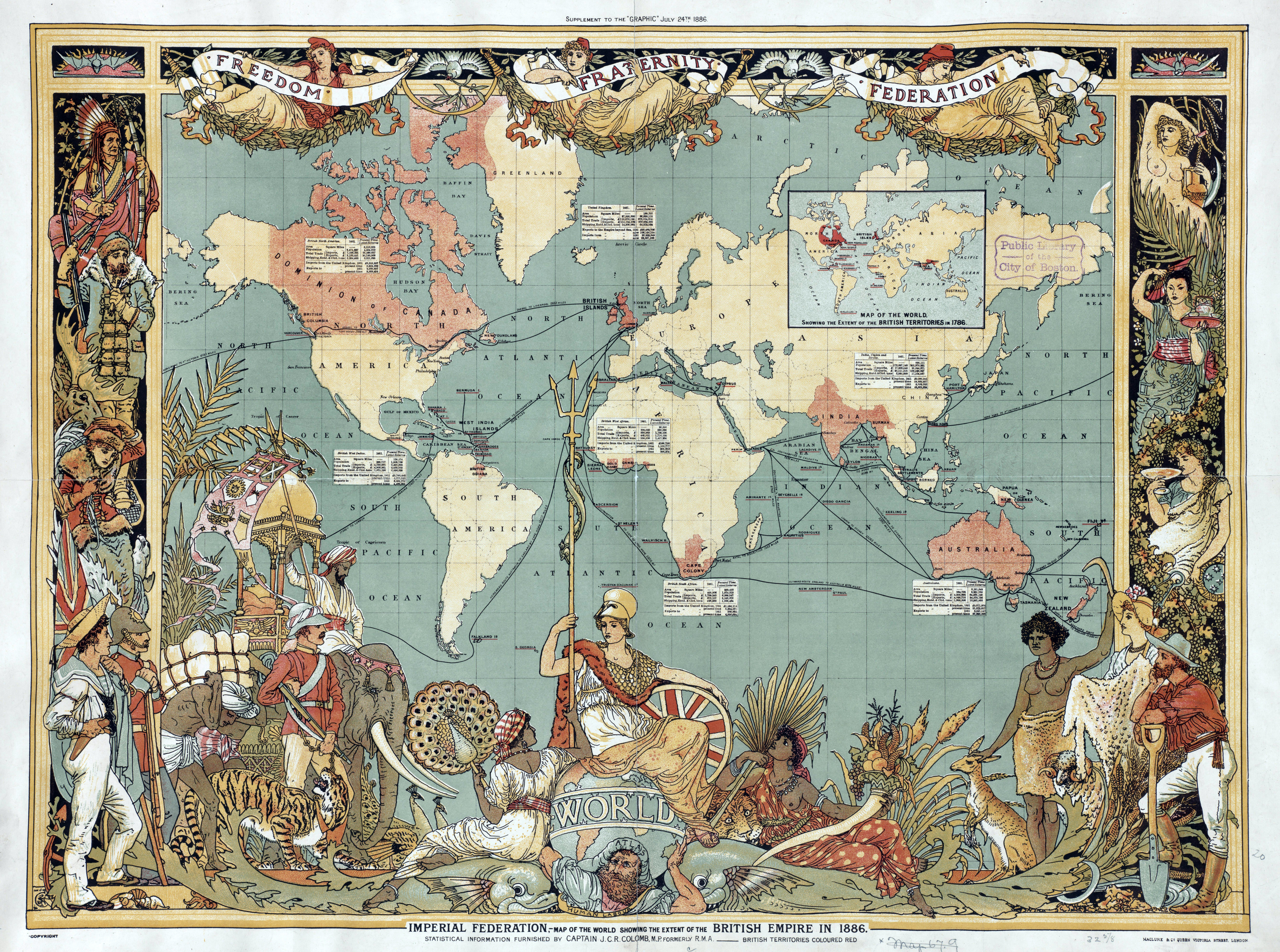
Map of the world designed for the Colonial and Indian Exhibition of 1886, showing Britannia seated on the world.

== Works ==
- Cartoons for the Cause 1886–1896 London: Twentieth Century Press, 1896 (revised version 1907).
- Line and Form. London: G. Bell and Sons, 1900.
- Moot points; friendly disputes on art & industry between Walter Crane & Lewis F. Day. London, B.T. Batsford, 1903
- An Artist's Reminiscences. New York: Macmillan, 1907.
- William Morris to Whistler. London: G.Bell and Sons, 1911

== See also ==
- Royal West of England Academy
