= Marcus Ward & Co. =

British publishing company

Marcus Ward & Company
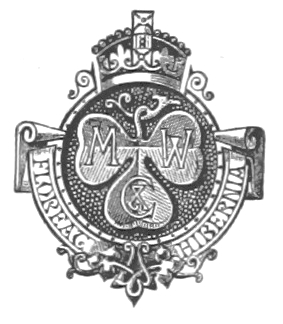
- Status: Defunct (1899)
- Founded: 1833
- Founder: Marcus Ward
- Defunct: 1899
- Successor: McCaw, Stevenson, & Orr, Ltd.
- Country of origin: United Kingdom
- Headquarters location: Belfast, London
- Distribution: Worldwide
- Publication types: Books, calendars, greeting cards
- Nonfiction topics: Children's literature

Marcus Ward and Co. was an Irish publishing company known for its illustrated books for children and adults, as well as its decorative greeting cards.

It had its beginnings in 1802, with a partnership between John Ward, James Blow and Robert Greenfield. By the 1820s they owned paper mills in Belfast, Comber and Coleraine. which operated under the company name of John Ward and Sons. In the early 1830s Marcus Ward (son of John Ward) took over the running of the Belfast paper mill. Then in 1833 Marcus formed a new company, Marcus Ward & Sons, based in Belfast, having a new direction, in stationery and general publishing. Marcus Ward and Sons soon became very successful in the area of colour lithography, winning a medal at the Great Exhibition of 1851. By the time Marcus died in 1847 his three sons, Francis, William and John, had successfully taken over the running of the business. (In later life John was a Fellow of the Society of Antiquaries (FSA), committee member of the Egypt Exploration Society and author of several titles on Middle Eastern archaeology, sometimes illustrated by his own watercolours.)

In the 1860s Marcus Ward & Co began mass-producing calendars and greeting cards. Initially they printed cards for other publishers such as Charles Goodall & Son and Charles Bennett. By the late 1860s they began printing greeting cards under their own name. This venture turned out to be very successful, the company engaging Thomas Crane as artistic director and talented artists such as Kate Greenaway and Walter Crane as illustrators. In the early years of card production they marked the reverse with their trademark. In later years the company name was printed on the front side of their greeting cards.

Marcus Ward & Co published a number of book series including The New Plutarch (series editors: Walter Besant and William Jackson Brodribb) and The Illustrated Waverley Novels.

== Gallery ==
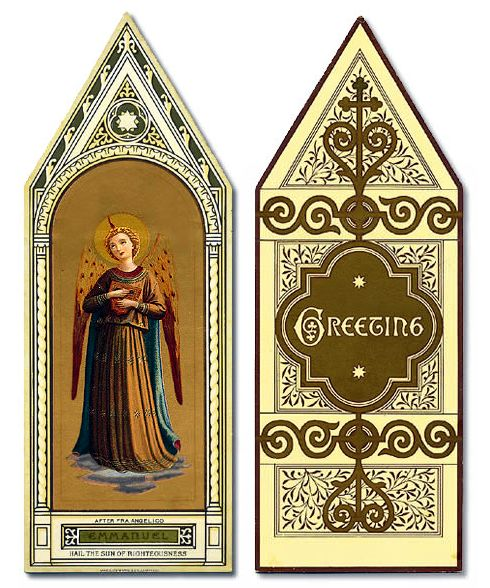
Bookmark and greeting card late 1800s

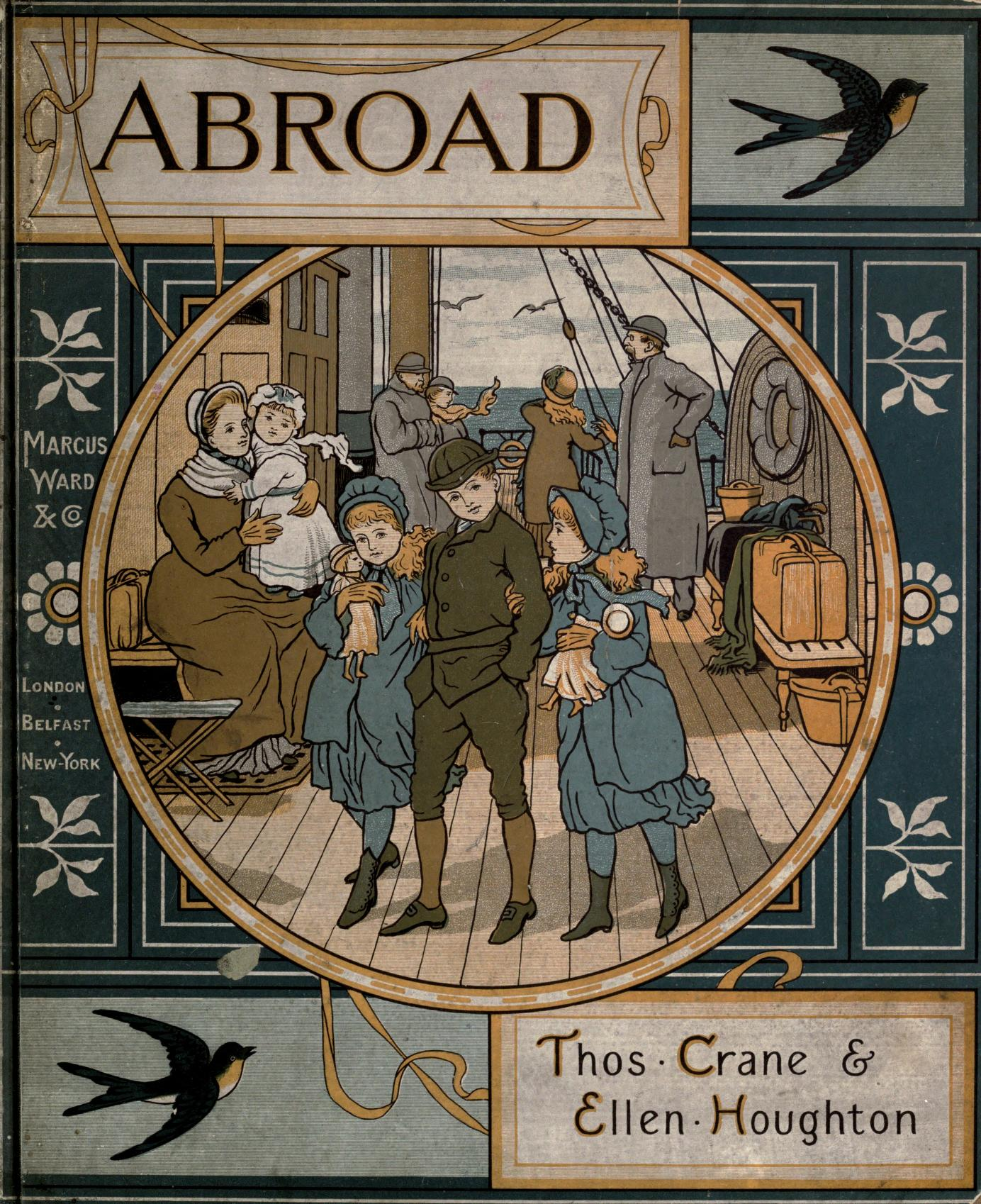
Cover to Abroad (1882), by Thomas Crane & Ellen Houghton

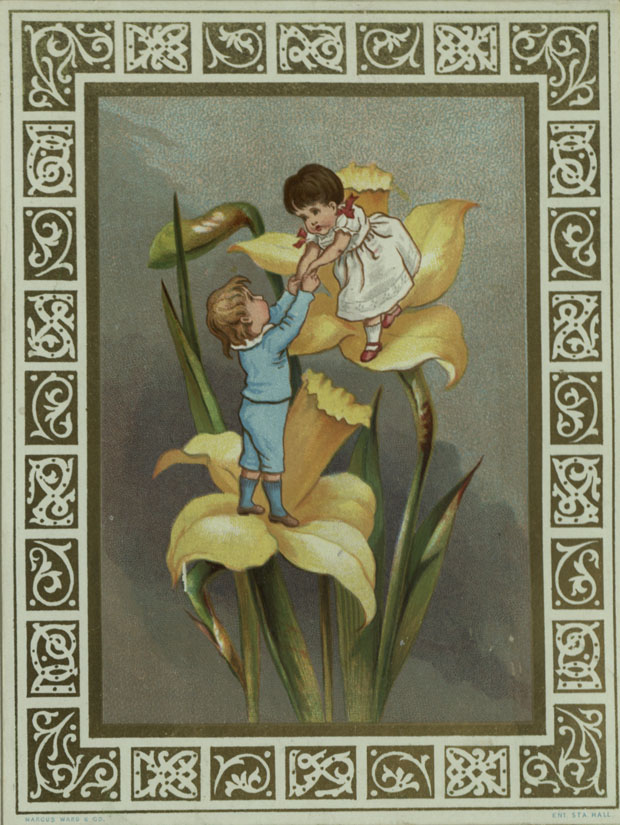
Kate Greenaway greeting card, ca. 1877

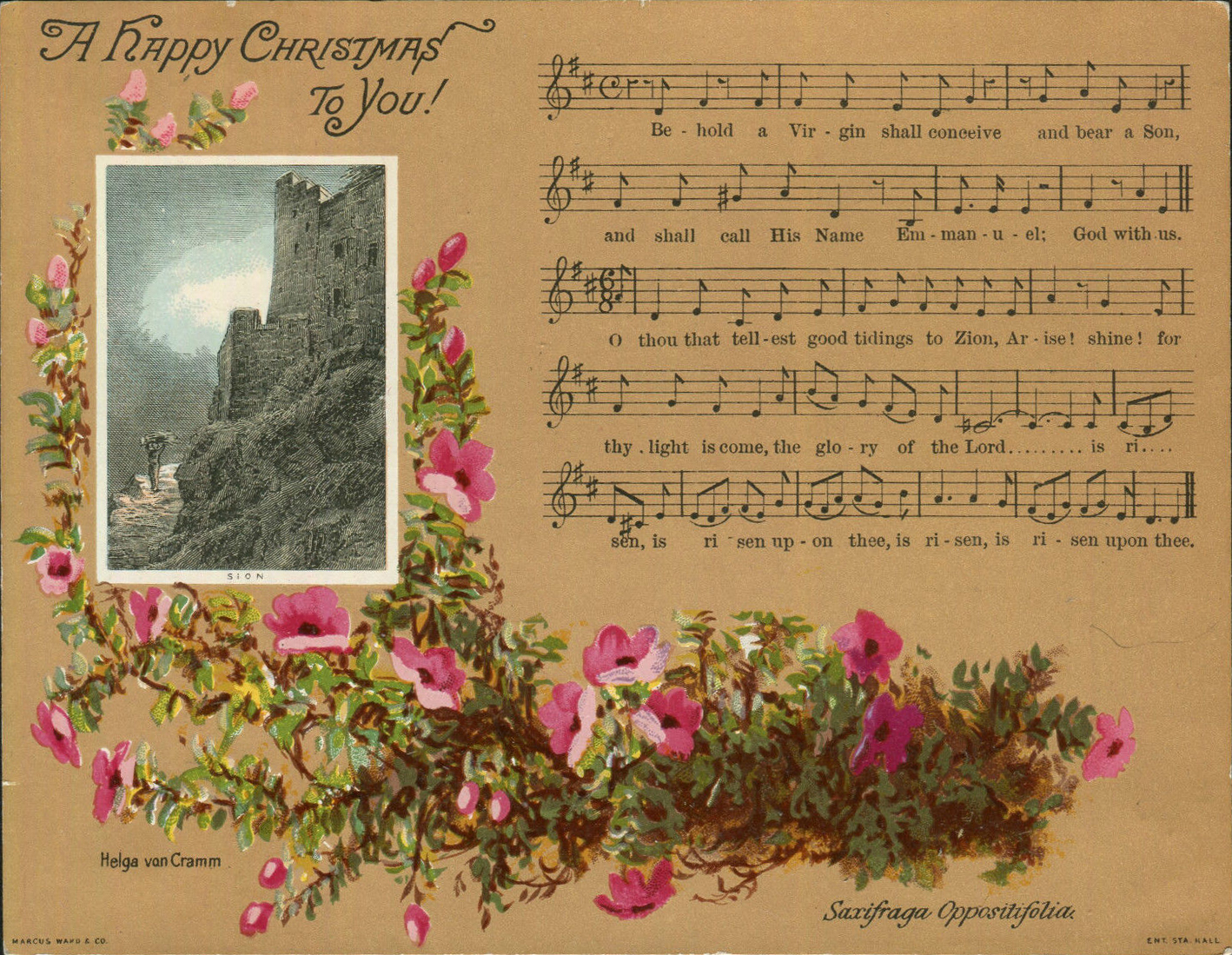
Helga von Cramm, Christmas card ca. 1880
