= Emerson (given name) =

- Gender: Unisex

Origin
- Meaning: son of Emery

Other names
- Related names: Emmerson, Emersyn

Emerson is an English given name, a transferred use of an English surname coming either from Anglo-Saxon Emars sunu, "Emar's son," or from "Emery's son." (See also Emerson (surname).) It is in use for both boys and girls. Spelling variants such as Emersyn are also in regular use.

== Usage ==
It has ranked among the top one thousand names for newborn boys in the United States at different times since 1880 and has been among the top three hundred names for American boys since 2013. It has been among the one thousand most used names for girls in the United States since 2002 and among the top two hundred names for girls there since 2014.

== Men ==
- Emerson (footballer, born 1972) (Emerson Moisés Costa), Brazilian footballer
- Émerson (footballer, born July 1973) (Émerson Luiz Firmino), Brazilian footballer
- Emerson (footballer, born August 1973) (Emerson Pereira da Silva), Brazilian footballer
- Emerson (footballer, born 1976) (Émerson Ferreira da Rosa), aka The Puma, Brazil international footballer
- Émerson (footballer, born 1977) (Émerson Ferreira Lopes), Brazilian footballer
- Emerson (footballer, born July 1980) (Emerson da Silva Leal), Brazilian footballer
- Emerson (footballer, born August 1980) (Emerson Ramos Borges), Brazilian footballer
- Emerson (footballer, born May 1982) (Emerson Aparecido Vivas Vergílio), Brazilian footballer
- Emerson (footballer, born August 1982) (Emerson José da Conceição), Brazilian footballer
- Emerson (footballer, born May 1983) (Emerson dos Santos da Silva), Brazilian footballer
- Emerson (footballer, born July 1983) (Emerson Feliciano De Barros Freitas Carvalho), Brazilian footballer
- Emerson (footballer, born January 1986) (Emerson Reis Luiz), Brazilian footballer
- Emerson (footballer, born February 1986) (Emerson da Conceição), Brazilian footballer
- Emerson (footballer, born 1998) (Emerson Barbosa Rodrigues dos Santos), Brazilian footballer
- Emerson (footballer, born 2002) (Emerson Rodrigues Brito), Brazilian footballer
- Emerson Acuña (born 1979), Colombian footballer
- Emerson Alcântara (born 1970), Brazilian football manager and former player
- Emerson Boozer (born 1943), American football running back
- Emerson Carey (1906–1983), American football guard
- Emerson Carvalho (born 1993), Brazilian footballer
- Emerson Cesario (born 1990), Brazilian-born Timor-Leste international footballer
- Emerson Cris (born 1978), Brazilian football manager and former player
- Emerson Correa (born 1994), Argentine footballer
- Emerson da Luz (born 1982), Cape Verdean footballer
- Emerson Deocleciano (Emerson Santana Deocleciano; born 1999), Brazilian footballer
- Emerson Etem (born 1992), American ice hockey player
- Emerson Fittipaldi (born 1946), Brazilian Formula One race car driver
- Emerson Freitas (born 1999), Brazilian politician
- Emerson Hart (born 1969), American musician
- Emerson Hyndman (born 1996), American soccer player
- Emerson Jeka (born 2001), Australian rules footballer
- Emerson Martin (born 1970), American football guard
- Emerson Nunes (born 1981), Brazilian footballer
- Emerson Palmieri (born 1994), Brazilian-born Italy international footballer
- Emerson Panigutti (born 1976), Argentine footballer
- Emerson Paulista (Emerson de Andrade Santos; born 1980), Brazilian footballer
- Emerson Reba (born 1981), Brazilian footballer
- Emerson Rodríguez (footballer) (born 2000), Colombian footballer
- Emerson Rodríguez (volleyball) (born 1993), Venezuelan volleyball player
- Emerson Royal (Emerson Aparecido Leite de Souza Junior; born 1999), Brazilian footballer
- Emerson Santos (footballer, born 1992) (Emerson Gustavo Pinto dos Santos), Brazilian footballer
- Emerson Santos (footballer, born 1995) (Emerson Raymundo Santos), Brazilian footballer
- Emerson Sheik (Márcio Passos de Albuquerque; born 1978), Brazilian-born Qatar international footballer
- Emerson Spartz (born 1987), American webmaster for the Harry Potter fansite MuggleNet
- Emerson Thome (Emerson Augusto Thome; born 1972), retired Brazilian footballer, also known as "Paredão"
- Emerson Umaña (born 1981), Salvadoran footballer
- Emerson Windy, American hip-hop artist
- Emersonn (born 2004), Brazilian footballer
- Nhanhá (Emerson César dos Santos; born 1980), Brazilian footballer

== Women ==
- Emerson Allen (born 1999), American rugby union player
- Emerson Elgin (born 2003), American professional soccer player
- Emerson Jones (born 2008), Australian tennis player
- Emerson Levy, American politician
- Emerson Tenney (born 1997), American actress
- Emerson Woods (born 2000), Australian rules footballer

== See also ==
- Emerson (surname)
- Emerson (disambiguation) for other uses
