= Charles Emmerson =

Charles Emmerson or Emerson may refer to:

- Charles Emmerson (historian) (born 1976), British-Australian historian
- Charles Emmerson (restaurateur) (1835 or 1836–1883), Singaporean restaurateur
- Charles Emmerson (Illinois politician), 18th century Illinois state representative
- Charles Emerson (1863–1919), Newfoundland lawyer and politician
- Charles Wesley Emerson (1837–1908), American minister

== See also ==
- Charles Emerson Beecher (1856–1904), American paleontologist
- Charles Emerson Waters (1910–1979), American politician
- Charles Emerson Winchester, fictional character from TV series M*A*S*H
- Emerson (disambiguation)
- Emmerson (disambiguation)
