= Emerson =

Emerson may refer to:

== People ==
- Emerson (surname), a surname (and list of people with that name)
- Emerson (given name), a given name (and list of people with that name)
- Ralph Waldo Emerson, an American philosopher and essayist

== Places ==
=== Australia ===
- Emerson Crossing, a place in Adelaide

=== Canada ===
- Emerson, Manitoba
  - Pembina–Emerson Border Crossing
  - Emerson (electoral district), a former electoral division in Manitoba
- Emerson, Weldford Parish, New Brunswick

=== United Kingdom ===
- Emerson's Green or Emersons Green, South Gloucestershire, England
- Emerson Park, a suburb in Greater London

=== United States ===
- Emerson (Gary), a neighborhood in north-central Gary, Indiana
- Emerson, Arkansas
- Emerson, Georgia
- Emerson, Iowa
- Emerson, Michigan
- Emerson, Nebraska
- Emerson, New Jersey
- Emerson, North Carolina
- Emerson, Ohio
- Emerson, West Virginia
- Emerson Hill, Staten Island, a neighborhood of New York City
- Emerson Township, Michigan
- Emerson Township, Dixon County, Nebraska
- Emerson Township, Harlan County, Nebraska

== Institutions ==
- Emerson College, Boston, Massachusetts
- Emerson Hospital, Concord, Massachusetts
- Emerson Preparatory School, Washington, D.C.

== Companies ==
- Emerson Electric, American major multinational corporation
- Emerson Flutes
- Emerson Group, British property company
- Emerson Knives
- Emerson Radio
- Emerson Records

== Other uses ==
- Emerson Literary Society, a coed collegiate literary society
- Emerson String Quartet, a chamber music group
- Emerson, Lake & Palmer, a progressive rock group
- Emerson Drive, a Canadian country music group
- Emerson (horse), a Brazilian-bred thoroughbred racehorse
- Emerson (typeface)
- Emerson station (disambiguation)

== See also ==
- Emery (name)
- Emmerson (disambiguation)
