= Emmerson =

Emmerson may refer to:

== Places ==
- Emmerson Island, Nunavut, Canada

== People ==
=== Given name ===
- Emmerson Bockarie, Sierra Leonian pop singer
- Emmerson Boyce (born 1979), English-born professional footballer (soccer player) who represents Barbados internationally
- Emmerson Mnangagwa (born 1942), Zimbabwean politician
- Emmerson Nogueira (born 1972), Brazilian guitarist and songwriter
- Emmerson Trotman (born 1954), West Indies cricketer

=== Surname ===
- Archie Aldis Emmerson (born 1929), American landowner
- Ben Emmerson, KC (born 1963), English barrister
- Bill Emmerson (born 1945), American politician in California
- Charles Emmerson (disambiguation), multiple people
- Craig Emmerson (born 1971 or 1974), English-born rugby union player
- George Emmerson (1906–1966), English professional footballer (soccer player)
- Henry Emmerson (1853–1914), Canadian lawyer, businessman, politician, and philanthropist, the father of Henry Read Emmerson
- Henry Read Emmerson (1883–1954), Canadian business executive, salesman, and politician, the son of Henry Emmerson
- Henry Hetherington Emmerson (1831–1895), English artist
- Les Emmerson (1944–2021), Canadian vocalist and guitarist
- Louis Lincoln Emmerson (1863–1941), American politician, Governor of Illinois from 1929 to 1933
- Ralph Emmerson (1913–2007), English clergyman
- Scott Emmerson (born 1982), English professional footballer
- Simon Emmerson, British record producer, guitarist, and disc jockey
- Simon Emmerson (composer), (born 1950), electroacoustic music composer

== See also ==
- Emerson (disambiguation)
- Emery (name)
