= Under the Window =

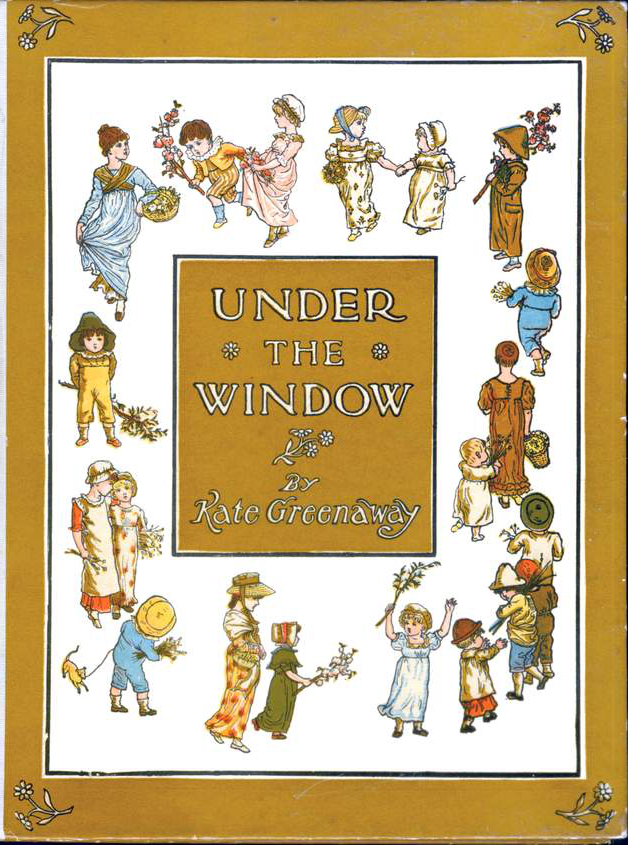
- Cover
- Author: Kate Greenaway/Edmund Evans
- Illustrator: Kate Greenaway
- Cover artist: Kate Greenaway
- Language: English
- Genre: Toy book
- Publisher: George Routledge & Son
- Publication date: 1879
- Publication place: United Kingdom
- Pages: 64

Under the Window: Pictures & Rhymes for Children (London, 1879) was Kate Greenaway's first children's picture book, composed of her own verses and illustrations. Selling over 100,000 copies, the toy book was a commercial success, helped launch Greenaway's career as a children's book illustrator and author in the late 19th century as well as starting what became known as the "Greenaway vogue".

Although Greenaway illustrated over 150 books, Under the Window and Marigold Garden (1885) were the only two books that she both wrote and illustrated. Under the Window is considered to be one of the first earliest examples of a designer picture book, and its popularity caused it to be imitated, the most blatant of which was the edition Frederick Warne published within weeks of its release.

== Background ==
In the late 1870s, Greenaway—who had been illustrating greeting cards—persuaded her father, who was also in the engraving business, to show Edmund Evans her manuscript, Under the Window. Evans explains: "I was at once fascinated by the originality of the drawings and the ideas of the verse, so I at once purchased them." Evans considered Greenaway's illustrations to be commercially appealing and encouraged Routledge to publish the book. Of Greenaway's first collection of illustrations and verse, Evans writes:

After I had engraved the blocks and colour blocks, I printed the first edition of 20,000 copies, and was ridiculed by the publishers for risking such a large edition of a six-shilling book; but the edition sold before I could reprint another edition; in the meantime copies were sold at a premium. Reprinting kept on till 70,000 was reached.

== Contents ==
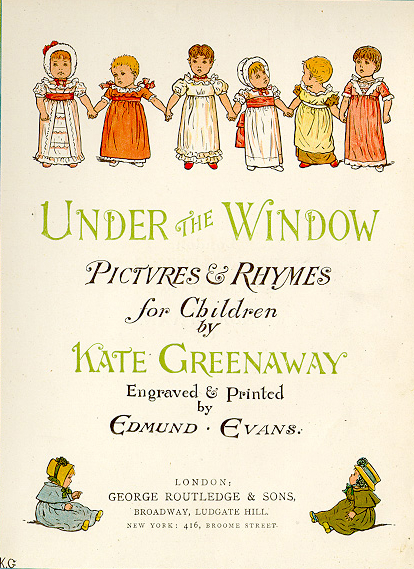
The title page

Under the Window: Pictures and Rhymes for Children consists of rhymes and traditional nursery rhymes. Greenaway wrote her own verse for the book. In Under the Window, Greenaway presented drawings of children dressed in styles based on the fashions of the turn-of-the-century. This appealed to the sensibilities of the time, since the children's clothing appeared sweetly old-fashioned to Greenaway's contemporaries, the more sophisticated of whom were involved in the Artistic Dress movement of the era. Her books were so popular that the clothing the children in them wore came back into fashion.

The book reflected the influence of the Arts and Crafts Movement with its aesthetic motifs described as "quaint fancies of olden times, soft refined colouring, and humour suggested rather than strongly expressed" Each of the pages is framed with a border, creating a detached, static effect, "as if the reader were observing the scene". The colouring is pale with gently modulated tints "favored by the Aesthetes", mainly soft yellows and greens. Other fashionable motifs illustrated in the book are sunflowers, blue and white china, and Queen Anne Style architecture. Also evident within the book is the influence of Japanese woodblocks with their definite block outline, flat, delicate colours, and use of white space.

The emphasis is placed largely on the illustrations which are accompanied by verse. The images reflect the English countryside, childhood fantasies, and adult parodies.

== Publication history ==
Under the Window appeared in stores in October 1879, in time for Christmas. Edmund Evans recalled how:

George Routledge "chaffed" me considerably for printing 20,000 first edition of a book to sell at six shillings, but we soon found out that we had not printed nearly enough to supply the first demand: I know booksellers sold copies at a premium getting 10 shillings each for them: it was of course, long out of print, for I could not print fast enough to keep up the sale.

A further 70,000 copies were printed and sold in England, with separate editions for America and other European countries.

The book was published in 1879; Edmund Evans produced 100,000 copies of Under the Window (including French and German editions) which helped launch Greenaway's career as an author and illustrator of children's books.

Under the Window was followed by The Birthday Book (1880), Mother Goose (1881), Little Ann (1883), and other children's books which became enormously successful. Despite the fact that the Greenaway's books were considered toy books, they created a revolution in children's book illustration and were praised by John Ruskin, Ernest Chesneau, Arsène Alexandre in France, Richard Muther in Germany, and other leading art critics throughout the world.

== Imitation ==
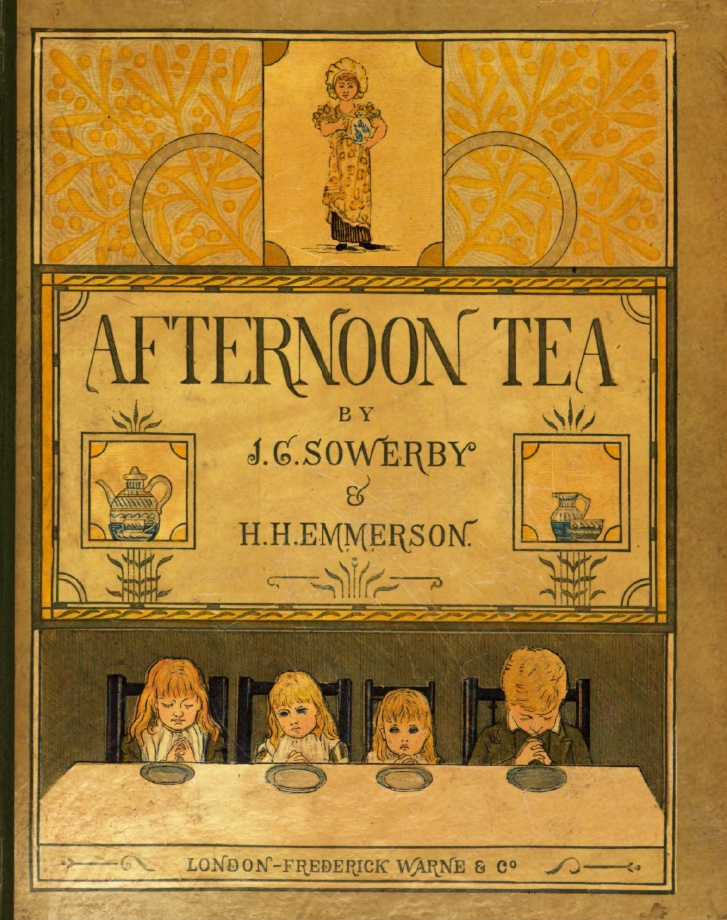
Cover of Afternoon Tea (1880)

Within weeks of publication of Under the Window, several imitations appeared, frustrating Greenaway. Most notable of them was a children's book called Afternoon Tea: a book of new rhymes for children by John G. Sowerby and Henry Hetherington Emmerson published by the rival firm Frederick Warne which Greenaway regarded as a "blatant piracy." Edmund Evans too shared Greenaway's frustration, writing in his Reminiscences:

Immediately this novelty in style was imitated by several artists who ought to have known better: some actually copied parts of the figures from Under the Window and took the head of one to add to the figure of another, thinking not to be found out. One fairly well-known artist from the North of England wanted me to buy a copy of a book he had drawn, painted, and I believe written the verses, calling the book Afternoon Tea. Of course I could have nothing to do with such a bare faced copy of K.G.'s book. It was, of course, bought and published by another firm of publishers and soon got classed as "Kate Greenaway Books" which flooded the bookseller's shop for years to follow.

Greenaway's friends considered Afternoon Tea to be a crude exploitation and urged legal action. Greenaway's biographer Rodney Engen described Afternoon Tea as an objectionable "pastiche" of Greenaway's style, with "shocking alterations", such as a boy furtively smoking a pipe and a darkened graveyard, in shades that Greenaway would never use. Frederick Locker denounced the book as "a shameful imitation of your manner, which if it goes on will tend to disgust the brutal British public and therefore injure you."

== Sources ==
- Evans, Edmund (April 1985). Ruari McLean (ed.). The Reminiscences of Edmund Evans, Wood Engraver and Colour Printer, 1826–1905. Oxford University Press, Incorporated. ISBN 978-0-19-818126-2.
- Engen, Rodney K. (1981). Kate Greenaway: a biography. London: Macdonald. ISBN 978-0-354-04200-0.
- Gasgoigne, Bamber (1986). How to Identify Prints (1995 ed.). New York: Thames and Hudson. ISBN 978-0-500-23454-9.
- Hunt, Peter; Dennis Butts (1995). Children's Literature: An Illustrated History. Oxford: Oxford University Press. ISBN 978-0-19-212320-6.
- Hunt, Peter; Sheila Ray (1996). International Companion Encyclopedia of Children's Literature. London: Routledge. p. 465. ISBN 978-0-203-16812-7. "edmund evans."
- Lundin, Anne (June 1993). "Under the Window and Afternoon Tea: "Twirling the Same Blade of Grass"". The Lion and the Unicorn. 17 (1). The Johns Hopkins University Press: 45–56. doi:10.1353/uni.0.0311. ISSN 0147-2593. S2CID 143336169.
- Ray, Gordon Norton (1991). The Illustrator and the book in England from 1790 to 1914. New York: Dover. ISBN 978-0-486-26955-9.
- Spielmann, M. H. (1905). Kate Greenaway. London: A and C Black. ISBN 978-1-4437-6122-2.
- Taylor, Ina; Greenaway, Kate (September 1991). The art of Kate Greenaway: a nostalgic portrait of childhood. Pelican Publishing Company. ISBN 978-0-88289-867-4.
