= Ralph Hedley =

British painter, woodcarver and illustrator (1848–1913)

Ralph Hedley RBA
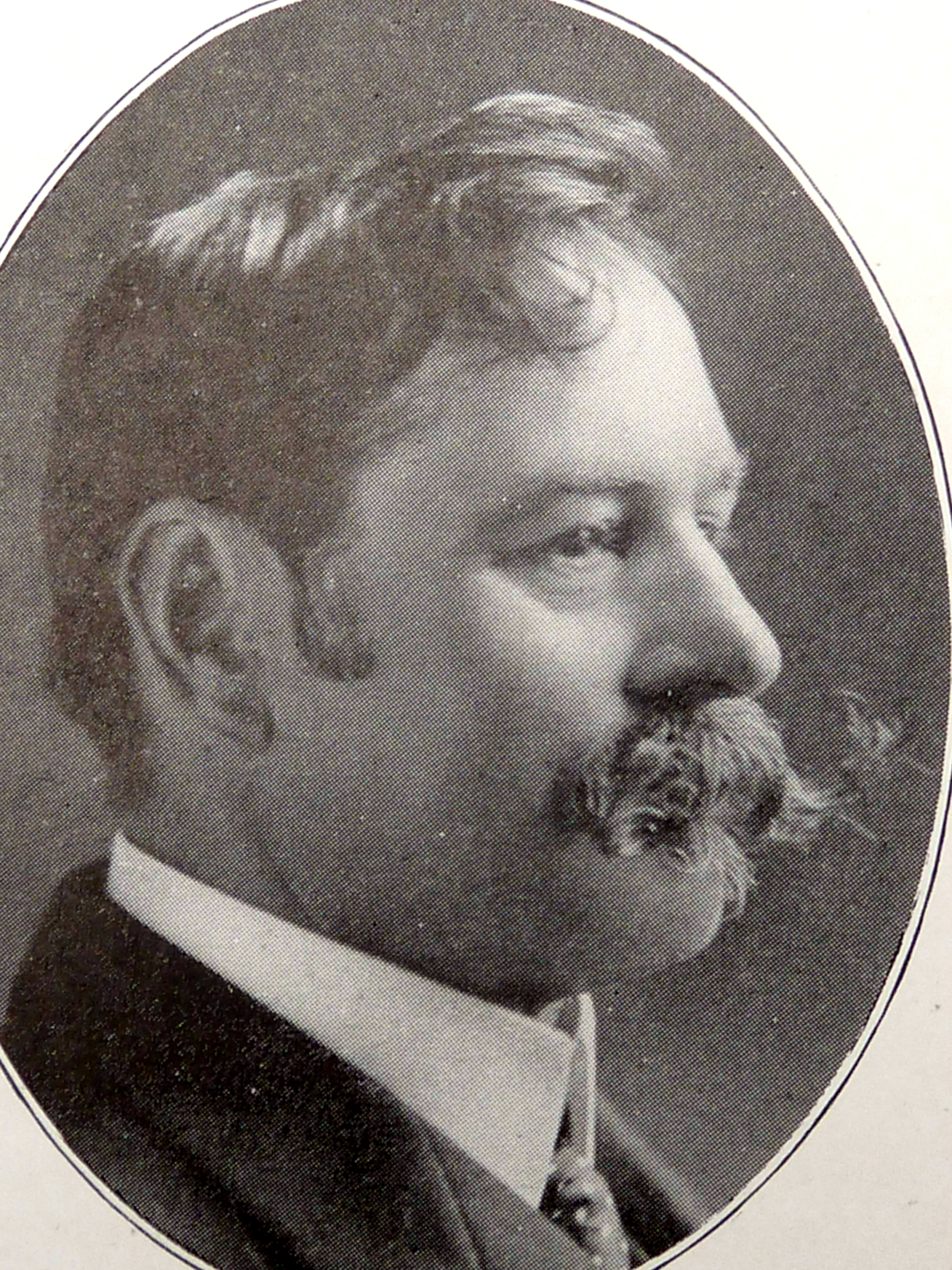
- Born: December 31, 1848; Gilling West, North Riding of Yorkshire, England
- Died: June 14, 1913 (aged 64); Newcastle upon Tyne, Northumberland
- Education: Studied life drawing under William Bell Scott
- Known for: Co-founder of the Bewick Club (a Newcastle artists' foundation); paintings recording Tyneside
- Notable work: Woodcarving in Newcastle Cathedral, and paintings Cat in a Cottage Window, Last in Market and Going Home
- Movement: Realism

Ralph Hedley (31 December 1848 – 14 June 1913) was a realist painter, woodcarver and illustrator, best known for his paintings portraying scenes of everyday life in the North East of England.

== Biography ==
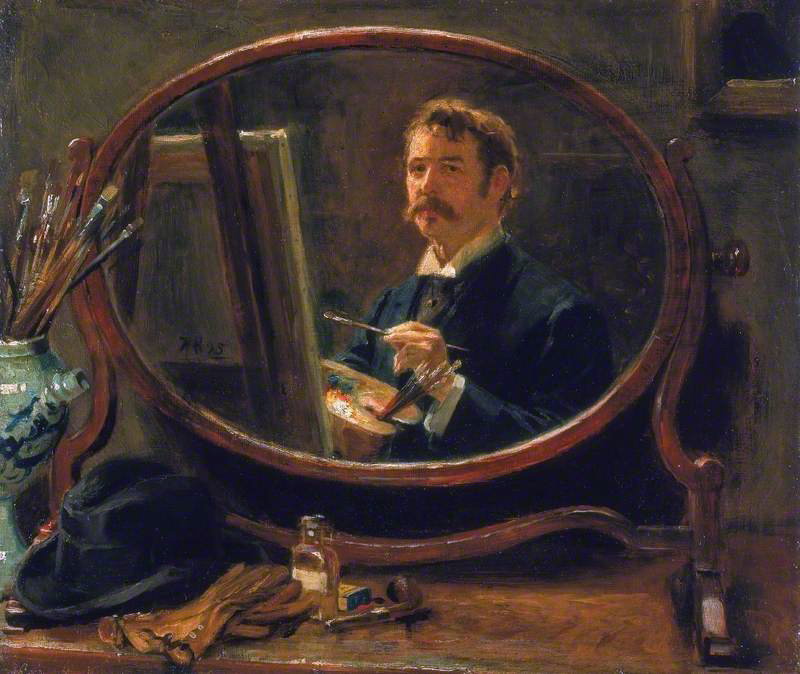
Self-portrait (1895)

Born in Gilling West near Richmond, North Yorkshire, Ralph and his parents Richard and Anne Hedley moved to Newcastle upon Tyne around 1850, on the wave of industrial opportunity. Aged about 13, he was apprenticed to Thomas Tweedy in his carving workshops, simultaneously studying art and design at the 'Government school' in Newcastle, and attending evening classes at the Life School under William Bell Scott. At the age of 14 he was awarded a bronze medal by government's Department of Art and Science.

After concluding his apprenticeship, Hedley established a successful woodcarving business, whilst also producing lithographs for the local press and taking every opportunity to work as an artist. He had the first of many paintings, The Newsboy, accepted for exhibition at the Royal Academy in 1879. Joining with Henry Hetherington Emmerson and Robert Jobling, they founded the Bewick Club which encouraged and exhibited the work of the local artists of the North East, staging the first exhibition in 1884.

Examples of his wood carving work can be found in The Cathedral Church of St Nicholas, Newcastle, where, between 1882 and 1889, he and his workshop carved the choir and rood screen for the scheme by architect Robert James Johnson (1832–1892), commissioned when the Diocese of Newcastle was founded and Newcastle upon Tyne became a City. Other carving work can be seen in St Andrew's Church, Newcastle upon Tyne and many other North Eastern churches.

== Career ==
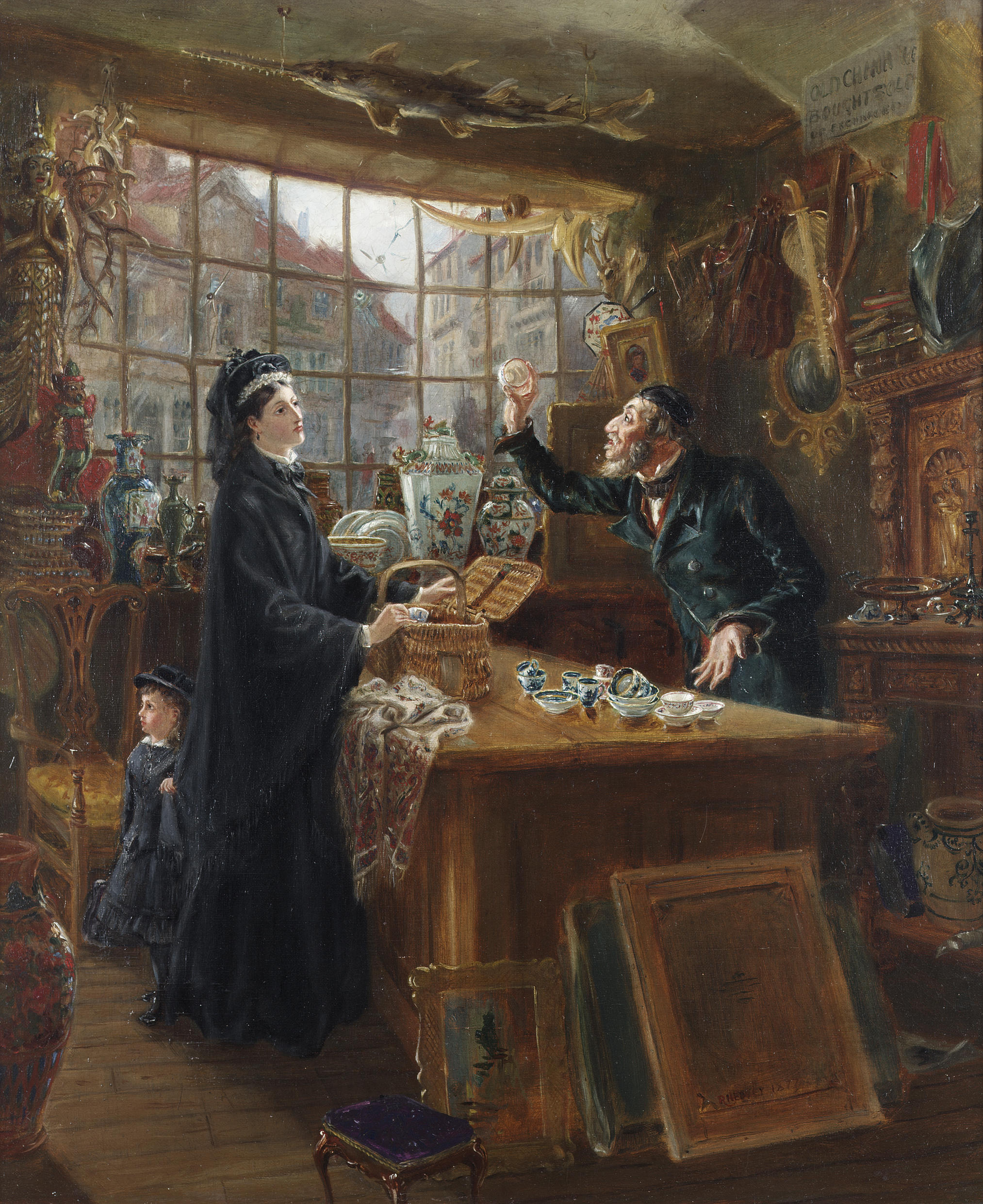
Ralph Hedley, The Old China Shop (1877)

Ralph Hedley, John Graham Lough in His Studio, 1881.

He was a member of the Royal Society of British Artists, and had more than fifty of his paintings displayed at the Royal Academy between 1879 and 1904. He became President of the Bewick Club and was Vice-President of the South Shields Art Club.

Today, Hedley's paintings are appreciated for the record they provide of everyday life in Tyneside in the late 19th and early 20th centuries. Even at the time of Hedley's death in June 1913, the Newcastle Daily Chronicle recognised the value of his work, arguing that "What Burns did for the peasantry of Scotland with his pen, Ralph Hedley with his brush and palette had done for the Northumberland miner and labouring man."

A number of Hedley's works, including Cat in a Cottage Window, Last in Market and 'Going Home' are known throughout the world, many of them reproduced as popular prints. In March 2004, The Tournament, depicting a group of boys having a piggy-back fight, sold for £44,000 - a record for a Hedley painting at auction.

Hedley is the amongst the most recent Newcastle figures to be honoured by the city's Commemorative Plaque Scheme. The plaque was unveiled by the Lord Mayor, Councillor George Douglas, on Monday 29 November 2004, at 19 Belle Grove Terrace in Spital Tongues, where Hedley lived from 1885 until his death in 1913. The property now forms part of the Belle Grove public house. Guests attending the unveiling included relatives of Hedley, and Julie Milne, the curator of the Laing Art Gallery. The Laing holds one of the largest bodies of Hedley's work, including 41 oil paintings and three watercolours, and a major exhibition devoted to Hedley in 1990. A book on Hedley's life and times was published in association with that exhibition.

As part of the Festival of the North East, 2013, an exhibition of his work held in local public collections was shown at the Shipley Art Gallery, Gateshead, and a small group of works from private and public collections was shown at the Hartlepool Art Gallery.

To mark the centenary of his death, Ralph Hedley was honoured by a choral evensong held at The Cathedral Church of St Nicholas on 14 June 2013, conducted by the Dean, the Very Revd Christopher Dalliston, and with the Newcastle Cathedral Choir.

== See also ==
- List of British artists
