= Emerson Reba =

Brazilian footballer (born 1981)

Emerson Francisco Matías (born December 1, 1981, in Brazil), known as Emerson Reba, is a Brazilian footballer currently playing for Defensa y Justicia in the Primera B Nacional Argentina.

== Teams ==
- (Paraguay) Independiente F.B.C. 2011
- (Argentina) Defensa y Justicia 2012–present
