= Emerson Freitas =

Brazilian politician (born 1999)

Member of the Legislative Assembly of Pernambuco
- Incumbent
- Assumed office 1 February 2027

Personal details
- Born: 14 December 1999 (age 26)
- Party: Brazilian Democratic Movement

Emerson Jhuan Pereira do Nascimento (born 14 December 1999), better known as Emerson Freitas, is a Brazilian politician and internet personality who was elected member of the Legislative Assembly of Pernambuco in 2026. As of 2026, he has over 1 million followers on Instagram.
