= Charles Emmerson (historian) =

British-Australian historian

Charles Emmerson is a British-Australian writer, editor and historian. He was born in Melbourne and grew up in London. He studied Modern History at Oxford University, and pursued postgraduate studies at the Institut d'Etudes Politiques in Paris. He has worked for the International Crisis Group, the World Economic Forum, the Financial Times, and as a senior research fellow at Chatham House. He has written three well-received books: The Future History of the Arctic (2010), 1913: The World Before the Great War (2013) and Crucible: The Long End of the Great War and the Birth of a New World, 1917-1924 (2019). Emmerson has also contributed to programmes on BBC radio 4 and BBC Radio 3. In 2025, he founded the independent Translator magazine, which translates long-form journalism and reportage from around the world into English.

He lives in London.
