= Emerson Correa =

Argentine footballer (born 1994)

Personal information
- Full name: Emerson Nicolás Correa
- Date of birth: 30 August 1994 (age 32)
- Place of birth: Argentina
- Height: 1.83 m (6 ft 0 in)
- Position: Goalkeeper

Youth career
- River Plate
- All Boys

Senior career*
Years	Team	Apps	(Gls)
2015	Argentino de Merlo		
2016–2019	Defensores Unidos	15	(0)
2019–2020	Sportivo Italiano	14	(0)
2020–2021	Real Pilar	3	(0)
- * Club domestic league appearances and goals as of 06:58, 20 August 2022 (UTC)

Emerson Nicolás Correa (born 30 August 1994) is an Argentine professional footballer who plays as a goalkeeper.

== Career ==
Correa's career began in the youth systems of River Plate and All Boys. After departing All Boys, Correa joined Argentino de Merlo. 2016 saw Defensores Unidos sign Correa. He made nine appearances across two seasons in Primera C Metropolitana from 2016 to 2017, with the club winning promotion to Primera B Metropolitana in 2017–18. His first appearance in the third tier arrived in November 2018 during a 2–1 victory over Atlanta. In July 2020, Correa departed back to tier four with Sportivo Italiano.

== Career statistics ==
As of 11 July 2020.

Appearances and goals by club, season and competition
Club	Season	League			Cup		League Cup		Continental		Other		Total	
Club	Season	Division	Apps	Goals	Apps	Goals	Apps	Goals	Apps	Goals	Apps	Goals	Apps	Goals
Defensores Unidos	2018–19	Primera B Metropolitana	6	0	0	0	—		—		0	0	6	0
Sportivo Italiano	2019–20	Primera C Metropolitana	12	0	0	0	—		—		0	0	12	0
Career total			18	0	0	0	—		—		0	0	18	0

== Honours ==
Defensores Unidos

- Primera C Metropolitana: 2017–18
