= Émerson (footballer, born 1977) =

Brazilian footballer

Personal information
- Full name: Émerson Ferreira Lopes
- Date of birth: 4 June 1977 (age 49)
- Place of birth: Esmeraldas, Minas Gerais, Brazil
- Height: 1.83 m (6 ft 0 in)
- Position: Goalkeeper

Youth career
- –1998: Atlético Mineiro

Senior career*
Years	Team	Apps	(Gls)
1998–2002	Atlético Mineiro	68	(0)
2001	→ Atlético Paranaense (loan)		
2003	Tupi		
2003–2004	Vila Nova		
2005	Ipatinga		
2005–2006	América de Natal		
2006	Vilavelhense		
2007	Valerio		

International career
1998	Brazil	1	(0)

Managerial career
- 2012: Nacional-NS (goalkeepers coach)
- * Club domestic league appearances and goals as of 1 September 2026

Émerson Ferreira Lopes (born 4 July 1977), simply known as Émerson, is a Brazilian former professional footballer who played as a goalkeeper.

== Club career ==
A product of Atlético Mineiro's youth academy, Émerson rose to prominence early in his career, making 68 appearances for the club and winning the state championship in 1999. He was also part of the Athletico Paranaense squad that won the Brazilian championship in 2001, in addition to playing for other teams such as Vila Nova and América de Natal.

== International career ==
Émerson was called up for a friendly match against Russia on 18 November 1998, coming on as a substitute for Rogério Ceni during the game.

== Honours ==
Atlético Mineiro

- Campeonato Mineiro: 1999

Athletico Paranaense

- Campeonato Brasileiro: 2001
