= Emerson, West Virginia =

Unincorporated community in West Virginia, United States

Emerson
- Unincorporated community
- Location within the state of West Virginia Emerson (the United States)
- Coordinates: 37°56′27″N 81°29′51″W
- Country: United States
- State: West Virginia
- County: Raleigh
- Elevation: 1,457 ft (444 m)
- Time zone: UTC-5 (Eastern (EST))
  - Summer (DST): UTC-4 (EDT)
- GNIS ID: 1553683

Emerson is an unincorporated community in Raleigh County, West Virginia.
