= Emerson station =

Emerson station can refer to:

- Emerson railway station, a commuter rail station in Adelaide, Australia
- Emerson station (New Jersey), a New Jersey Transit commuter rail station
- Emerson station (New York), a former rapid transit station in Rochester
- Emerson Park railway station, a London Overground station
- Emerson Park station (MetroLink), a St. Louis MetroLink station
