= Henry Hetherington Emmerson =

English painter

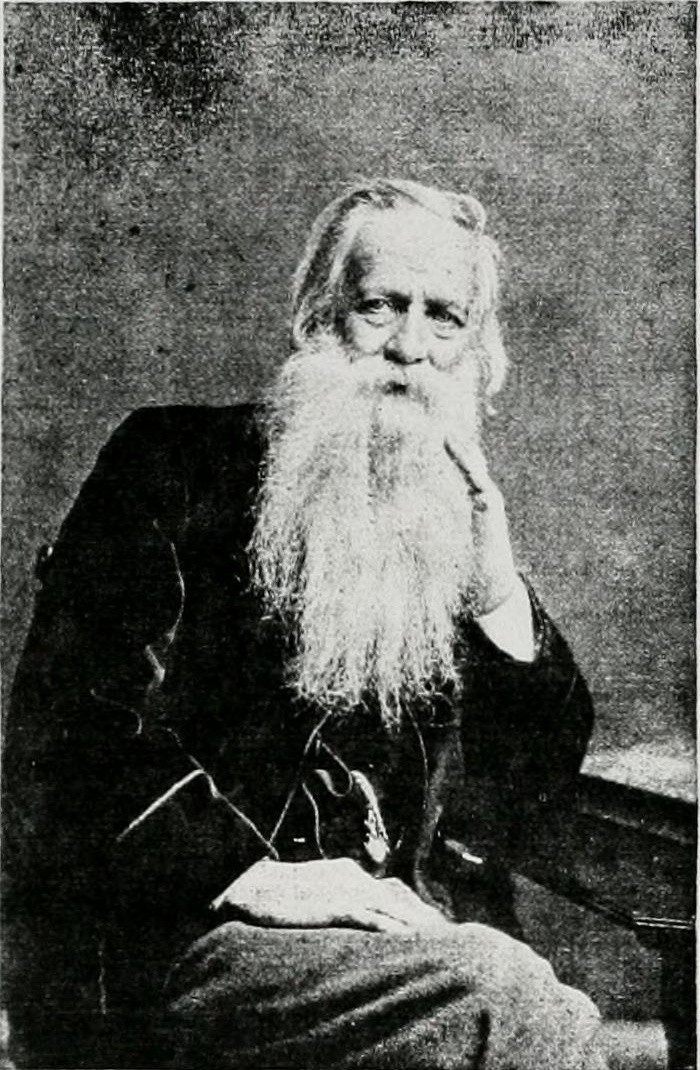
- Born: 11 November 1831; Chester-le-Street, County Durham, England
- Died: 28 August 1895 (aged 63); Cullercoats, England
- Known for: Painting

Henry Hetherington Emmerson (11 November 1831 – 28 August 1895), commonly known by his initials H. H. Emmerson, was an English painter and illustrator.

Emmerson (née Hetherington). At the age of 13, he went to Newcastle, where he studied painting and engraving under William Bell Scott at the Government School of Art. After some two and a half years under Scott's tutelage, Emmerson was sent to Paris to study for six months as the beneficiary of a clergyman who had taken interest in his work. After his return, he was accepted into the Royal Academy in London.

Upon his return to northern England, he lived in Ebchester and met his soon-to-be wife. Emmerson was a founding member and first president of the Bewick Club, a Newcastle association of painters and illustrators that also included among its founders the likes of Robert Jobling, Ralph Hedley, John Surtees, and Thomas Dickinson. Notable paintings of Emmerson, some of which hung in the Royal Academy, include The Queen's Letter, The Critics, The First Suit, and The Foreign Invasion. His paintings of children were numerous and well known, with several being reproduced and popularised as engravings. A total of 58 works by Emmerson were exhibited at the Royal Academy during his lifetime.

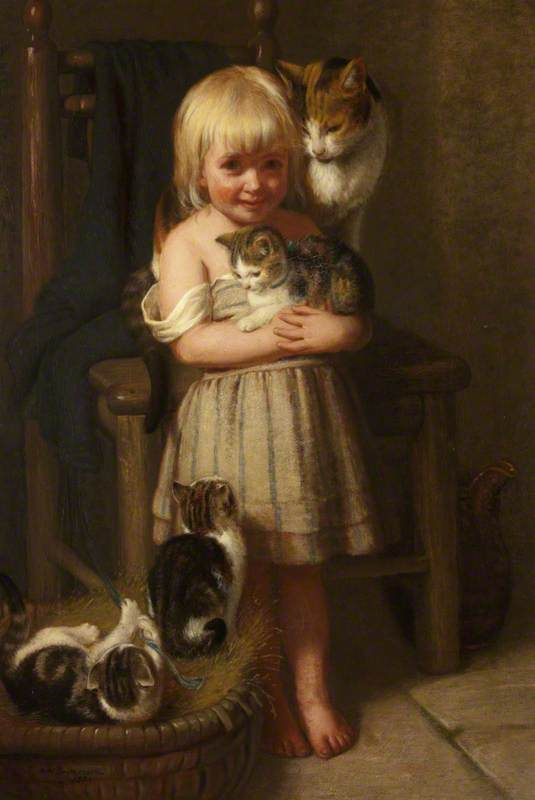
Edith Emmerson, Aged 3, 1874 National Trust, Cragside

Emmerson also provided illustrations to children's books, including Afternoon Tea (1880) with J. G. Sowerby, and The May Blossom (1881), both published by Frederick Warne & Co. Afternoon Tea, although well received by reviewers attracted a bit of controversy, as some claimed it was a cheap derivative of Under the Window, a popular 1879 book by Kate Greenaway. Greenaway herself considered the book "blatant piracy", while Sowerby argued the illustrations were not imitations but merely in the same genre.

Emmerson was also well known as a runner in his time. As a child, he was said to be the fastest of his age in the world; a challenge was placed in Bell's Life in London to run against any boy his age, and was never accepted. Emmerson was an ardent runner even to the end of his life, as well as an avid follower of the Rockcliff Football team.

Emmerson married Mary Bolton of Ebchester on 15 August 1857, and they had five daughters and two sons, both of whom were also artists. He died in his home in Cullercoats on 28 August 1895 at the age of 63, and was buried in Preston Cemetery in North Shields. In December 1895, an exhibition of his collected work was held in Newcastle. Emmerson claimed to be of the family that produced the poet and philosopher Ralph Waldo Emerson, although biographical details published after his death suggest the relation was probably very remote.
