= Toy book =

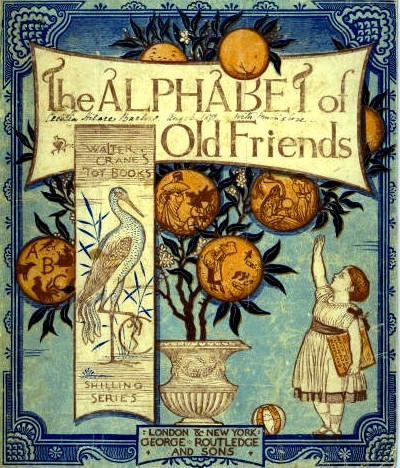
Cover of a toy book published in 1874, illustrated and designed by Walter Crane, coloured and printed by Edmund Evans.

Toy books were illustrated children's books that became popular in England's Victorian era. The earliest toy books were typically paperbound, with six illustrated pages and sold for sixpence; larger and more elaborate editions became popular later in the century. In the mid-19th century picture books began to be made for children, with illustrations dominating the text rather than supplementing the text.

The earliest toy books were hand painted, but in the mid-19th century London publishing house Dean & Son began printing toy books using chromolithography to colour the illustrations. Edmund Evans was the premier engraver and printer of toy books in London from the mid-19th century to the early-20th century, producing books for Routledge, Warne & Routledge using the wood block printing technique of chromoxylography. He was instrumental in popularizing children's books through the production of toy books during this period. To illustrate the books he hired and collaborated with Walter Crane, Randolph Caldecott and Kate Greenaway—known as the triumvirate of children's toy book illustrators.

== Early toy books ==
Hand coloured toy book, c. 1850

The term toy book originated in the 18th century when John Newbery began printing 'gift books'—such as A Little Pretty Pocket-Book (1744)—with small toys such as pincushions for girls included in the packaging. The earliest toy books were picture books bound in paper, of six to eight pages, often left blank on the back, with a small amount of text, and coloured illustrations rarely attributed to illustrators. The books were usually bound in heavy paper; some that were guaranteed to be indestructible were bound in linen and sold for a shilling. Toy books were often released as a series, and the most common subjects were popular rhymes and tales.

John Harris took over Newbery's publishing firm at the beginning of the 19th century, and within a few years was producing small (4 inches by 5 inches) books, colorfully illustrated, that were meant to amuse children.

Early toy books, particularly in the 1840s, were hand-coloured often by children apprentices in print-shops, until mechanical colour printing became more prevalent, and toward the end of the century children's books became quite elaborate. In the mid-19th century, the primary publishers of toy books in London were Dean & Son, using popularly coloured chromolithographs for the illustrations. By the end of the 1850s they published more than 200 titles, each book of equal size, each costing sixpence.

The main characteristic of a toy book was that it was a coloured picture book with emphasis on pictures rather than text. Vicki Anderson, author of The Dime Novel in Children's Literature, writes that toy books were both temptingly colourful and not instructive. The books were inexpensive and often were reprints and condensed versions of existing stories such as fairy tales, which were commonly reprinted as toy books, as were books such as Defoe's Robinson Crusoe.

== Later toy books ==
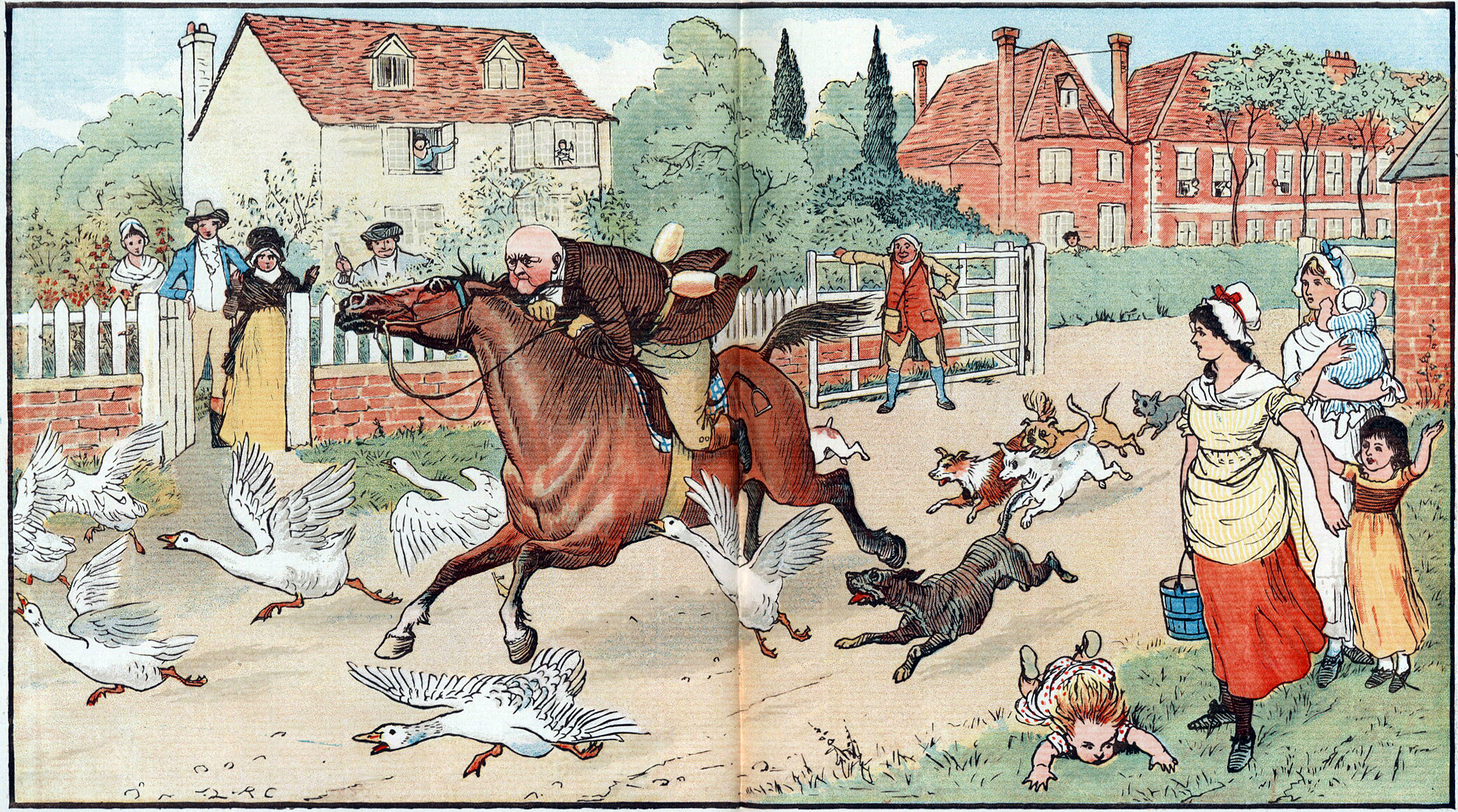
Randolph Caldecott used a double spread (illustration across two pages) for this illustration in The Diverting History of John Gilpin.

Children's illustrated books became fashionable during the Victorian period with an emphasis on the artistic value of the work at a period when the middle and upper classes had funds to spend on books for their offspring. Brightly coloured and well-designed toy books in particular became extremely popular.

When the English publishing house Routledge and Warne contracted with printer Edmund Evans in 1865 to provide toy books for a growing market, the toy books he printed "revolutionized the field of children's books". Large print runs, often exceeding 10,000 for first printings, were necessary. Routledge asserted that each title required sales of 50,000 to be profitable.

When the market for toy books exploded, Evans began publishing them himself, choosing and commissioning the artists to design the illustrations. Walter Crane (1845–1905), Randolph Caldecott (1846–1886), and Kate Greenaway (1846–1901) are the best known illustrators of late-Victorian toybooks, and "did much to develop the sense, the shape, and the look of the modern picture book".

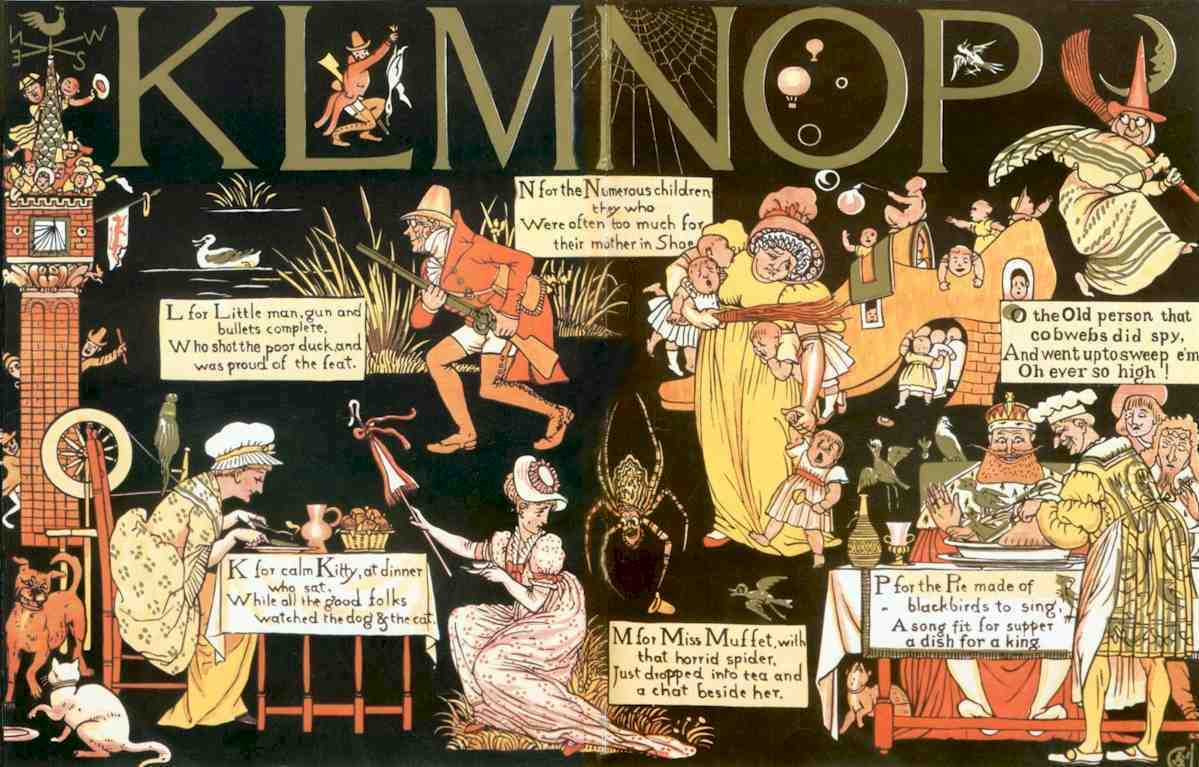
Double spread of Walter Crane's Absurd ABC, published 1874

Evans considered full colour printing, using the relatively inexpensive technique of chromoxylography to be well-suited to the simple illustrations in children's books, He objected to crudely coloured children's book illustrations, which he believed could be beautiful and inexpensive if the print run was large enough. Toy books that were illustrated by Greenaway, Crane and Caldecott, and engraved and printed by Evans, became popular and remain examples of classically illustrated children's literature. The three illustrators became known as the triumvirate of Victoria toy book illustrators and greatly influenced a younger generation of toy book or small book illustrators such as Beatrix Potter.

Books such as The Diverting History of John Gilpin, published in 1878, became popular because of the quality of the illustrations and printing. The Diverting History of John Gilpin, written by William Cowper and first published in 1785, was illustrated by Caldecott and carefully printed in bright colours by Evans. Each page was illustrated and Caldecott's illustrations were designed to make a reader turn to the next page.

Children's literature scholar Anne Lundin explains that at the end of the 19th century, as toy books became more elaborate, contemporary reviewers said of them, "Art for the nursery has become Art indeed", in contrast to books of a few decades earlier, described as "plain and clumsy to ugliness in their exterior". By 1882 the Magazine of Art contrasted ornately illustrated contemporary toy books, characterized by the use of quality paper and good colour printing, to earlier 18th century books produced "when expectations were low". The more elaborate toy books, such as Walter Crane's The Baby's Opera, brought higher prices, selling for as much as five shillings.

== Gallery ==
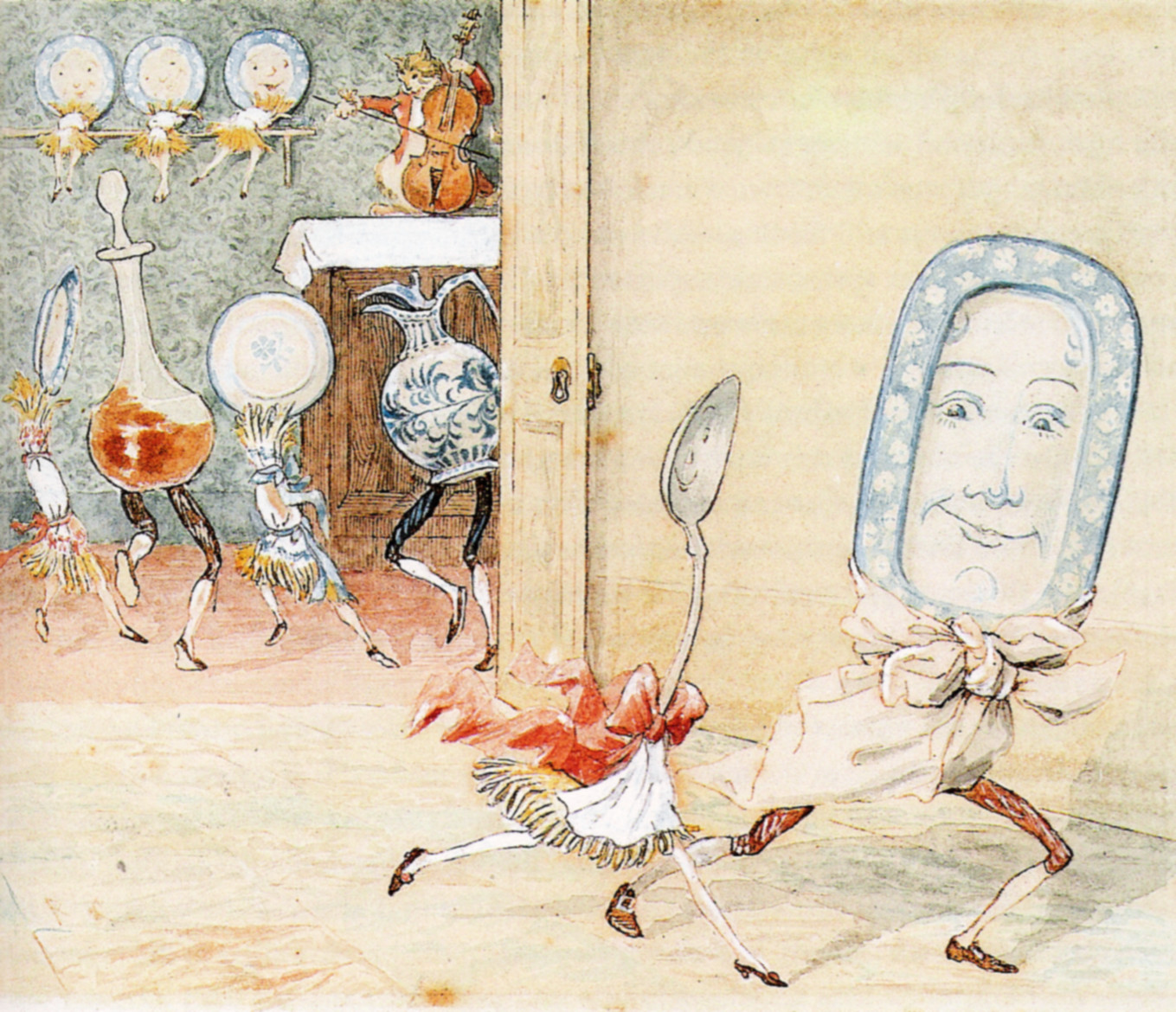
"The spoon runs away with the dish" – a Randolph Caldecott illustration from a nursery rhyme

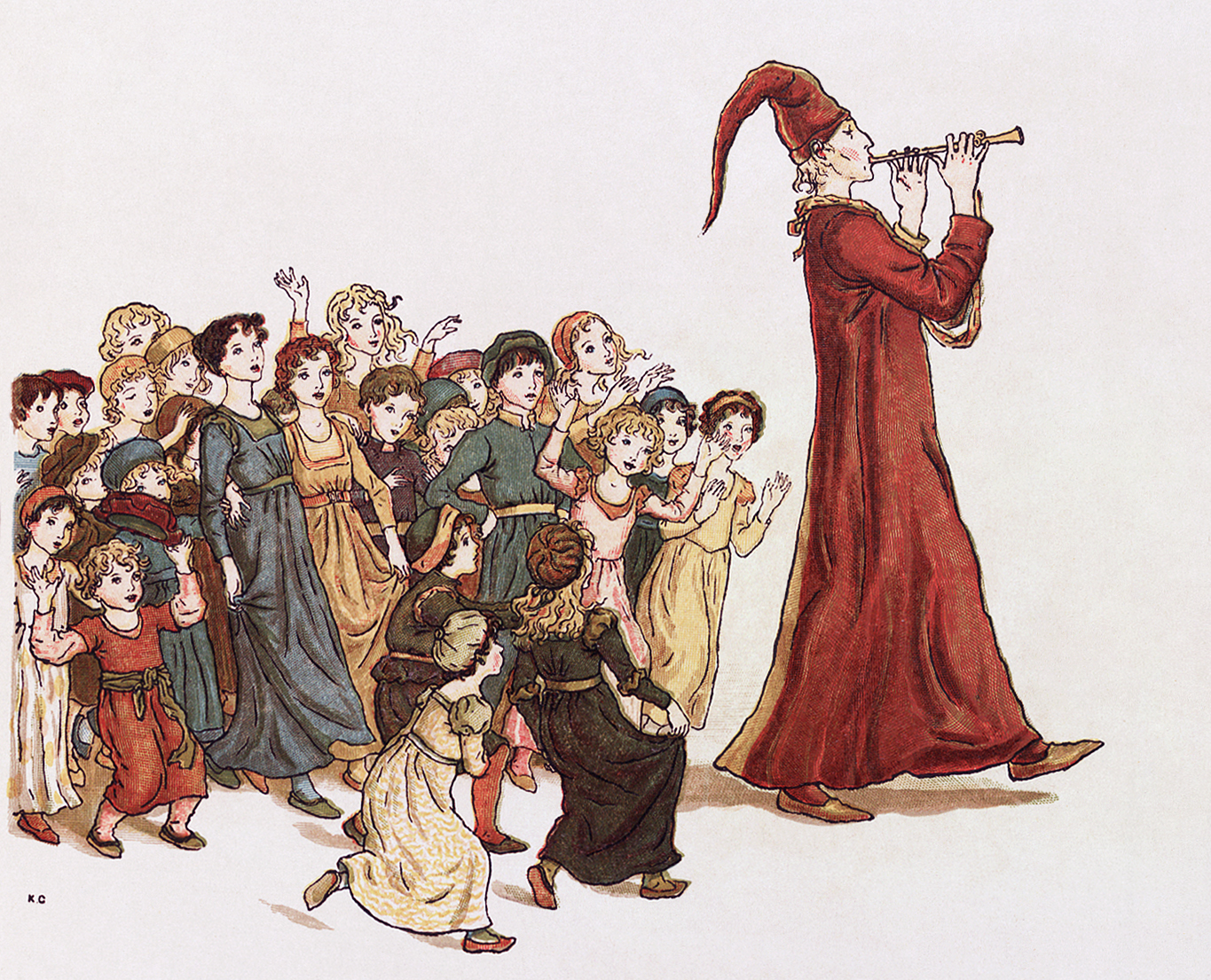
Kate Greenaway's illustration of the Pied Piper leading the children out of Hamelin

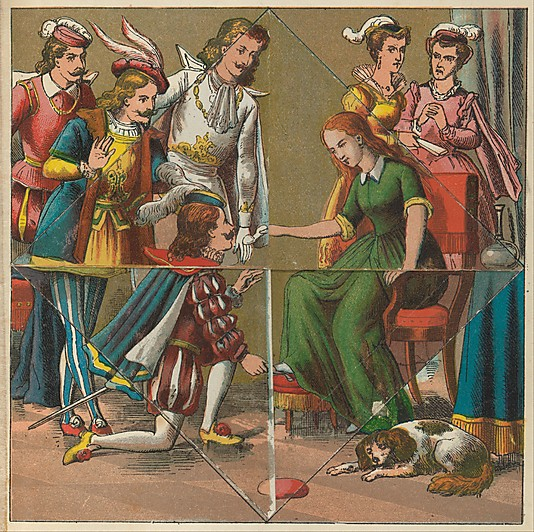
Dean & Son Cinderella surprise picture book

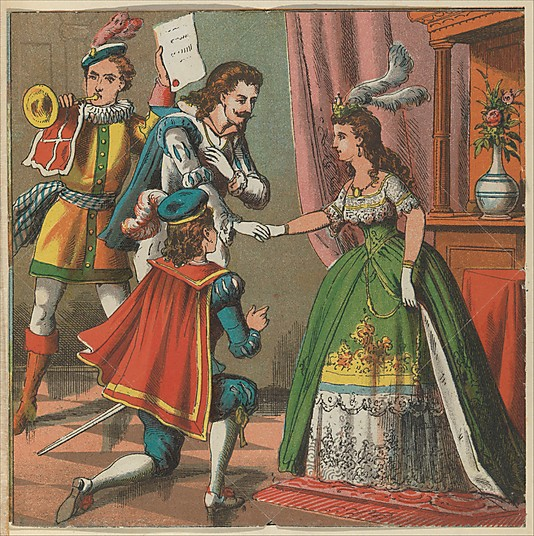
Same book, after folding

== Sources ==
- Anderson, Vicki. (2005). The Dime Novel in Children's Literature. Macfarland. ISBN 978-0-7864-1843-5
- Bodmer, George. (2003). "Victorian Illustrators and their critics". Children's Literature. 31.1, 181–185
- Briggs, Julia, et al. (2008). Popular children's literature in Britain. Aschgate. ISBN 978-1-84014-242-6
- Butts, Dennis. (1995). "The Beginning of Victorianism". in Hunt, Peter (ed). Children's Literature: An Illustrated History. Oxford: Oxford University Press. ISBN 0-19-212320-3
- Carpenter, Humphrey, and Mari Prichard. (1984). The Oxford Companion to Children's Literature. New York: Oxford University Press. ISBN 0-19-211582-0
- Desmarais, Robert J. (2006). Randolph Caldecott: His Books and Illustrations for Young Readers. Alberta: Alberta UP. ISBN 1-55195-207-6
- Hunt, Peter, et al. (1996). International Companion Encyclopedia of Children's Literature. Routledge. ISBN 0-203-16812-7
- Lear, Linda. (2007). Beatrix Potter: A Life in Nature. St Martins. ISBN 978-0-312-37796-0
- McLean, Ruari. (2004). "Evans, Edmund (1826–1905)". Oxford Dictionary of National Biography.
- McLean, Ruari. (1967). "Introduction" in The Reminiscences of Edmund Evans. Oxford University Press.
