= Emerson (surname) =

Emerson is an English surname derived from Anglo-Saxon Emars sunu, meaning "Emar's son" or "Ethelmar's son". Another origin has been suggested as starting with the Old French epic hero Aimeri de Narbonne which passed into Italian as Amerigo and subsequently into English as Emery, Amery, and Imray, among others; Emerson is thought to derived as a patronymic from Emery.

Prominent people who share this surname have been listed below.

== In literature ==
- Alice B. Emerson, pseudonym of the authors of the Betty Gordon and Ruth Fielding children's novel series
- Claudia Emerson (1957–2014), American professor and Pulitzer Prize-winning poet
- Earl Emerson (born 1948), American mystery novelist
- Edward Waldo Emerson (1844–1930), son of Ralph Waldo; physician, writer, artist, and lecturer
- George Barrell Emerson (1797–1881), American educator and pioneer of women's education rights
- Gloria Emerson (1929–2004), American author, journalist and war correspondent.
- Hunt Emerson (born 1952), English cartoonist and graphic novelist
- Kathy Lynn Emerson, American writer of historical and mystery novels and non-fiction
- Kevin Emerson, American author of young adult books
- Mary Moody Emerson (1774–1863), American letter writer and diarist, teacher of her nephew Ralph Waldo Emerson
- Nathaniel Bright Emerson (1839–1915), American physician and author of Hawaiian mythology
- Ralph Waldo Emerson (1803–1882), American writer, philosopher, and transcendentalist
- Sally Emerson, English novelist
- Steven Emerson (born 1954), American print and broadcast investigative journalist
- William Emerson (minister) (1769–1811), American philosopher, father of Ralph Waldo Emerson
- Willis George Emerson (1856–1918) American novelist and author of The Smokey God

== In business ==
- Ernest Emerson (born 1955), American knifemaker and martial arts expert
- Isaac Edward Emerson (1859–1931), American businessman, creator of the headache remedy Bromo-Seltzer
- John Wesley Emerson (1832–1899), American lawyer, historian, Civil War officer, and founder of the Emerson Electric Company
- Raymond Emerson (1886–1977), American civil engineer, investment banker, and faculty at the Peabody Museum of Archaeology and Ethnology
- S. Thomas Emerson (also known as Tom Emerson; born 1941), American entrepreneur, angel investor and educator

== In performing arts ==
- Ashley Emerson (born 1984), American operatic soprano
- August Emerson, American television, film and musical theatre actor
- Avalon Emerson (born 1988), American electronic music producer and DJ
- Billy "The Kid" Emerson (1925–2023), African-American R&B musician
- Darren Emerson (born 1971), British electronic musician
- Donnie and Joe Emerson, American vocal and instrumental duo
- Douglas Emerson (born 1974), American actor
- Eric Emerson (1945–1975), American musician, dancer, and actor
- Faye Emerson (1917–1983), American film actress and television personality
- Frankie Emerson, American indie multi-instrumentalist, member of the rock band The Brian Jonestown Massacre
- Hope Emerson (1897–1960), American film actress
- Jacqueline Emerson (born 1994), American singer and actress
- Keith Emerson (1944–2016), English composer and musician, member of the band Emerson, Lake, and Palmer
- Luther Orlando Emerson (1820–1915), American musician, composer and music publisher
- Max Emerson (born 1988), American actor, model, author, director and YouTuber
- Michael Emerson (born 1954), American stage and screen actor
- Stuart Emerson, UK guitarist associated with his own band, Emerson, and Meat Loaf

== In politics ==
- Andrew L. Emerson, American politician, member of the Maine House of Representatives (1828–1829), first Mayor of Portland, Maine (1832)
- Arthur Emerson, 21st Governor of American Samoa
- Bill Emerson (1938–1996), aka Norvell William Emerson, American US congressman from Missouri
- Clarence Emerson (1901–1963), Canadian merchant and politician, senator (1957–1963)
- Craig Emerson (born 1954), Australian Labor Party representative from Queensland
- David Emerson (born 1945), Canadian politician, businessman, civil servant
- Frank Emerson (1882–1931), American politician, former governor of the US state of Wyoming
- Hugh A. Emerson (1793–1860), lawyer and politician in Newfoundland, member of the Newfoundland House of Assembly (1837–1842)
- James Emerson (1895–1917), British Army officer, posthumous recipient of the Victoria Cross
- James A. Emerson (1865–1922), New York politician
- Jo Ann Emerson (born 1950), American congresswoman from Missouri, and widow of former congressman Bill Emerson
- John Emerson (mayor) (1859–1932), Canadian politician; former mayor of Calgary, Alberta
- Julie Emerson (born 1988), American politician
- Junius Emerson (1926–1992), American politician, member of the Pennsylvania House of Representatives (1965–1968, 1981–1982)
- Lewis Edward Emerson (1890–1949), lawyer, judge and politician, first Chief Justice of Newfoundland and Labrador (1944–1949)
- Louis W. Emerson (1857–1924), US congressman from New York
- Newton Emerson (born c. 1970), Northern Irish political commentator and satirist
- Peter Emerson (born 1943 or 1944), Northern Irish political activist
- Prescott Emerson (1840–1889), lawyer and politician in Newfoundland, speaker of the Newfoundland and Labrador House of Assembly (1874–1878)
- Rupert Emerson (1899–1979), American professor of political science and international relations
- Herbert William Emerson (1881–1962), governor of Punjab, British India

== In law ==
- Thomas I. Emerson (1907–1991), American attorney, law professor, and First Amendment rights experts

== In science and education ==
- Alfred E. Emerson (1896–1976), American biologist
- Barbara Emerson, English historian and biographer
- Benjamin Kendall Emerson (1843–1932), American geologist and author
- Beverly M. Emerson, American biochemist
- Caryl Emerson, American literary critic, slavist and translator.
- Charles Wesley Emerson (1837–1908), founder and first president of Emerson College
- E. Allen Emerson (born 1954), computer scientist
- Ellen Russell Emerson (1837–1907), American ethnologist, author
- Gladys Anderson Emerson (1903–1984), American historian, biochemist and nutritionist
- John Haven Emerson (1906–1997), American inventor of biomedical devices
- Oliver Farrar Emerson (1860–1927), American philologist and educator
- Ralph Emerson (theologian) (1787–1863), Professor of Ecclesiastical History and Pastoral Theology in the Andover Theological Seminary
- Ralph Emerson (botanist) (1912–1979), American botanist and mycologist
- Rollins A. Emerson (1873–1947), American geneticist
- Sharon Emerson (born 1945), American biologist
- William Emerson (mathematician) (1701–1782), English eccentric, scientist and philosopher
- William Henry Emerson (1860–1924), American chemist
- William Keith Emerson (1925–2016) American malacologist

== In sport ==
- Alan Emerson (born 1957), British motorcycle speedway rider
- Antony Emerson (1963–2016), Australian tennis player
- Chester Emerson (1889–1971), American Major League Baseball player for Philadelphia Athletics
- Colt Emerson (born 2005), American baseball player
- David Emerson (born 1961), Australian cricketer
- Denise Emerson (born 1960), Australian cricketer
- Denny Emerson (Edward E. Emerson; born 1941), American equestrian
- Eddie Emerson (1892–1970), Canadian football player
- Gary Emerson (born 1963), English golfer and winner of the 2004 Russian Open
- Grady Emerson (born 2008), American baseball player
- Hugh Emerson (born 1973), Irish Gaelic footballer
- June Emerson (1924–1990), Canadian baseball player
- Martin Emerson (born 2000), American football player
- Nat Emerson (1874–1958), American tennis player
- Nelson Emerson (born 1967), Canadian right wing hockey player formerly in the National Hockey League
- Niamh Emerson (born 1999), English heptathlete
- Norman Emerson (cricketer) (born 1939), Australian cricketer
- Ox Emerson (Gover Conner Emerson; 1907–1998), American football player
- Rob Emerson (born 1981), American mixed martial artist
- Ross Emerson (born 1954), Australian international cricket umpire
- Roy Emerson (born 1936), Australian tennis player
- Scott Emerson (baseball) (born 1971), American baseball player, coach and pitching instructor

== In visual arts ==
- Arthur Webster Emerson, American/Hawaiian painter
- Edith Emerson (1888–1981), American painter
- Ken Emerson (1927–2010), Australian cartoonist and comic strip creator
- Peter Henry Emerson (1856–1936), Cuban-born British photographer
- Sarah Emerson, American artist
- William Ralph Emerson (1833–1917), Shingle-style American architect
- William Otto Emerson (1856–1940), American painter and ornithologist

== Fictional characters ==
- Evelyn Emerson, character in the Amelia Peabody novel series by Elizabeth Peters
- Nefret Emerson, character in the Amelia Peabody novel series by Elizabeth Peters
- Radcliffe Emerson, character in the Amelia Peabody novel series by Elizabeth Peters
- Michael Emerson, a character in The Lost Boys
- Sam Emerson, a character in The Lost Boys
- Lucy Emerson, a character in The Lost Boys
- Paul Emerson (Stargate SG-1), a character in Stargate SG-1

== Other ==
- Eben Emerson, American lighthouse keeper at Wood Island Light, Maine (1861–1865)
- Haven Emerson (1875–1957), American physician
- Ida Emerson, Broadway composer and lyricist
- Jimmy Coleman, better known as J. Paul Emerson (died 2001), American radio host
- Jared Emerson-Johnson (born 1981), American video game music composer, sound designer, voice director and voice actor
- Jodi Emerson (born 1972), anti-human trafficking advocate
- Joseph Emerson (1821–1900), American minister and theologian
- Lidian Jackson Emerson (1802–1892), second wife of Ralph Waldo Emerson
- Mark T. Emerson, United States Navy rear admiral, commanded of the Naval Strike and Air Warfare Center (2006–2009)
- Meredith Emerson, American murdered whilst hiking on Blood Mountain
- Norman Emerson (1900–1966), Irish Anglican priest
- Rick Emerson (also known as Rick Taylor; born 1973), American radio host
- Ursula Newell Emerson (1806–1888), American missionary in the Hawaiian Islands, co-founder of the Waialua Protestant Church
- Zelie Emerson (1883–1969), American suffragette in England

== See also ==
- Charles Emmerson (disambiguation), various people
- Cherry Logan Emerson (disambiguation), various people
- Edward Emerson (disambiguation), various people
- George Emerson (disambiguation), various people
- Henry Emerson (disambiguation), various people
- John Emerson (disambiguation), various people
- Robert Emerson (disambiguation), various people
- Stephen Emerson (disambiguation), various people
- Tom Emerson (disambiguation), various people
- William Emerson (disambiguation), various people
- Ambro Emerson (1983–2002), Canadian champion trotting horse
- Emmerson (disambiguation)
