= William Emerson =

William Emerson may refer to:

== Architects ==
- William Emerson (American architect) (1873–1957), first dean of the MIT School of Architecture
- William Emerson (British architect) (1843–1924)
- William Ralph Emerson (1833–1917), American Shingle-style architect

== Others ==
- William Emerson (mathematician) (1701–1782), English mathematician
- William Emerson Sr. (1743–1776), British American minister and grandfather of Ralph Waldo Emerson
- William Emerson (minister) (1769–1811), American minister and father of Ralph Waldo Emerson
- William N. Emerson (1821–1891), American politician from New York
- William Henry Emerson (1860–1924), American chemist
- William Emerson (footballer) (1891–1961), British footballer for Burnley and Glentoran
- William A. Emerson (1921–2017), senior vice president and national sales director of Merrill Lynch
- William Emerson (journalist) (1923–2009), American journalist
- William Keith Emerson (1925–2016), American malacologist
- Bill Emerson (1938–1996), American politician from Missouri
- Bill Emerson (musician) (1938–2021), American country music performer
- Billy "The Kid" Emerson (1925–2023), American R&B and rock and roll singer and songwriter

== See also ==
- Emerson (surname)
- William Emmerson (1801–1868), English cricketer
- Bill Emmerson (born 1945), American politician from California
