= Ralph Emerson (disambiguation) =

Ralph Waldo Emerson (1803–1882) was an American philosopher and essayist.

Ralph Emerson may also refer to:

- Ralph Emerson (theologian) (1787–1863), American Congregational pastor in Norfolk, Connecticut
- Ralph Emerson (botanist) (1912–1979), American botanist, academic, and professor at the University of California, Berkeley
- William Ralph Emerson (1833–1917), American architect
- Ralph Emerson (actor) (1899–1984), American actor
- Ralph Waldo Emerson Jones (1905–1982), American educator and baseball coach

== See also ==
- Emerson (surname)
