= S. J. Higginson =

American author

- Born: January 15, 1840; Chester County
- Died: March 21, 1916 (aged 76); New York City
- Spouse(s): J. C. F. van Heerdt, Stephen Higginson III

Sarah Jane Hatfield Krauser van Heerdt Higginson, Baroness van Heerdt (January 15, 1840 – March 21, 1916) was an American author who published under the name S. J. Higginson.

She was born Sarah Jane Hatfield on January 15, 1840 in Chester County, Pennsylvania, the daughter of John Hatfield and Eleanor Nutt Hatfield. Her works include the lost race novel A Princess of Java: A Tale of the Far East (1887) and the children's travel book Java, the Pearl of the East (1890).

S. J. Higginson died on 21 March 1916 in New York City.

== Personal life ==
Her first marriage was to a man named Krauser and they had two children, Oscar and Florence. On September 24, 1866, in Baltimore, Maryland, she married the Dutch jurist Jacob Carel Frederik, Baron van Heerdt (1819-1878). They lived in the Dutch East Indies and had a son, who died young; the couple divorced in 1870. On May 15, 1874, in Brooklyn, New York, she married Stephen Higginson III, a coffee importer and diplomat. They had one son, Stephen.

== Bibliography ==
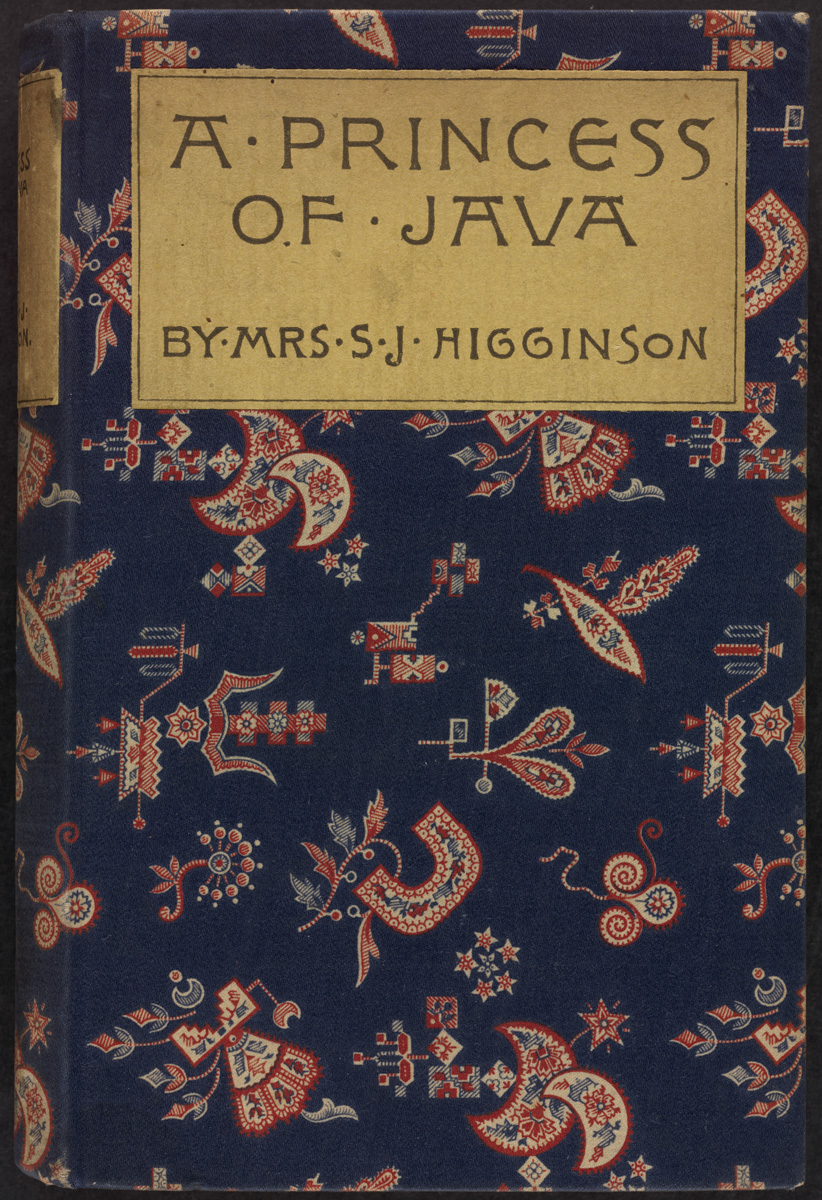
A princess of Java

- A Princess of Java: A Tale of the Far East (1887)
- Java, the Pearl of the East (1890)
- The Bedouin Girl (1894)
