= Lost world =

Subgenre of the fantasy or science fiction genres

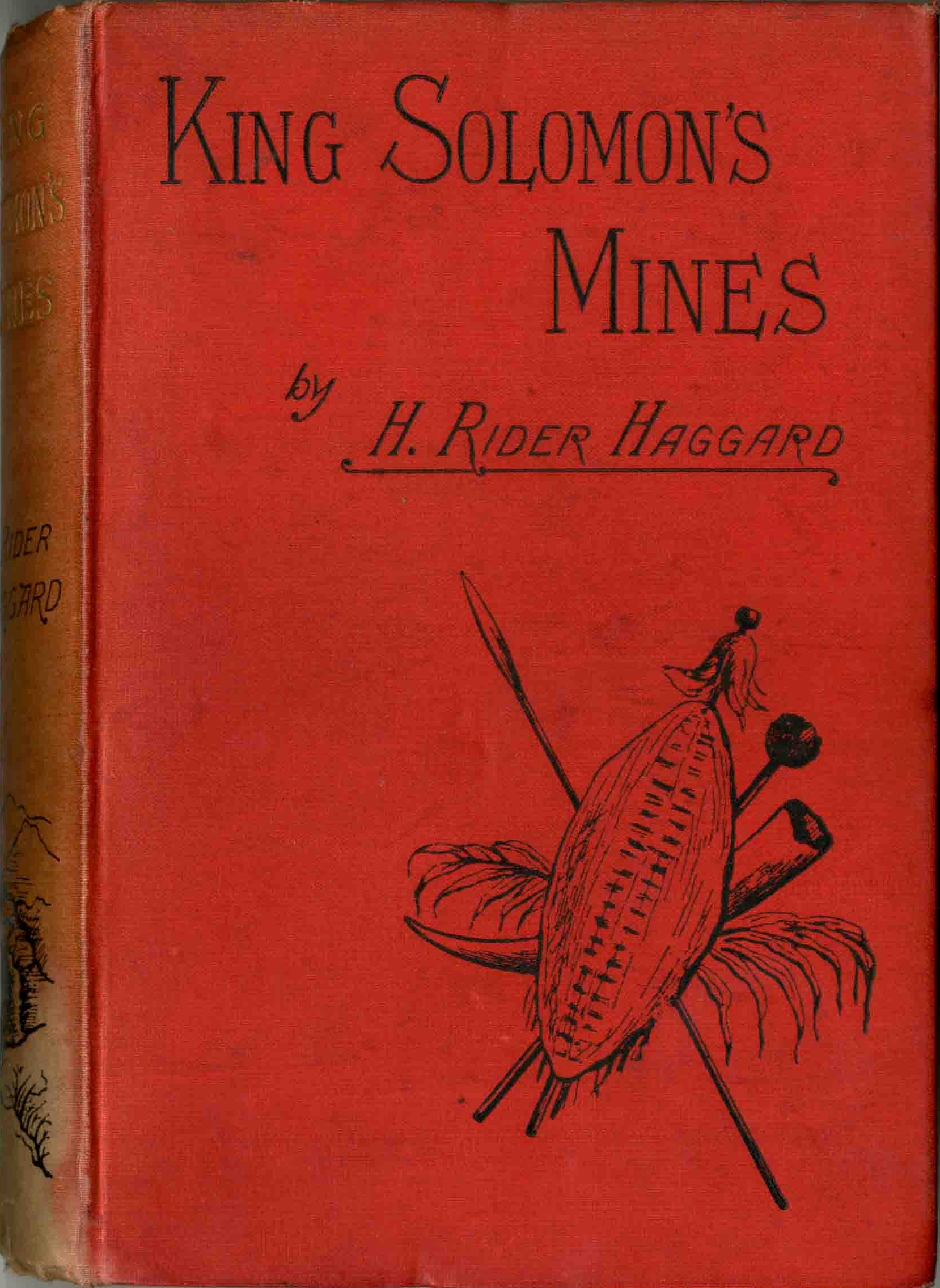
First Edition Cover of King Solomon's Mines, by H. Rider Haggard considered by some the first lost world narrative.

Lost world is a subgenre of the fantasy or science fiction genres that involves the discovery of an unknown Earth civilization and/or lands with creatures thought to be extinct. It began as a subgenre of the late-Victorian adventure romance and remains popular into the 21st century.

The genre arose during an era when Western archaeologists discovered and studied civilizations around the world previously unknown to them, through disciplines such as Egyptology, Assyriology, or Mesoamerican studies. Thus, real stories of archaeological finds inspired writings on the topic. Between 1871 and the First World War, the number of published lost world narratives, set in every continent, increased significantly.

The genre has similar themes to "mythical kingdoms", such as Atlantis and El Dorado.

== History ==
King Solomon's Mines (1885) by H. Rider Haggard is sometimes considered the first lost world narrative. Haggard's novel shaped the form and influenced later lost world narratives, including Rudyard Kipling's The Man Who Would Be King (1888), Arthur Conan Doyle's The Lost World (1912), Edgar Rice Burroughs' The Land That Time Forgot (1918), A. Merritt's The Moon Pool (1918), and H. P. Lovecraft's At the Mountains of Madness (1931).

Earlier works, such as Edward Bulwer-Lytton's Vril: The Power of the Coming Race (1871) and Samuel Butler's Erewhon (1872) use a similar plot as a vehicle for Swiftian social satire rather than romantic adventure. Other early examples are Simon Tyssot de Patot's Voyages et Aventures de Jacques Massé (1710), which includes a prehistoric fauna and flora, and Robert Paltock's The Life and Adventures of Peter Wilkins (1751), an 18th-century imaginary voyage inspired by both Defoe and Swift, in which a man named Peter Wilkins discovers a race of winged people on an isolated island surrounded by high cliffs as in Burroughs's Caspak. The 1820 Hollow Earth novel Symzonia has also been cited as the first of the lost world form, and Jules Verne's Journey to the Center of the Earth (1864) and The Village in the Treetops (1901) popularized the theme of surviving pockets of prehistoric species. J.-H. Rosny aîné would later publish The Amazing Journey of Hareton Ironcastle (1922), a novel where an expedition in the heart of Africa discovers a mysterious area with an ecosystem from another world, with alien flora and fauna. Edgar Allan Poe's The Narrative of Arthur Gordon Pym of Nantucket (1838) has certain lost world elements towards the end of the tale.

James Hilton's Lost Horizon (1933) enjoyed popular success in using the genre as a takeoff for popular philosophy and social comment. It introduced the name Shangri-La, a meme for the idealization of the lost world as a Paradise. Similar books where the inhabitants of the lost world are seen as superior to the outsiders, are Joseph O'Neill's Land under England (1935) and Douglas Valder Duff's Jack Harding’s Quest (1939).

Hergé also explores the theme in his Tintin comics The Seven Crystal Balls and Prisoners of the Sun (1944–48). Here the protagonists encounter an unknown Inca kingdom in the Andes.

== Contemporary examples ==
Contemporary American novelist Michael Crichton invokes this tradition in his novel Congo (1980), which involves a quest for King Solomon's mines, fabled to be in a lost African city called Zinj. During the 1990s, James Gurney published a series of juvenile novels about a lost island called Dinotopia, in which humans live alongside living dinosaurs.

In video games, it is most notably present in the Tomb Raider, Assassin's Creed, and Uncharted franchises. It is parodied in EarthBound as one of the game's many references to American culture and mythology.

The Hanna-Barbera action cartoon Space Ghost features a segment "Dino Boy in the Lost Valley", about a young boy named Todd who survives a plane crash and lands in a hidden prehistoric valley in South America. In another Hanna-Barbera cartoon Valley of the Dinosaurs science professor John Butler and his family - wife Kim, teenage daughter Katie, young son Greg, and dog Digger - are on a rafting trip along the Amazon River in an uncharted river canyon when they are suddenly swept through a cavern and caught in a whirlpool. Upon resurfacing, they find themselves in a mysterious realm where humans coexist with various prehistoric creatures, including dinosaurs. The Butlers meet and befriend a clan of Neanderthal cavepeople.

In movies, the Indiana Jones franchise makes use of similar concepts. Also comics make use of the idea, such as the Savage Land in Marvel Comics and Themyscira in DC Comics.

== Geographic settings ==
Early lost world novels were typically set in parts of the world as yet unexplored by Europeans. Favorite locations were the interior of Africa (many of Haggard's novels, Burroughs' Tarzan novels) or inland South America (Doyle's The Lost World, Merritt's The Face in the Abyss), as well as Central Asia (Kipling's The Man Who Would Be King, Haggard's Ayesha: The Return of She, Merritt's The Metal Monster, Hilton's Lost Horizon) and Australia (James Francis Hogan's The Lost Explorer and Eureka by Owen Hall (pseudonym of New Zealand politician Hugh Lusk)).

Later writers favored Antarctica, especially as a refuge for prehistoric species. Burroughs' The Land That Time Forgot and its sequels were set on the island of Caprona (a.k.a. Caspak) in the Southern Ocean. In Edison Marshall's Dian of the Lost Land (1935), Cro-Magnons, Neanderthals, and mammoths survive in the "Moss Country", a sheltered warm corner of the continent. Dennis Wheatley's novel The Man Who Missed the War (1945) also deals with a warm and hidden area on the continent, where there live humans such as the descendants of Atlantis. In Jeremy Robinson's Antarktos Rising (2007), dinosaurs and Nephilim emerge as the icecap melts. Mat Johnson's Pym (2011) describes giant white hominids living in ice caves. Ian Cameron's The Mountains at the Bottom of the World (1972) has a relict population of Paranthropus living not quite in Antarctica, but in the southern Chilean Andes. Crusoe Warburton (1954), by Victor Wallace Germains, describes an island in the far South Atlantic, with a lost, pre-gunpowder empire.

According to Allienne Becker, there was a logical evolution from the lost world subgenre to the planetary romance genre: "When there were no longer any unexplored corners of our earth, the Lost Worlds Romance turned to space."

Brian Stableford makes a related point about Lost Worlds: "The motif has gradually fallen into disuse by virtue of increasing geographical knowledge; these days lost lands have to be very well hidden indeed or displaced beyond some kind of magical or dimensional boundary. Such displacement [...] so transforms their significance that they are better thought of as Secondary Worlds or Otherworlds."

Below is a list of classic lost world titles drawn from Lost Worlds: The Ultimate Anthology. Titles were selected from 333: A Bibliography of the Science-Fantasy Novel, Jessica Amanda Salmonson's Lost Race Checklist and E. F. Bleiler's Science-fiction, the Early Years.

=== Lost worlds in Africa ===
- King Solomon's Mines by Sir H. Rider Haggard
- She: A History of Adventure by Sir H. Rider Haggard
- Allan Quatermain by Sir H. Rider Haggard
- The People of the Mist by Sir H. Rider Haggard
- Benita: An African Romance by Sir H. Rider Haggard
- The Ghost Kings by Sir H. Rider Haggard
- The Yellow God: An Idol of Africa by Sir H. Rider Haggard
- Queen Sheba's Ring by Sir H. Rider Haggard
- The Holy Flower by Sir H. Rider Haggard
- The Ivory Child by Sir H. Rider Haggard
- She and Allan by Sir H. Rider Haggard
- Heu-Heu; or, The Monster by Sir H. Rider Haggard
- The Treasure of the Lake by Sir H. Rider Haggard
- The Return of Tarzan (and many other Tarzan books) by Edgar Rice Burroughs
- A Rip Van Winkle of the Kalahari by Frederick Carruthers Cornell
- The Great White Queen: A Tale of Treasure and Treason by William Le Queux
- By the Gods Beloved (also known as The Gates of Kamt) by Baroness Orczy
- Wings of Danger by Arthur A. Nelson

=== Lost worlds in North America ===
- The Aztec Treasure House by Thomas A. Janvier
- Fruit of the Desert by Richard Hayes Barry
- The Haunted Mesa by Louis L'Amour
- The Mound by H.P. Lovecraft

=== Lost worlds in Central America ===
- Phantom City: A Volcanic Romance by William Westall
- The Lost Canyon of the Toltecs by Charles Sumner Seeley
- Heart of the World by Sir H. Rider Haggard
- The Bridge of Light by A. Hyatt Verrill

=== Lost worlds in South America ===
- The Country of the Blind by H. G. Wells
- The Lost World by Sir Arthur Conan Doyle
- The Web of the Sun by T. S. Stribling
- Immortal Athalia by Harry F. Haley
- Prisoners of the Sun by Hergé
- Under The Andes by Rex Stout, 1914, This is the same author that wrote the Nero Wolfe detective series.

=== Lost worlds in Asia ===
- The Man Who Would Be King by Rudyard Kipling
- The Mountain Kingdom: A Narrative of Adventure by David Lawson Johnstone
- Om: The Secret of Abhor Valley by Talbot Mundy
- Lost Horizon by James Hilton
- The Valley of Eyes Unseen by Gilbert Henry Collins
- Harilek: A Romance of Modern Central Asia by Ganpat (Louis Gompertz)
- Fields of Sleep by E. C. Vivian
- The Purple Sapphire by John Taine
- The Metal Monster by A. Merritt
- The Rose of Tibet by Lionel Davidson

=== Lost worlds in Europe and the Middle East ===
- No-Man’s-Land by John Buchan
- The Knight of the Silver Star by Percy James Brebner
- The Nameless City by H.P. Lovecraft

=== Lost worlds in Australia ===
- The Lost Explorer by James Francis Hogan
- Marooned on Australia by Ernest Favenc
- Eureka by Owen Hall

=== Lost worlds at the Poles ===
- The Narrative of Arthur Gordon Pym of Nantucket by Edgar Allan Poe
- Beyond The Great South Wall by Frank Savile
- The Ke Whonkus People: A Story of the North Pole Country by John O. Greene
- The Land That Time Forgot by Edgar Rice Burroughs
- The Lost Ones by Ian Cameron
- At the Mountains of Madness by H.P. Lovecraft
- The Ice People by René Barjavel
- The Greatest Adventure by John Taine
- Polaris of the Snows by Charles B. Stilson
- The Smoky God by Willis George Emerson
- A Strange Manuscript Found in a Copper Cylinder by James De Mille

=== Hollow Earth ===
- At the Earth's Core (and its sequels) by Edgar Rice Burroughs
- The Coming Race by Edward Bulwer-Lytton
- Under the Auroras: A Marvelous Tale of the Interior World by William Jenkins Shaw
- The Moon Pool by A. Merritt
- Dwellers in the Mirage by A. Merritt
- Zanthodon by Lin Carter
- Journey to the Centre of the Earth by Jules Verne

== See also ==
- Lost city (fiction)
- Tolkien and Edwardian adventure stories
- Lost world films (category)
