= Gilbert Collins (disambiguation) =

Gilbert Collins was a 19th-century mayor of Jersey City.

Gilbert Collins may also refer to:

- Gilbert Henry Collins, author
- Gilbert G. Collins, 19th-century mayor of Columbus, Ohio
