= Cherry Logan Emerson =

Cherry Logan Emerson may refer to:

- Cherry Logan Emerson (engineer) (1888–1959), Georgia Tech Dean of Engineering, 1945–1955
- Cherry Logan Emerson (chemist) (1916–2007), his son, Atlanta chemist, businessman, and philanthropist
