= Edward Emerson =

Edward Emerson may refer to:

- Denny Emerson (Edward E. Emerson, born 1941), American equestrian
- Eddie Emerson (1892–1970), Canadian football player
- Edward Emerson (priest) (1838–1926), Archdeacon of Cork
- Edward Waldo Emerson (1844–1930), American physician, writer and lecturer
