= John Emmerson =

John Emmerson may refer to:

- John Emmerson (cricketer), English cricketer
- John K. Emmerson, American diplomat
- John McLaren Emmerson, Australian physicist, barrister, and collector of rare books

== See also ==
- John Emerson (disambiguation)
