= Stephen Emerson =

Stephen or Steven Emerson may refer to:

- Stephen G. Emerson (born 1953), American scientist
- Steven Emerson (born 1954), American writer
- Stephen Emerson (author) (born 1950), American fiction and prose writer
- Steve Emerson (visual effects artist), American special effects supervisor

== See also ==
- Emerson (surname)
