= Victor Wallace Germains =

English writer

Victor Wallace Germains (8 May 1888 – 1974) was an English writer. He wrote several books on the military and foreign policy, including on Kitchener and Churchill.

Germains was born in the Fulham district of London, the son of inventor Aaron Simon "Adolph" Zalkin Germains, a Jewish emigrant from the Russian Empire. His mother was Emma Annie Levetus of Birmingham, daughter of a Moldavian Jewish emigrant, and sister of the writer Amelia Sarah Levetus.

In 1954, Germains wrote Crusoe Warburton, a lost world novel.

During World War I, Germains served as a spy in Austria.

He died in 1974 in South Africa.

== Writings ==
As a military writer, Germains was classed by Michael Howard with Bernard Acworth and Lionel Charlton as a lesser figure typical of his time.

=== Books ===
- The Struggle for Bread, 1913 (a reply under the pseudonym "Rifleman" to Norman Angell's The Great Illusion (1910).
- The Gathering Storm, 1913 (under the pseudonym "Rifleman"
- Austria of Today: with a special chapter on the Austrian police, 1923 (later editions up to 1932)
- The Truth about Kitchener, 1925
- The "Mechanization" of War, 1927; a contribution to the "tank debate", arguing that anti-tank weapons had greater potential for development, foreword by Frederick Barton Maurice. The work was critical of the approach of J. F. C. Fuller, presaging later British doctrine, and was serialized abroad.
- The Kitchener Armies: the story of a national achievement, 1930
- The Tragedy of Winston Churchill, 1931
- Colonel to Princess. A novel., 1936. A dying princess gets a brain transplant from a colonel. He enjoys being a woman.
- Crusoe Warburton, 1954

=== Articles ===
- "(Warfare of Tomorrow part II) The Cult of the Defensive" pp. 498–502, The Living Age, February 1938
- "Not to Overlook the Infantry", pp. 233–237, The Living Age, November 1940
