= Denny Emerson =

American equestrian

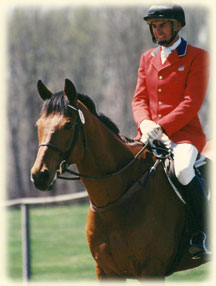
Emerson in his "Pink Coat".

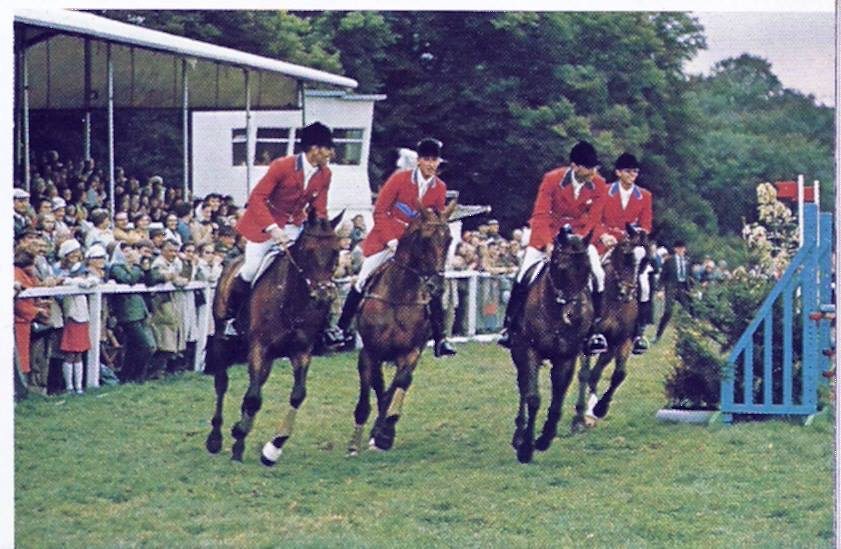
Emerson during the Victory Gallop at the 1974 World Championships where he helped the US team capture the gold medal.

Denny Emerson (born August 20, 1941) is an American equestrian. He is the only equestrian to have won both an international gold medal in eventing and a spelling bee. In 1972, Emerson was named United States Eventing Association's Rider of the Year. He was a member of the United States Three Day Eventing Team that won the gold medal at the 1974 Eventing World Championships. As of 2015, Emerson operates as a clinician and trainer. He is a regular contributor to The Chronicle of the Horse's "Between Rounds" column. He and his wife, May Emerson, run Tamarack Hill Farm in Strafford, Vermont.

== Riding career ==
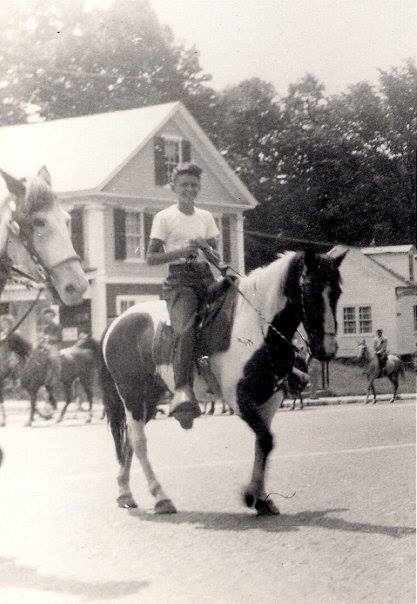
Emerson riding his first pony, Paint, in the 1950s.

Emerson grew up in Massachusetts and began riding around the age of nine at the Stoneleigh-Burnham School in Greenfield, Massachusetts, where his father was headmaster. Emerson began competing in gymkhanas in 1954, at the age of 12. At the age of 15 he rode in his first 100-mile endurance ride at the Green Mountain Horse Association (GMHA) in South Woodstock, Vermont. He began eventing in 1961 at the age of 20. His first event was a preliminary three-day at GMHA.

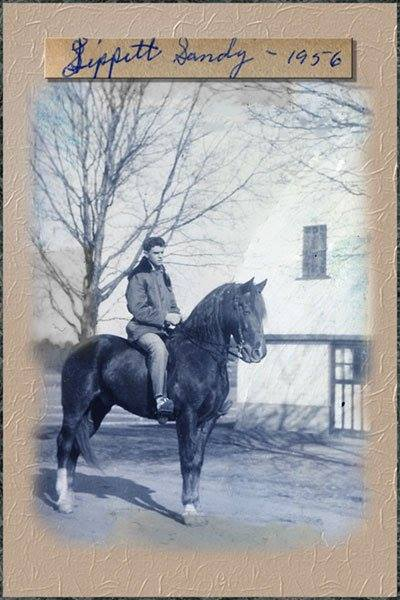
Emerson on the Morgan Lippitt Sandy in 1956

In 1965 Emerson moved up to the Intermediate Level on his first event horse Lighting Magic, and by 1971 he had moved up to the Advanced Level on Cat. Emerson and Cat competed in their first advanced three-day at Dunham, Quebec.

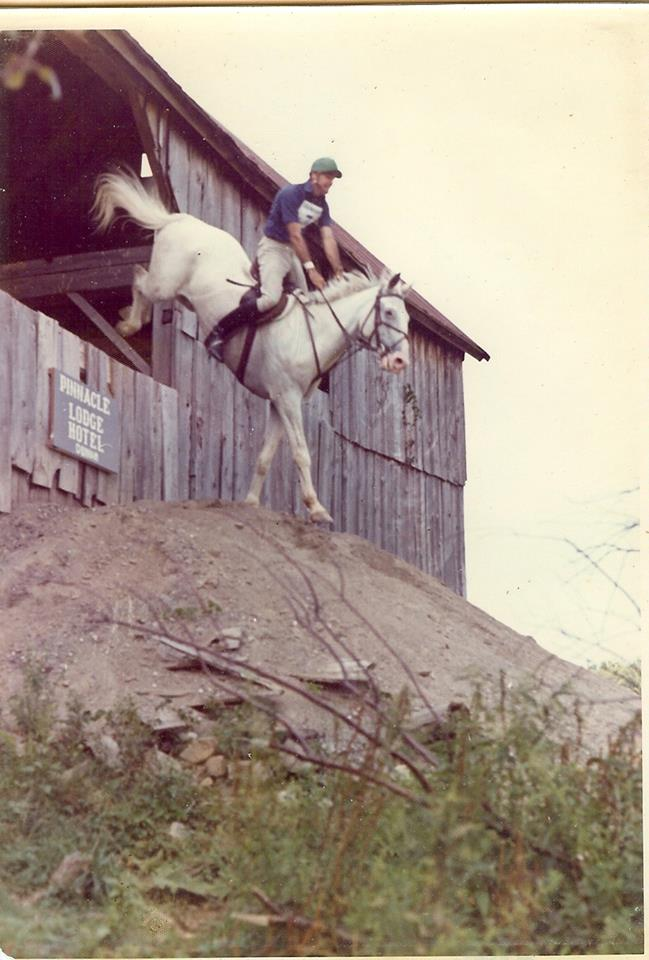
Emerson on Cat at his first Advanced Event in 1971 at Dunham

In 1972, Emerson was named the United States Eventing Association's Rider of the Year. Two years later, in 1974, Emerson and his part-Morgan horse, Viktor Dakin, rode a clean cross country round at the Burghley Horse Trials World Championship Three Day Event, that helped secure a team gold medal for the United States Eventing Team. The team included Bruce Davidson on Irish Cap, Michael Plumb on Good Mixture and Don Sachey on Plain Sailing. In 1976 Emerson and Viktor Dakin were named to the reserve team for the 1976 Montreal Olympics at Bromont. Viktor Dakin had strained a ligament just before the competition. That same year Emerson and Viktor Dakin won the National Three Day Event Championships at Radnor.

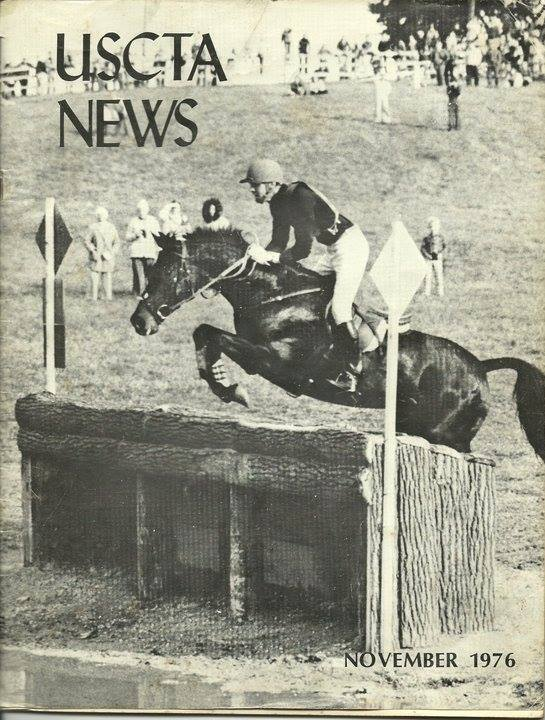
Emerson on Viktor Dakin on the cover the November 1976 edition of USCTA News

Emerson won the National Three Day Event Championship again in 1979 at Chesterland riding York. York was then named USEA's 1979 "Horse of the Year". In 1982 Emerson placed fourth at the US National Three Day Event at Chesterland, riding Farnley Rob Roy. In 1992, Emerson won the Bromont CCI** event. Emerson competed at his final advanced three day at Groton House Farm in South Hamilton, Massachusetts in 1999 at the age of 58. His advanced career lasted 29 seasons.

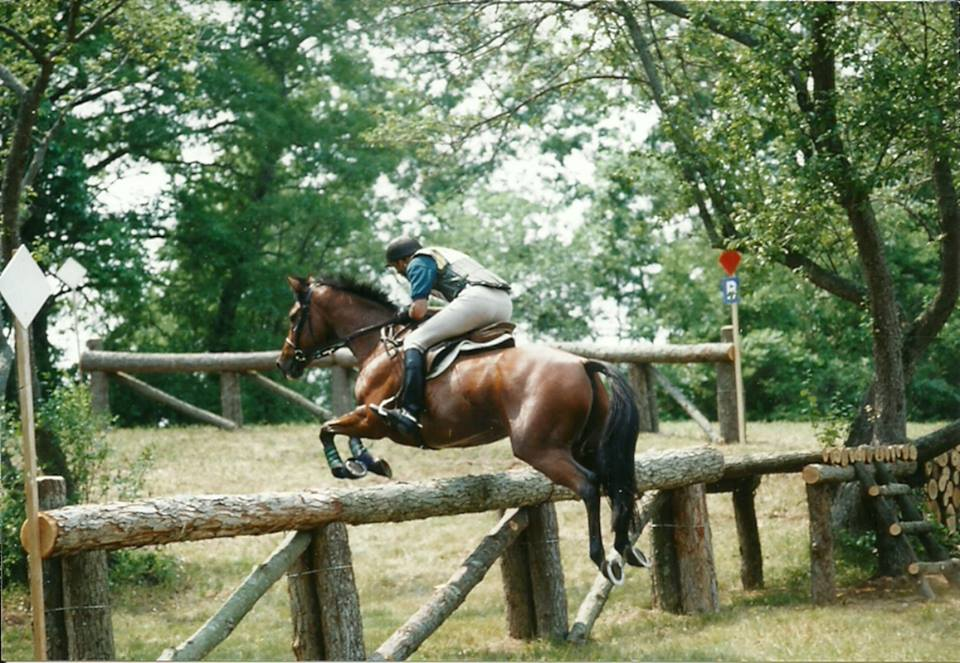
Emerson riding Speed Axel at the Groton House Farm Horse Trials in 1999. This was Emerson's last Advanced event.

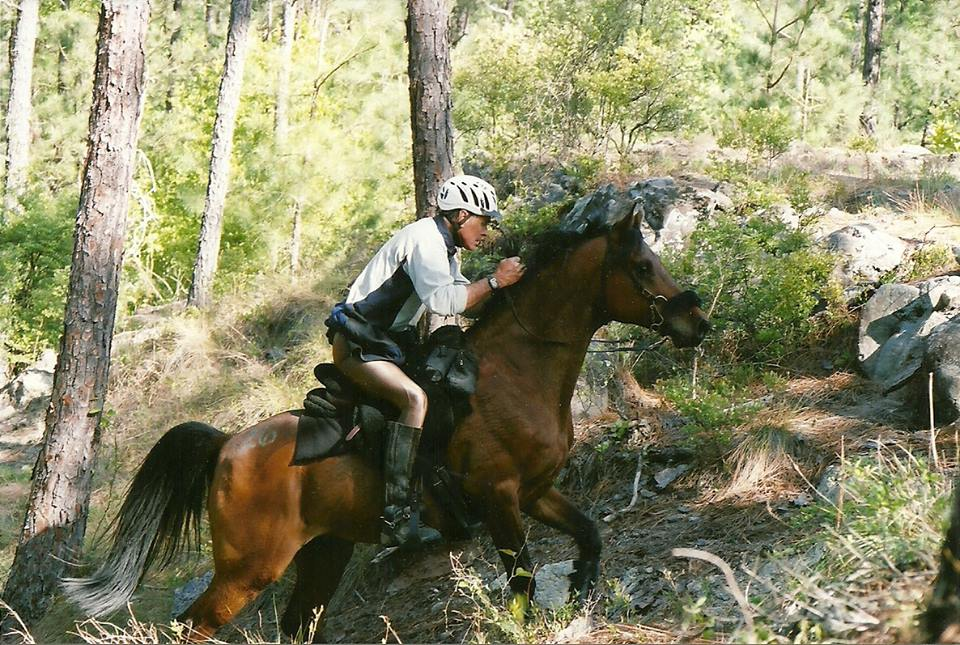
Emerson doing an endurance ride on Rett Butler.

In 2004 Emerson earned a Tevis Cup buckle for completing the 50th Anniversary of the Western States Trail Ride, a 100-mile endurance race. Emerson has also shown Morgan horses, and competed in dressage and jumper shows.

In 2011 Emerson completed his 50th consecutive season as an entry in the Preliminary or Federation Equestre Internationale (FEI) CCI* level. That same year, however, Emerson broke his C1 vertebrae after falling during the cross country phase of an event at the Stoneleigh-Burnham School Horse Trials in late July. Emerson made a full recovery and, as of 2015, continues to regularly school horses and compete in both jumper and dressage shows.

Emerson served as USEA president from 1982-1984 and again from 1991-1992. He also served as the United States Equestrian Team's Vice President of Eventing for seven years, and was a member of the United States Eventing Association's Executive Committee, and the Chairman of the Breeder's Committee of the American Horse Show Association (AHSA).

As of 2015, Emerson operates as a trainer and clinician. Former pupils include Kelli McMullen Temple, a member of Canada's equestrian team at the 1996 Summer Olympics; Dorothy Trapp, the 1994 Individual World Championship silver medalist; David O'Brien, the 1996 winner of Bromont; and Nancy Bliss, a team bronze medalist at the 1982 World Championships.

In 2004 Emerson hosted his first week long "Adult Camp" at his farm in Strafford, Vermont. The Adult Camp program expanded since its start, with programs being run throughout the year at both farm locations.

== Personal life ==
Emerson and his wife, May, live on and run Tamarack Hill Farms in Strafford, Vermont and Southern Pines, North Carolina. They have owned the Vermont property since 1969. They have two sons, Rett and Jamie, and one granddaughter, Abigail.

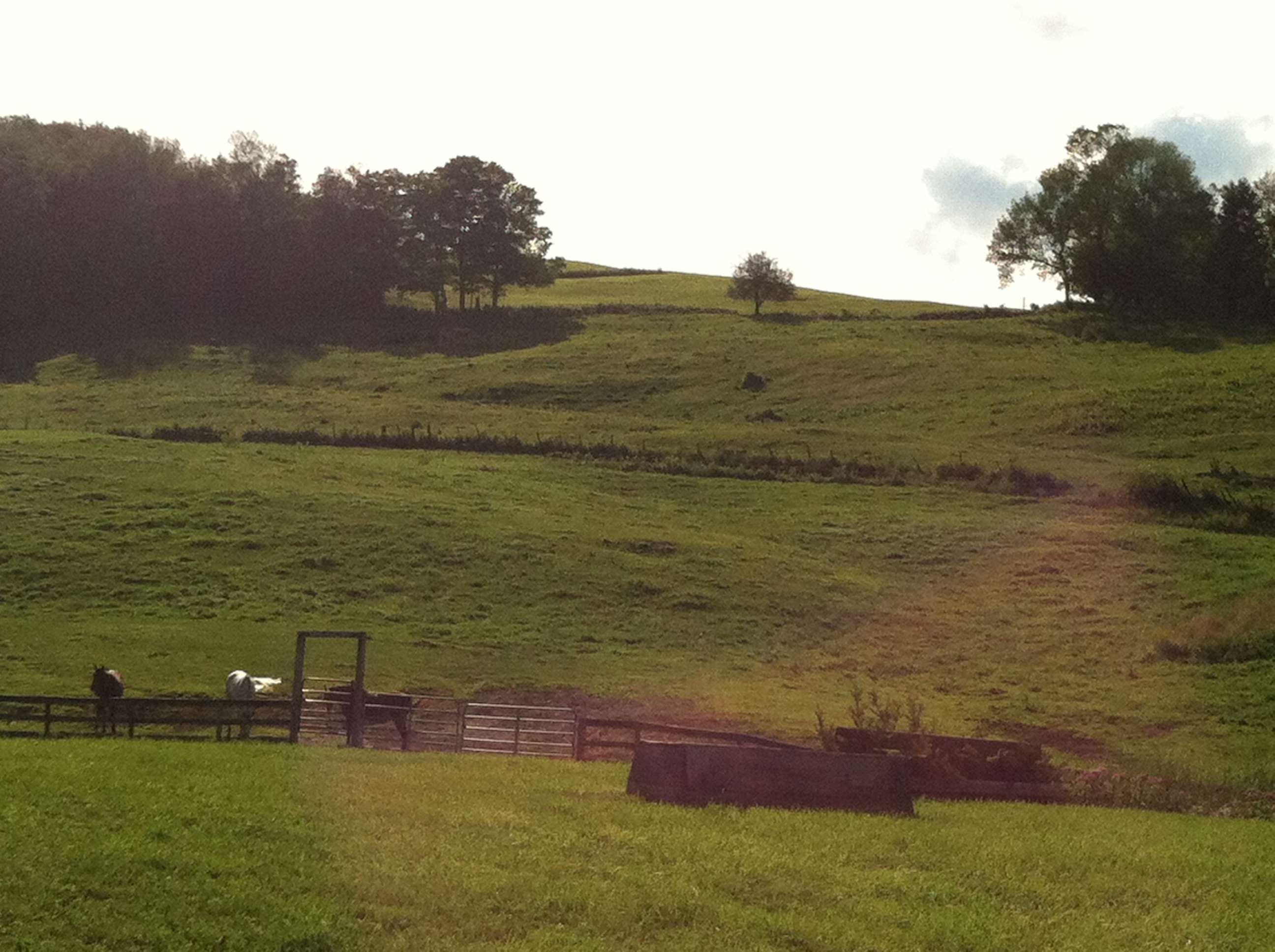
Emerson's Vermont Farm

Emerson graduated from Dartmouth College in 1963 with a degree in English. He later taught high school English in New Jersey and Vermont.

Emerson is a descendant of Revolutionary War General, Israel Putnam.

== Honors and awards ==
- 1972 USEA's Rider of the Year
- 1984 "Wearers of the Green", Dartmouth College Athletic Hall of Fame, inductee
- USEA Wofford Cup for lifetime service to eventing
- 1991 American Riding Instructor Certification Program (ARICP) Lifetime Achievement Award
- 1998 Ayers-Hammett Award by the Equestrian Medical Safety Association
- 1999 Equestrian Land Conservation Resource Anson Taylor Leadership Award
- Named "One of the 50 most influential horsemen of the Twentieth Century" by The Chronicle of the Horse in 2000
- 2006 USEA Hall of Fame Inductee

2022—Named as one of the 100 greatest Dartmouth College athletes of all time.

== Writing ==
Emerson has been a regular contributor to The Chronicle of the Horse's "Between Round's" column since its inception in 1989. In conjunction with feature articles he authored, Emerson appeared on the cover of Practical Horseman magazine in 1982, 1991 and 1999. Emerson also wrote the forewords to Sally Swift's Centered riding; Priscilla Endicott's Taking Up the Reins; Donna Snyder-Smith's The All Around Horse and Rider; and the United States Combined Training Association's (USCTA) Book of Eventing. He has written chapters and sections to several books, including Riding For America; Burghley – The Three Day Event; Lexington, 1978; and Kentucky, Three Day Event.

In 2011 Emerson published his first book, How Good Riders Get Good, through Trafalgar Square Farm Books. The book centers on stories of 23 of the world's top riders from different equestrian disciplines and sports – including dressage, reining, driving, show jumping, endurance, hunter/jumper, and eventing – and how those included overcame significant challenges and setbacks to reach the top.

== Breeding ==
Since the early 1970s the Emersons have kept stallions for stud. Their first was Core Buff, purchased in 1970. Some of their former and current stallions include Forfeit, Right of Light, O'Hara, Epic Win, Wintry Oak, Loyal Pal, Goliad, Not Surprised, Prussian Blue, Silver Comet, Reputed Testamony, Aberjack and Formula One.

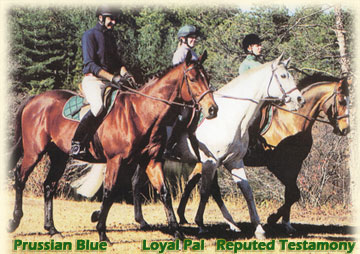
Tamarack Hill Farm Stallions: Prussian Blue, Loyal Pal and Reputed Testamony
