= Joseph Emerson =

American minister and theologian

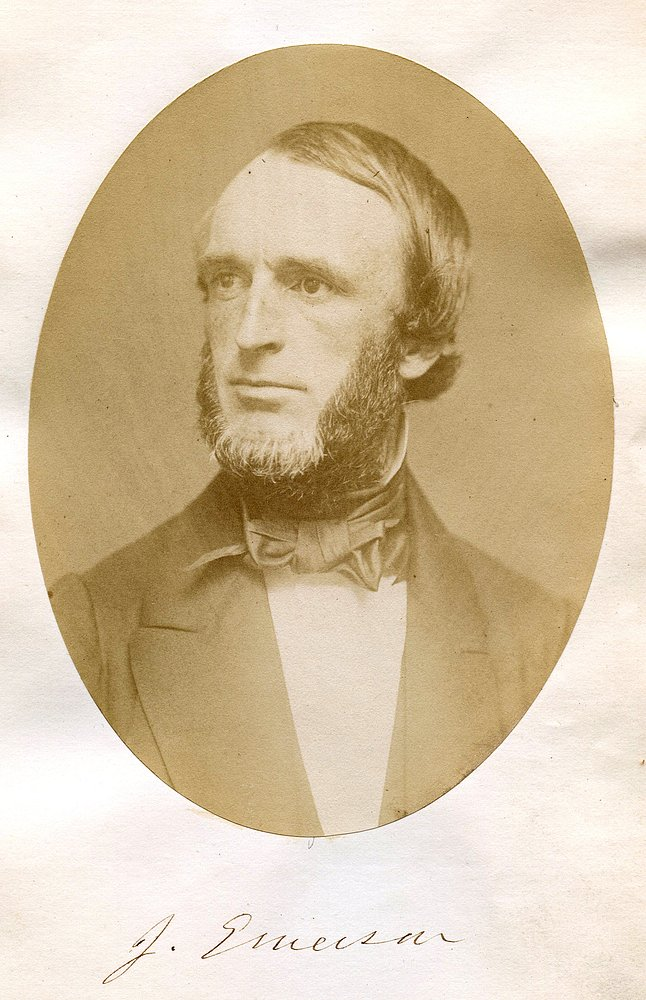
Joseph Emerson

Joseph Emerson (May 28, 1821 – August 4, 1900) was an American minister and theologian.

Emerson, son of Professor Ralph Emerson, D.D. and Eliza (Rockwell) Emerson, was born on May 28, 1821, at Norfolk, Connecticut, where his father was at the time pastor of the Congregational church. His sister was Charlotte Emerson Brown, the first president of the General Federation of Women's Clubs.

In 1829 his father became Professor of Ecclesiastical History in Andover Theological Seminary, in Andover, Massachusetts, and he was prepared for college at Phillips Academy in that place. During his senior year at Yale College he was one of the editors of the Yale Literary Magazine. He graduated from Yale in 1841.

After graduation he was principal of the Union Academy in New London, Connecticut, a year, spent two years in Andover Theological Seminary, and was then tutor in Yale College from September 1844 to April 1848. He was licensed to preach while tutor, and was ordained a Congregational minister on February 22, 1860. Receiving the appointment of Professor of Ancient Languages in Beloit College, Wisconsin, he entered upon his duties in May 1848, after an eventful journey thither, which ended with a two days' ride in an open buggy across the prairie from Milwaukee. Five students formed the first freshman class, and the material equipment consisted of an incomplete brick building. Professor Emerson's department was divided in 1855, and his chair was thereafter that of Greek. He was also librarian for many years. By his students he was known as Zeus, so powerful was his influence upon their characters as well as upon their scholarship. On the fortieth anniversary of his connection with Beloit College, in May 1888, Professor Emerson was remembered with many letters and other testimonials from Beloit graduates and other friends. One gift bore an inscription from Xenophon's Memorabilia of Socrates, "Having caused many to set their hearts upon attaining a noble manliness of life." By quietly interesting friends in the college he secured altogether an addition of $150,000 to its funds, and to him and his classmate, Professor Jackson J. Bushnell, who assumed his duties at Beloit only a few weeks earlier, much of the high repute and usefulness of the college is undoubtedly due.

In June 1870, Professor Emerson went abroad, and spent over a year in travel and study in Europe, Palestine and Egypt. In November 1888, on account of his health, he made another trip to Europe, remaining abroad a year and a half. After his return he did not resume his active duties, but resided part of the time in Beloit, and part of the time in Evanston, Illinois. He was greatly interested in the development of the Art Department of Beloit College, which was started in 1892 by the gift of Mrs. Emerson's collection.

He was the author of many addresses, sermons, lectures and magazine articles, several of which have been printed in pamphlet form. He issued in 1897 a volume of Lectures and Sermons. He also revised and published the History of Philosophy, left by his deceased brother-in-law, Prof Joseph Haven, D.D. He was a member of the Connecticut and Wisconsin Academies of Arts and Sciences, and of the American Philological Association. He received the degree of D D. from Yale in 1880, and of LL.D. from Beloit in 1897.

He married at New Britain, Connecticut, on September 1, 1852, Mary Cordelia, daughter of Alvin North, Esq, and sister of the wife of his classmate, Samuel Brace, and of Hubert F. North. She died in 1879, after many years of ill health. On July 9, 1884, he married Helen Frances, daughter of Harvey and Hannah Thirstin (Thompson) Brace, of Evanston, Illinois, and formerly a teacher in Wellesley College.

Emerson died of general debility at his home in Beloit, on August 4, 1900, at the age of 79 years. His widow, and a son and daughter by his first wife survived him. The son was a trustee of Beloit College and the daughter graduated from Wellesley College in 1891.
