= Percy James Brebner =

English author (1864–1922)

- Born: Percy James Brebner; March 24, 1864; Islington
- Died: July 31, 1922 (aged 58); London
- Writing career
- Language: English
- Genre: Fiction
- Subjects: Adventure fiction, detective fiction

Percy James Brebner (March 24, 1864 – July 31, 1922) was an English writer of adventure and detective fiction.

== Early life and career ==
He was the eldest son of James Brebner, manager of the National Provincial Bank of England, Piccadilly. He was educated at King's College School and worked in the Share & Loan Department of the Stock Exchange before he began his writing career. He published his early novels under the name Christian Lys.

== Writing career ==
=== Mystery fiction ===
One of Brebner's most popular creations was Professor Christopher Quarles, a master detective of the Sherlock Holmes variety. Quarles is an elderly professor of philosophy with a keen deductive mind. He is aided by Murray Wigan, a young policeman who narrates the adventures akin to Dr. Watson from the Holmes stories.

=== Adventure fare ===
Brebner also wrote several historical novels. His Lost World title The Fortress of Yadasara also known as The Knight of the Silver Star was described as "a highly romantic lost-race adventure in the mode of the contemporary historical novel.". It was serialized in Italian and Spanish pulp adventure journals in the early 20th century and was listed in 333: A Bibliography of the Science-Fantasy Novel a collection of the best efforts in Science-Fantasy up to and including 1950.

Additionally, he wrote for various British and American newspapers and magazines including the Weekly Tale Teller and The Sunday Star and publications like The Ilfracombe Chronicle War Supplement during the First World War.

== Works ==
- The Crucible Of Circumstance, 1906
- Princess Maritza, 1906
- The Knight Of The Silver Star, 1907 (American edition of The Fortress Of Yadasara, published under the name Percy Brebner)
- Vayenne, 1908
- A Royal Ward, 1909 Novel set during the Regency era
- The Testing of Olive Vaughan, 1909
- A Gentleman of Virginia, 1910 Novel set during the French Revolution and featuring as Lafayette a character
- The Brown Mask, 1910 Novel about Monmouth's Rebellion
- The Light That Lures, 1911
- The White Gauntlet, 1912 Novel about the First Duke of Marlborough and Queen Anne
- The Little Gray Schoe, 1913
- The Turbulent Duchess, 1915
- A Gallant Lady, 1919
- The Ivory Disc, 1920
- The Gate of Temptation, 1920

Christopher Quarles mysteries

- Christopher Quarles: College Professor and Master Detective, 1914
- The Master Detective: Being Some Further Investigations of Christopher Quarles, 1916

=== Written as Christian Lys ===
- Suspicion, 1889
- A London Cobweb, 1892
- The Doctor's Idol, 1894
- The Dunthorpes of Westleigh, 1896
- The Hepsworth Millions, 1898
- The Fortress Of Yadasara, 1899
- The Black Card, 1899
- The Mystery of Ladyplace, 1900
