= Liliuokalani Protestant Church =

Historic Hawaiian United Church of Christ church

Coordinates: 21.590833°N 158.102211°W

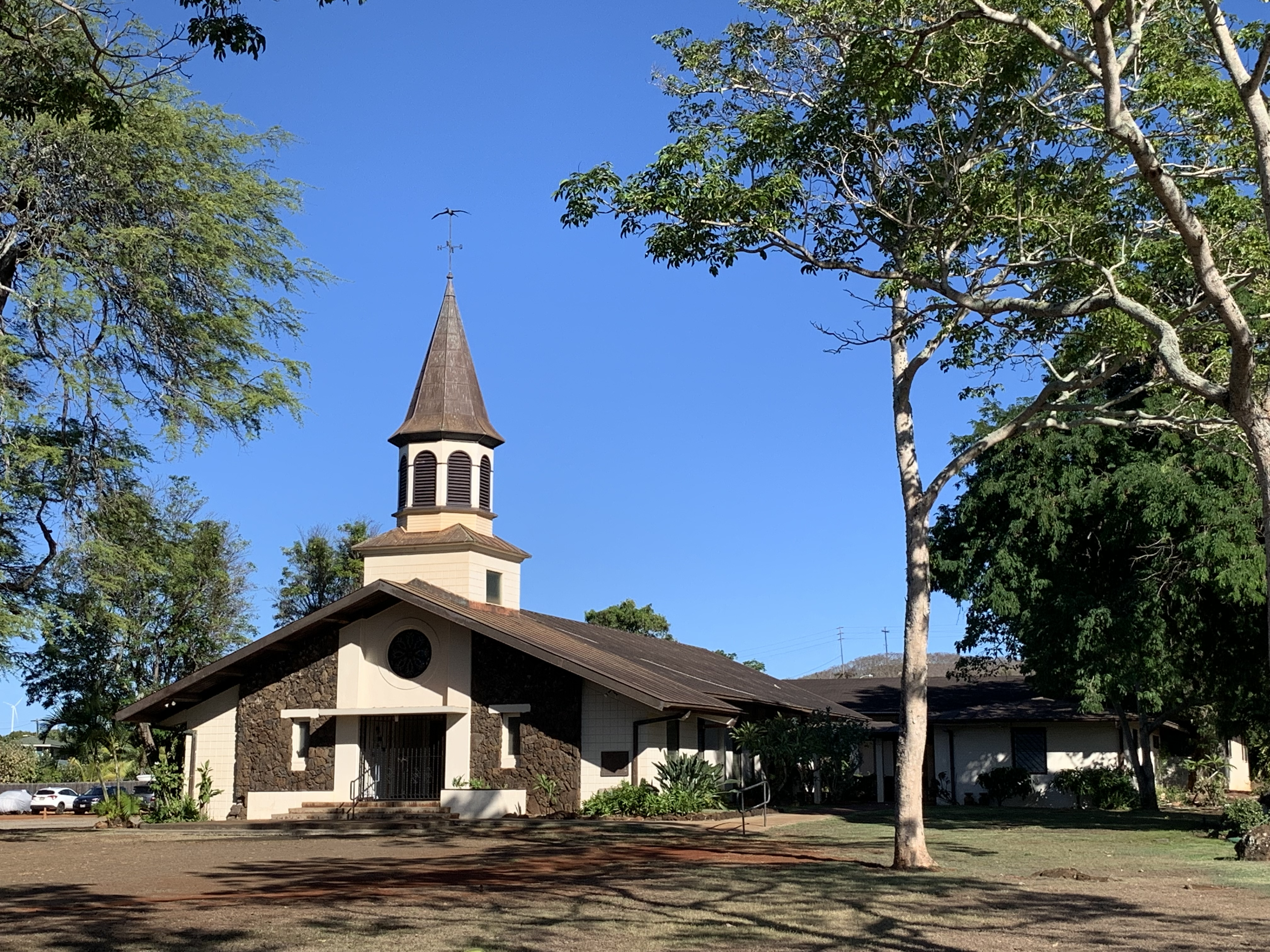
Liliʻuokalani Protestant Church

Liliʻuokalani Protestant Church is a historic United Church of Christ church in Haleiwa, Hawaii on the North Shore of Oahu. The church celebrated its 175th anniversary in 2007.

== History ==
The church was founded by John Smith Emerson and his bride Ursula Sophia Newell Emerson, missionaries, in 1832 in a grass house on the corner of Kamehameha Highway and Haleiwa Road. The second building used was constructed in 1840 of adobe where the church's cemetery is now located. The third and current building was constructed in 1890 of wood and rebuilt with cement in 1961. It is a member of the United Church of Christ. It includes a clock donated by Queen Liliʻuokalani on January 1, 1892. The clock makes one revolution every 16 years and instead of numerals it has the letters L-I-L-I-U-O-K-A-L-A-N-I.
