= Tom Emerson =

Tom or Thomas Emerson may refer to:

- Tom Emerson (Canadian football) (born c. 1935), Canadian football player for the Edmonton Eskimos
- Tom Emerson (architect) (born 1970), British architect
- Thomas Emerson (politician), Australian politician
- Thomas I. Emerson, American attorney and professor of law
- S. Thomas Emerson, also known as Tom, American serial entrepreneur, angel investor and educator
