= Centered riding =

Method of horse riding and riding instruction

Centered Riding is a method of horse riding and riding instruction that is based on the idea of having the rider seated in the most effective position. It combines elements of martial arts, yoga, and tai chi with knowledge of horsemanship to create a system where the rider is centered and balanced in the saddle. Originally developed by Sally Swift, since her death, Centered Riding has been trademarked by a non-profit educational organization that promotes awareness and teaches the principles of Centered Riding internationally. The widespread acceptance of the method marked a significant shift in horsemanship from rote, military-style instruction to a more psychological approach.

The basic components of the centered riding system are "soft eyes", breathing, balance or building blocks, and centering. Soft Eyes is a concept used in many sports in order to relax the athlete and expand their peripheral vision. Swift recommended that riders relax their visual acuity and direct more attention to the tactile interaction between horse and rider.

== History ==
Centered riding was created by Sally Swift (21 April 1913 - 2 April 2009). At age 62, after retiring from a career in agriculture including the American Holstein (cattle) Association, Swift focused full-time on riding instruction and the development of her Centered Riding Techniques. As she developed her techniques and taught people about the Four Basics of Centered Riding, she also published two books that serve as the foundation manuals for the technique, as well as a number of other articles and videotapes.
