= Robert Emerson =

Robert Emerson may refer to:

- Robert L. Emerson (born 1948), American politician
- Rob Emerson (born 1981), American mixed martial artist
- Robert Emerson (scientist) (1903–1959), American botanist
