= Henry Emerson =

Henry Emerson may refer to:

- Henry E. Emerson (1925–2015), U.S. Army general
- Henry I. Emerson (1871–1953), American politician

== See also ==
- Henry Emmerson (1853–1914), New Brunswick lawyer, businessman, politician, and philanthropist
- Henry Read Emmerson (1883–1954), Canadian senator
- Henry Hetherington Emmerson (1831–1895), English painter and illustrator
- Harry Emerson Fosdick (1878–1969), American clergyman
- Harry Emerson Wildes (1890–1982), American sociologist
