= William Otto Emerson =

American painter

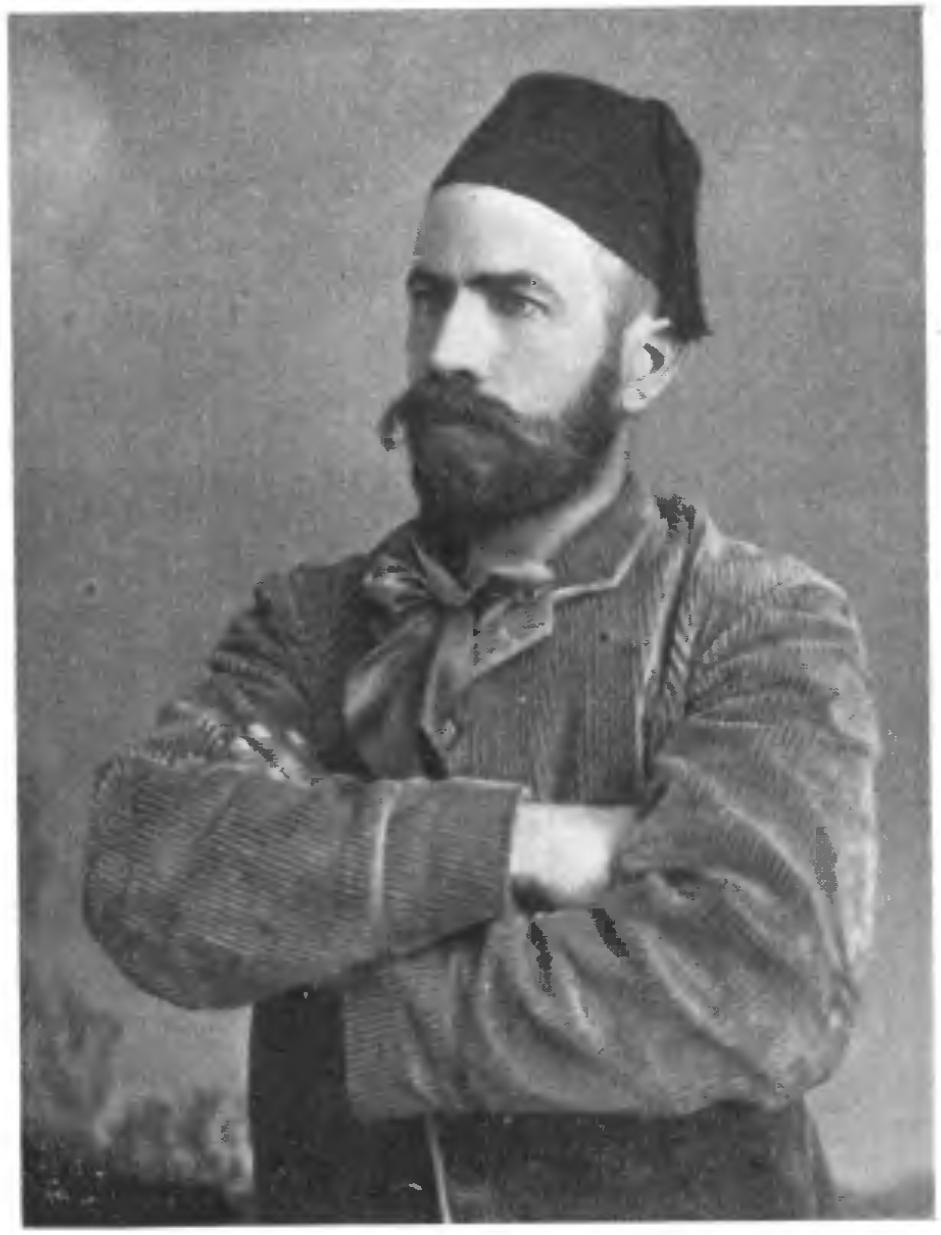
Emerson c. 1899 in artist's attire

William Otto Emerson (March 2, 1856 – December 24, 1940) was an American landscape painter and an ornithologist who was a founding member of the Cooper Ornithological Club.

Emerson was born near Chicago but moved to Placerville, California in 1870 and then went to study art at the School of Design in San Francisco under Virgil Williams. He then went to Paris and studied at Académie Julian studying under William-Adolphe Bouguereau and Jules Joseph Lefebvre. After returning to California he lived in the Bay area and painted numerous landscapes and still lifes. A founding member of the Cooper Ornithological Society for which he served as president twice, he designed the cover of the first issue of Condor. He lived not far from his friend James Graham Cooper after whom the organization was named. He also made visits to the Farallon Islands, took an interest in bird photography, and collected bird specimens, nearly 6000 skins were donated to the California Academy of Sciences. He also grew flowers for the market. He died in Hayward.

A subspecies Coturnicops noveboracensis emersoni was proposed by H. H. Bailey in 1935 but this is considered a synonym of the nominate form.
