= Sharon Emerson =

American biologist

- Born: 1945 (age 80–81)
- Awards: MacArthur Fellowship (1995)

Academic background
- Education: University of California, Berkeley (BA); University of Southern California (MS, PhD)

Academic work
- Discipline: Biology
- Sub-discipline: Zoology
- Institutions: University of Utah, University of Illinois, Chicago, American Society of Zoologists

Sharon B. Emerson (born 1945) is an American biologist and was a research professor emeritus at the University of Utah.

In 1993, she was chair of the Division of Vertebrate Morphology of the American Society of Zoologists. She taught at University of Illinois, Chicago.

== Awards ==
- 1995 MacArthur Fellows Program

== Works ==
- "The ecomorphology of Bornean tree frogs (family Rhacophoridae)", Zoological Journal of the Linnean Society, Volume 101 Issue 4, Pages 337 - 357
- "Allometric Prey of Predator-Prey Interactions", Ecological morphology: integrative organismal biology, Editors Peter Cam Wainwright, Stephen M. Reilly, University of Chicago Press, 1994, ISBN 9780226869957
