= Ursula Newell Emerson =

American missionary

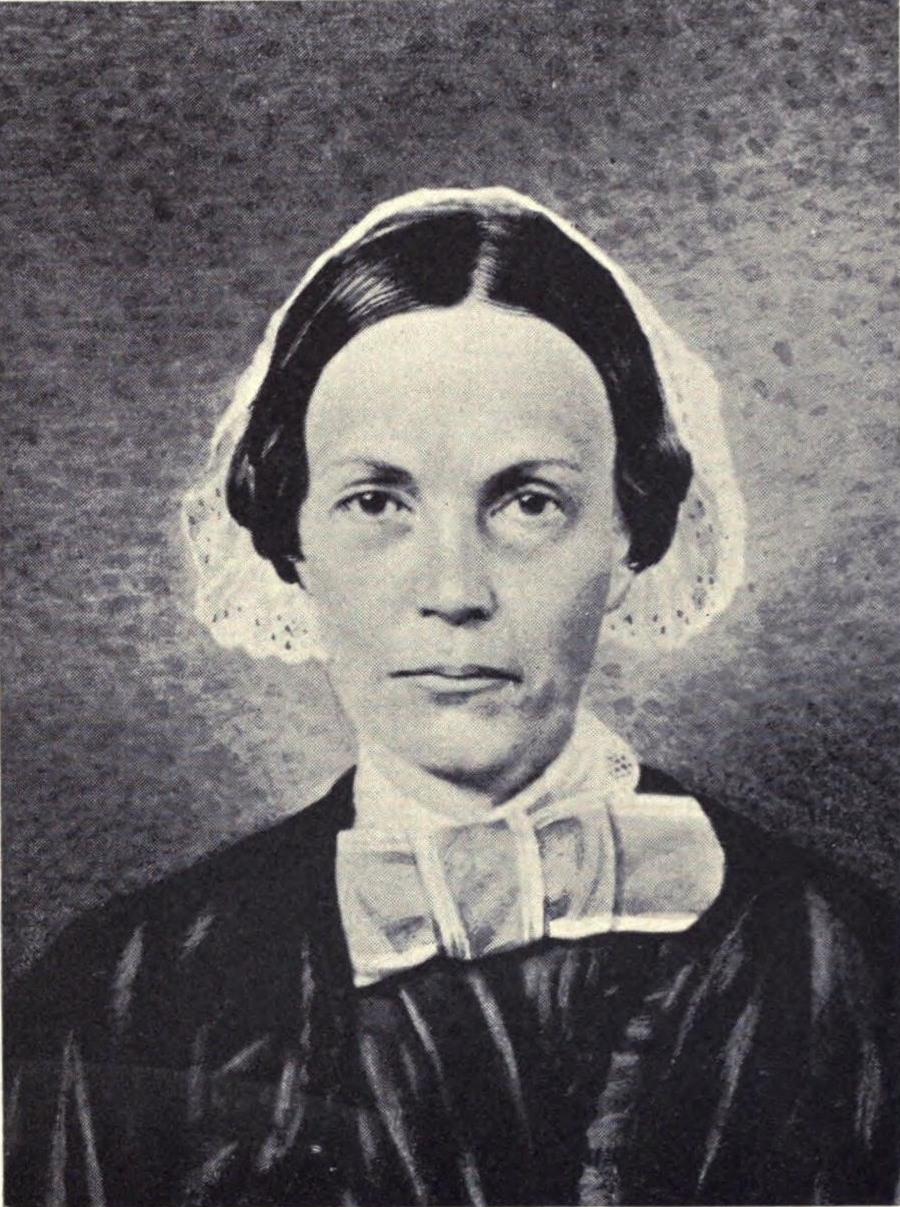
Ursula Newell Emerson, 1854

Ursula Sophia Emerson (née Newell; September 27, 1806 – November 24, 1888) was an American missionary in the Hawaiian Islands who co-founded the Waialua Protestant Church, later renamed the Liliʻuokalani Protestant Church, with her husband John Smith Emerson.

== Early life ==
Ursula Sophia Newell was born in Nelson, New Hampshire, the daughter of Gad Newell, a pastor, and Sophia Clapp Newell.

== Mission work ==
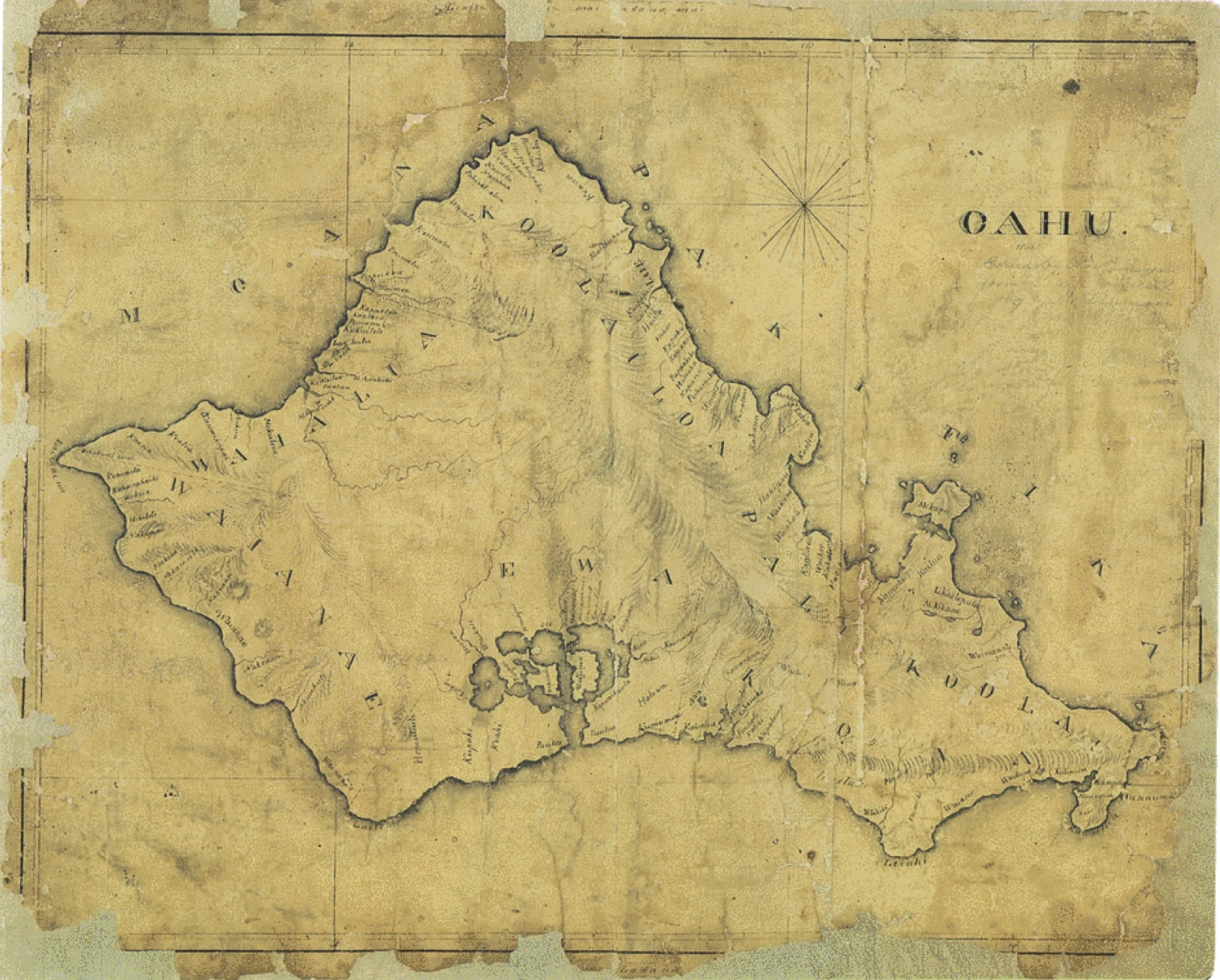
Map of Oahu, Ursula Emerson, 1833

Ursula Newell married John Smith Emerson on October 25, 1831. She and her new husband sailed to Hawaii in 1832, part of the fifth company of missionaries sent by the American Board of Commissioners for Foreign Missions (ABCFM). Most of their work was located on the north shore of Oahu, at Waialua, where they were supported by High Chief Gideon Peleʻioholani Laʻanui. They founded the Liliʻuokalani Protestant Church, on lands donated by Laʻanui, where she led the singing "with energy and precision", and a school for teachers, where she taught.

Ursula Newell Emerson drew some of the earliest surviving manuscript maps of Hawaiʻi, in 1833, for teaching use; they are now in the collection of the Hawaiian Historical Society. Her journals and letters detailing her life on Oahu remain a useful source for historians of the islands.

Writing about her duties as a missionary, she noted:

A missionary here must be not only a pastor and spiritual guide to the people, but also a school-teacher, doctor, farmer and mechanic, this not for a few hundred, but for thousands.

== Personal life ==
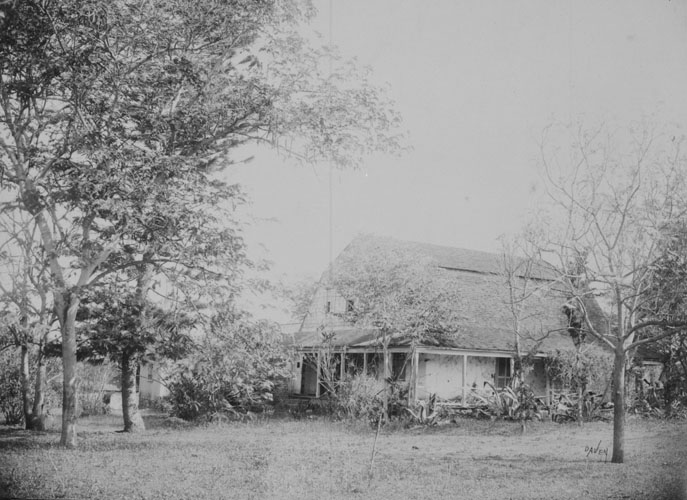
Emerson House, Waialua, Oahu, photograph by Frank Davey, N-0391A, Mission Houses Museum Archives

Ursula Newell and John Emerson raised seven sons and a daughter, all born in Hawaii: Samuel Newell (1832–1910), William Schauffler (1834–1852) John Lowell (1837–1849), Nathaniel Bright (1839–1915), a Harvard-trained physician and writer, Justin Edwards (1841–1923), Joseph Swift (1843–1930), Oliver Pomeroy (1845–1938), and Sophia Elizabeth (1849–1883). One of her grandsons was artist Arthur Webster Emerson.

She was widowed in 1867. She died on November 24, 1888, aged 82 years. Her gravesite is in the Liliʻuokalani Church Cemetery.

In the 1920s, stamps that Ursula Newell Emerson may have sent to a childhood friend in New England became the subject of controversy and lawsuits, as uncancelled missionary postage from Hawaii was a rare find for collectors.
