= Norman Emerson (cricketer) =

Australian cricketer (born 1939)

Personal information
- Born: 26 October 1939 (age 87); Ararat, Victoria, Australia

Domestic team information
- Years: Team
- 1960-1967: Victoria
- Source: Cricinfo, 4 December 2015

Norman Emerson (born 26 October 1939) is an Australian former cricketer. He played four first-class cricket matches for Victoria between 1960 and 1967.

== See also ==
- List of Victoria first-class cricketers
