= Arthur Webster Emerson =

American painter

Blue Shimmering into Green, oil on canvas painting by Arthur Webster Emerson, 1915

Arthur Webster Emerson (December 5, 1885 – July 18, 1968) was a painter who was born in Honolulu, Kingdom of Hawai'i. He was the son of Nathaniel Bright Emerson, and grandson of missionaries John S. Emerson and Ursula Newell Emerson. As a young Hawaiian-born artist, he was encouraged in his painting by Madge Tennent. During the 1910s and 1920s, he painted in New York with other young artists associated with the Ashcan School. Emerson died in 1968.
