= John McLaren Emmerson =

Australian physicist, barrister, and collector of rare books

John McLaren Emmerson (1938-2014) was an Australian physicist, barrister, and collector of rare books. He published and taught on nuclear and particle physics at the University of Oxford, was an authority on Intellectual Property law, and amassed a book collection reflecting his interest in 17th century British history. His is one of the world's largest collections of rare English printed books relating to the reign of Charles I and the English Civil War.

== Life and career ==
Emmerson attended Glamorgan School, and then Geelong Grammar School, where he was Dux of the School in 1955. He was awarded a scholarship to Trinity College, Melbourne. He graduated with an MSc in Physics, before pursuing a DPhil at the University of Oxford on a Shell Company Scholarship. He received his DPhil in 1964, and became a Junior Fellow at New College, Oxford the following year. There he researched and taught nuclear physics, and later particle physics. He published a study on the latter subject in 1972, Symmetry Principles in Particle Physics.

After ten years studying and working at Oxford, Emmerson returned to Australia to pursue a career in law. He began his legal studies in 1971, in Melbourne, and was admitted to practice in 1976. He came to the Bar, and took silk in 1985. Emmerson focussed his practice on Intellectual Property and became an authority in the field, with an emphasis on patents and copyright, particularly pharmaceutical patents.

== Rare book collection ==
Emmerson's collection of rare books consists of over 5,000 items, rendering it one of the world's largest collections of early English printed books. It includes material from the 15th to 18th centuries, and is particularly rich in works on the reign of Charles I and the English Civil War. Subjects range through politics, religion, philosophy, and literature. Highlights of Emmerson's collection include:

- A 1616 edition of the collected writings of Charles I's father, James I, gifted to the young prince and bound to reflect its status.
- A 1485 Bible printed in Nuremberg, owned by William Juxon, the Archbishop of London from 1660.
- Early editions of literary works such as John Milton's Paradise Lost, Jonathan Swift's Gulliver's Travels, and Laurence Sterne's The Life and Opinions of Tristram Shandy, Gentleman.
- A travelling library consisting of sixty miniature books, containing works of history, drama and poetry, gifted to eight-year-old Charles I.

Emmerson began his collection in 1968 in an antiquarian bookshop in Oxford, and he continued to purchase rare books over 46 years.

Following Emmerson's death in 2014, his family donated the collection to the State Library Victoria in 2015. It is the largest collection of Civil War and Restoration material outside the Bodleian Library and the British Library, and has been valued at $5 million. His bequest to the State Library Victoria included a $1.3 million endowment to preserve and catalogue the collection. Emmerson gifted Charles I's travelling library to the Bodleian.
