= George Emerson =

George Emerson may refer to:

- George Barrell Emerson (1797–1881), American educator and pioneer of women's education
- George Henry Emerson (Twillingate and Fogo) (1798–1889), lawyer and political figure in Newfoundland; represented Twillingate and Fogo in the House of Assembly
- George Henry Emerson (speaker) (1853–1916), lawyer, judge and political figure in Newfoundland; represented Placentia and St. Mary's in the House of Assembly
