= Nathaniel Bright Emerson =

American doctor and ethnologist (1839–1915)

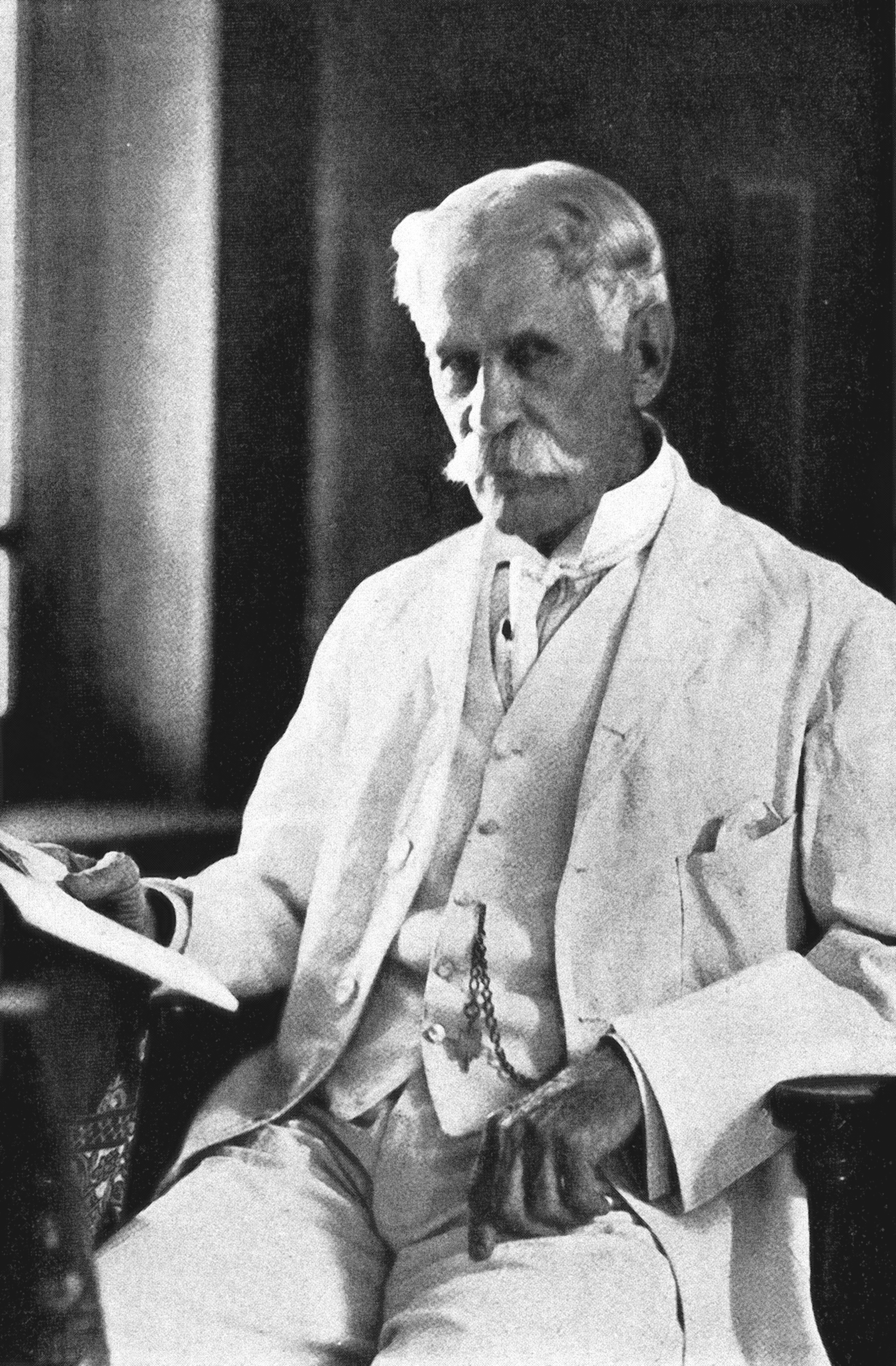
Emerson, c. 1915

Nathaniel Bright Emerson (July 1, 1839 Waialua, Oahu – July 16, 1915, at sea) was a Hawaiian-born American medical physician and author of Hawaiian mythology. He was the son of Protestant missionaries John S. Emerson and Ursula Newell Emerson, and father of artist Arthur Webster Emerson.

He attended Williams College in Williamstown, Massachusetts. He joined the 1st Regiment Massachusetts Volunteer Infantry of the Union Army as a private on September 22, 1862 in Boston during the Civil War. He was wounded three times. After graduating from Williams in 1865, he studied at Harvard and the Columbia University College of Physicians and Surgeons in New York City, from which he graduated in 1869. This was followed by work at Bellevue Hospital in New York City. In New York, Emerson was associated with Willard Parker, a surgeon, as student and assistant. For several years he was also clinical assistant to Dr. Seguin, professor of nervous diseases at the College of Physicians and Surgeons. He served as a doctor in New York until 1878, after which he relocated to Hawaii.

Emerson was an historian and writer of Hawaiian mythology. One of his efforts was the translation into English of David Malo's work on Hawaiian lore and customs. In 1909, the Bureau of American Ethnology published his book, Unwritten Literature of Hawaii, and his last work, Pele and Hiiaka, was published in 1915.

Emerson has been criticized by Hawaiian royalists and historians for being a founding member of the Hawaiian League of 1887, which authored the Bayonet Constitution forced on King Kalākaua, under threat of death. An original copy of the 1887 constitution in the Hawaii State Archives, once owned by William Owen Smith, contains a side note written by Smith listing Emerson as one of the main contributors to the constitution alongside Smith, Sanford B. Dole and Lorrin A. Thurston. He was also criticized for testifying in Washington, D.C. in support of the annexation of Hawaii.

== See also ==
- Hale Nauā Society
