= John Emerson =

John Emerson may refer to:

- John Wesley Emerson (1832–1899), U.S. lawyer, Civil War military commander, judge, and the founder of the Emerson Electric Company
- John Emerson (politician) (1859–1932), Canadian mayor
- John Emerson (filmmaker) (1874–1956), American stage actor, playwright, producer, and director of silent films
- John B. Emerson (born 1954), president of Capital Group Private Client Services, former Deputy Assistant to President Clinton, US ambassador to Germany
- John Haven Emerson (1906–1997), American inventor of biomedical devices
- John Emerson (died 1843), physician and slaveowner of Dred Scott

== See also ==
- John Emmerson (disambiguation)
- "The Brain of John Emerson", a 1955 episode of Science Fiction Theatre
