= Gilbert Henry Collins =

British author

- Born: Gilbert Henry Collins; 1890; Southampton
- Died: 1960 (aged 69–70); Paddington
- Writing career
- Language: English
- Genre: Fiction
- Subjects: Adventure fiction, detective fiction

Gilbert Henry Collins (1890 – 1960) was a British author of adventure and detective fiction. He was born in Southampton to Henry Collins, a merchant, and his wife Harriett. He was educated at King Edward VI School and served as a Gunner in the Royal Garrison Artillery during the First World War.

== Career ==
From 1919 through 1922 he served as a member of the British Consular Service in China. He travelled extensively in Japan and China and his first novels were set in the region. His first novel was Flower of Asia: A novel of Nihon, a thriller set in Japan. His next two novels The Valley of Eyes Unseen and The Starkenden Quest are considered classics of the Lost World (genre) and are listed in 333: A Bibliography of the Science-Fantasy Novel a collection of the best efforts in Science-Fantasy up to and including 1950.

Abridged versions were subsequently published in the American magazine Famous Fantastic Mysteries in 1952 and 1949 respectively. Far Eastern Jaunts and Extreme Oriental Mixture are memoirs based on his experiences in Asia. In the late 1920s he also wrote for Punch (magazine).

Collins began writing detective novels in 1930. He was also an expert swimmer and an honorary swimming coach at a Bournemouth Swimming Club. He wrote two books on swimming: The New Magic of Swimming and The Newest Swimming.

In 1937 Collins was named in a lawsuit along with his publisher Ward Lock & Co for using a manuscript written by writer Harold Scarborough for the novel Mystery in St. James’s Square. The court subsequently found no one at fault, accepting that Collins and his publisher had acted in good faith believing they had been granted the rights to rewrite and publish Scarborough's original novel. But though the matter had been settled, Collins never wrote another novel.

== Works ==
- Flower of Asia: A novel of Nihon, 1922
- The Valley of Eyes Unseen, 1923
- Far Eastern Jaunts, 1924
- The Starkenden Quest, 1925
- Extreme Oriental Mixture, 1925
- Horror Comes to Thripplands, 1930
- Post-Mortem, 1930
- The Phantom Tourer, 1931
- Chinese Red, 1932
- The Channel Million, 1932
- The Dead Walk, 1933
- Death Meets the King’s Messenger, 1934
- The New Magic of Swimming, 1934
- Poison Pool, 1935
- The Haven of Unrest, 1936
- The Newest Swimming, 1937
- Mystery in St. James’s Square, 1937
