= Cherry Logan Emerson (engineer) =

American engineer and academic administrator

Cherry L. Emerson
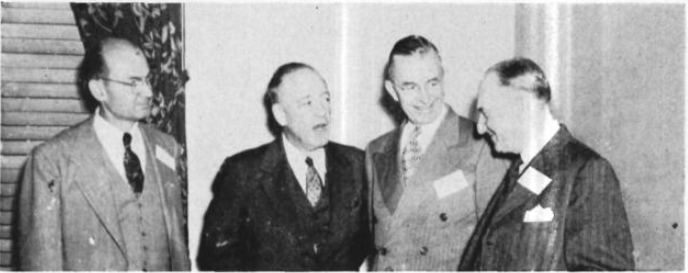
- Emerson (second from left) in 1949
- Born: 1888; Tunnel Hill, Georgia, U.S.
- Died: 1959 (aged 70–71)
- Education: Georgia Institute of Technology

Cherry Logan Emerson, Sr. (1888–1959) was an American engineer and academic administrator.

== Education ==
Emerson graduated from Georgia Tech with two bachelor's degrees: one in mechanical engineering (1908) and one in electrical engineering (1909). He was also a charter member of Georgia Tech's ANAK Society, Editor-in-Chief of the Blueprint, and a brother of the Alpha Tau Omega fraternity.

== Career ==
After many years in the electrical power industry, Emerson returned to Georgia Tech as the dean of the School of Engineering in 1945. He was soon appointed vice president in charge of expansion; under his leadership, the Georgia Tech physical plant doubled in size between 1948 and 1955. Emerson left Georgia Tech in 1955 and died in 1959.

Emerson's son, Cherry Logan Emerson, Jr. was a successful chemist, businessman, and philanthropist. Emerson's father was William Henry Emerson, the first dean of Georgia Tech.
