= William A. Emerson =

American businessman (1921–2017)

William Allen Emerson (July 13, 1921 – May 10, 2017) was an American businessman who was senior vice president and national sales director of Merrill Lynch. He was also a United States Marine Corps veteran, having served in World War II. Alumnus of the University of Florida, a professorship was named after him in the university's business school. He died in May 2017 at the age of 95.

== Early life ==
Emerson was born in Columbia, Tennessee on July 13, 1921 to Henry Houston Emerson and Mabel Allen Emerson. He moved with his family to St. Petersburg, Florida when he was four years old. Emerson attended Lakewood Elementary School, Mirror Lake Junior High School, and St. Petersburg High School. He enlisted in the Marine Corps the day after the bombing of Pearl Harbor in December 1941. Emerson trained as a pilot and faced combat at the Battle of Okinawa. After four years in the military, Emerson attended the University of Florida in Gainesville, Florida to finish his college degree that he started at St. Petersburg Junior College. He was a member of the Phi Delta Theta fraternity. He lived in the FlaVet dormitory and graduated from the university' business college in 1946.

== Career ==
Upon graduating from college, Emerson joined the local Merrill Lynch, Pierce, Fenner, and Beane office in St. Petersburg. He specialized in commodities and was eventually promoted to the title of regional vice president for the southeast. Emerson went on to become a senior vice president and national sales director before retiring from Merrill Lynch after 40 years with the company.

== Philanthropy ==
Emerson and his wife, Jane, were major benefactors to the University of Florida. The Warrington College of Business Administration named a professorship after him. In 2000, he and his wife donated $3 million for the construction of a new alumni and academic building on campus. Emerson Alumni Hall opened in 2002. Emerson was also a past president of the UF Foundation board of directors, and was a trustee emeritus of Oglethorpe University.
