= Cherry Logan Emerson (chemist) =

American chemical engineer

Cherry Logan Emerson, Jr.
- Born: September 30, 1916; Charlotte, North Carolina, U.S.
- Died: April 29, 2007 (aged 90); Atlanta, Georgia, U.S.
- Education: Emory University; Massachusetts Institute of Technology
- Occupation: Chemical Engineer
- Employer(s): Emerson & Cuming Company
- Spouse: Mary L. Emerson
- Parent(s): Cherry Logan Emerson, Sr. Sina White Emerson

Cherry Logan Emerson, Jr. (September 30, 1916 – April 29, 2007) was an American chemical engineer, businessman, and philanthropist.

== Life ==
Cherry Logan Emerson, Jr. was born in 1916 and grew up in Atlanta, Georgia. He was the son of Cherry Logan Emerson, Sr., the dean of engineering at the Georgia Tech, and the grandson of William Henry Emerson, Georgia Tech's first dean. As a child, Emerson had a talent for mathematics, foreshadowing a career in science and engineering.

Despite his father and grandfather's affiliations with Georgia Tech, Emerson chose instead to attend Emory University in Atlanta, earning both a B.A. (1938) and M.A. (1939) in chemistry. He went on to earn an M.S. in chemical engineering at MIT under the tutelage of Warren K. Lewis. During this time, Emerson courted Lewis' daughter, Mary, and the two were married in 1942.

After graduating from MIT, Emerson founded the Emerson & Cuming Company in 1948 with his partner, William Cuming. The two men grew the small Boston-based lab into a worldwide corporation before selling it in 1978. After doing so, Emerson returned to his hometown of Atlanta and began using his profits from the sale of Emerson & Cuming to engage in local philanthropy. He died in 2007.

== Legacy ==
Emerson is honored in a number of capacities at his alma mater of Emory University. The Cherry L. Emerson Center for Scientific Computation, founded in 1991, bears his name, as does Cherry Logan Emerson Hall, a campus building that houses research programs in chemistry. Additionally, the Cherry Logan Emerson Concert Hall was named after Emerson in honor of his $1 million donation in 2002.

Emerson's donations funded two endowed professorships at Emory University: the Mary L. Emerson Chair of Piano Studies, named after his wife, and the William Henry Emerson Chair of Chemistry, named after his grandfather.
