= Edward Emerson (priest) =

Edward Robert Emerson (1838–1926) was Archdeacon of Cork from 1890 until 1926.

Emerson was educated at Bandon Grammar School and Trinity College, Dublin and ordained in 1861. After a curacy at Fanlobbus, he was rector of St Edmund's, County Cork from 1865 to 1890 and treasurer of Saint Fin Barre's Cathedral from 1899.

He died on 30 November 1926.

Religious titles
Preceded by Mervyn Archdall	Archdeacon of Cork; 1890–1926	Succeeded by William Edward Flewett
