= J. Paul Emerson =

American radio personality

Jimmy Coleman (June 8, 1942 – April 9, 2001), known professionally as J. Paul Emerson, was an American talk radio personality who held time slots at several big market American radio stations over the course of his career. He is perhaps best remembered for his dismissal from the radio station KSFO in San Francisco, California in 1995, following controversial remarks he made about gays and people with AIDS. He famously appeared as a guest on the Phil Donahue Show. Previous to that he was fired from another Bay city frequency, KFRC, for uttering anti-Asian remarks. He was then hired by KSFO when it replaced its existing talk radio format with a conservative format called Hot Talk in an effort to improve ratings.

== KSFO controversy ==
He worked for KSFO for only six weeks before stirring up controversy, including reprimands from city officials. As SF Weekly reported..... "the man responsible for the most KSFO complaints is, of course, former KSFO morning man and Bay Area radio veteran J. Paul Emerson, who generated an impressive 42 letters during his 30 days at the station. Most of those gripes were part of an organized protest effort. While they were written in different styles on varying letterheads, all 42 cited the same Emersonian excesses and quoted identical passages from his short-lived show, including, "Alioto, get your butt ready. I guarantee you, you want stinking war, you got war you asshole." While at KSFO among his favorite targets was then mayor and current United States Senator from California, Dianne Feinstein. He was criticized by the San Francisco Board of Supervisors, amongst others. Before his firing by KSFO, following his Donahue appearance, he had created more angst by making anti-Asian comments, remarking that he "hated the Japs."

== Prior to San Francisco ==
Prior to his tenure in the San Francisco radio market, Emerson was on the air for a series of high-profile stations throughout the nation, including WRIT in Milwaukee, Wisconsin (1971–1972), KUPD in Phoenix, Arizona(1973), KGMQ in Honolulu, Hawaii (1975–1976) and WQHT, "Hot 97 FM" in New York City (1988).

== Life ==
Jimmy was born to Paul Coleman and Alyne Surritte in Tulsa Oklahoma. His parents relocated to Carlsbad New Mexico in 1943 when his father was assigned a job at the Airforce Base there after World War II broke out. He was a big baby and overweight as a child and throughout his life. His passions in life were always music, writing, painting and performing. He was often bullied and sought comfort in creative pursuits. For most of his life he was very empathetic and accepted people for who they were. At 13 he formed a jazz and popular music band where he played stand-up bass. His bandmates were all adults and they would have to convince venues that served alcohol to let him in to play since he was underage. The band was very successful and played all over the region. He also became a DJ for KAVE radio at 14 and worked there through high school. After graduating from Carlsbad High School in 1960 he was awarded a full scholarship for music studies to what is now North Texas University in Denton Texas. Exposed to live jazz clubs for the first time, he spent his first year going to clubs and often performing with the band. As a result his grades suffered and he returned home.

He then applied for a DJ role in Albuquerque and this began his career in radio. He later became a "newsman" and had a story-telling style that was his own but based on his idol Paul Harvey. In 1970 he returned to Carlsbad and worked at KCCC, launching what some believe was the first talk radio show called "Let's Trade Even". Callers would offer items to trade (a refrigerator for a used car) and in order to share their item they had to provide an opinion on a news topic of the day. The Vietnam war, President Nixon, Watergate and Hiipies were popular topics along with local politics and racial diversity. He was recruited to a station in upstate New York and spent the next 20 plus years at major radio stations across the country. Along the way he published a magazine "Radio Aces" and had interviews with many musicians including the last known interview with Jim Croce. He also wrote and self-published a book on how to become a radio personality, and wrote a spy novel under a pen name.

After San Francisco he returned home to Carlsbad where he opened a retail shop and began to care for his elderly mother. He hosted one last radio show under a pseudonym for a radio station in Arkansas before his death.

In a discussion with his sister, he shared that he and other radio personalities had been discussing for many years the potential for what is now known as "talk radio". They recognized that as personalities they would need to take extreme views on political topics to get listeners engaged and to stimulate ratings to compete with radio stations that focused on music. Despite having been a lifelong liberal, he was recruited to KSFO by the station manager to host a radical right wing show, a move he personally regretted until his death.

Along the way he was married twice and in one long-term relationship with another radio personality. He had one son. (Information provided by his sister.)

== Death ==
Emerson spent the last 4 years of his life caring for his elderly mother who had developed Altzheimers. He died of a heart attack at his home in Carlsbad, New Mexico, on April 9, 2001. He was 58.
