= Charlotte Emerson Brown =

American club-woman and creator of the General Federation of Women's Clubs (1838–1895)

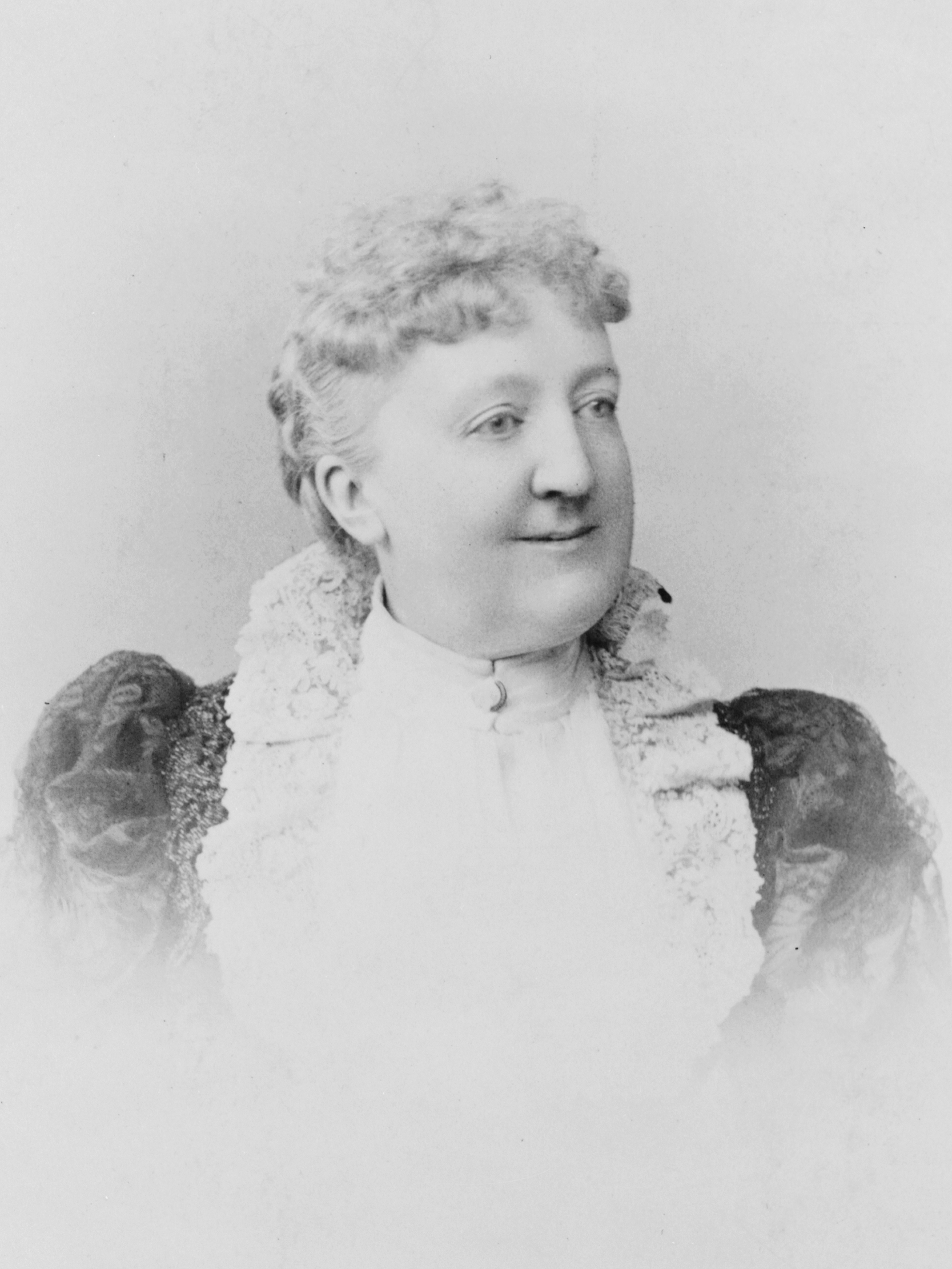
- circa 1870-1890, photo by H.J. Brady
- Born: Charlotte Emerson; April 21, 1838; Andover, Massachusetts, US
- Died: February 5, 1895 (aged 56); Newark, New Jersey, US
- Occupation: Progressive organizer
- Relatives: Antoinette Brown Blackwell, sister-in-law (Note: Note: Blackwell was the first female ordained as a Protestant minister in the United States.)

Signature
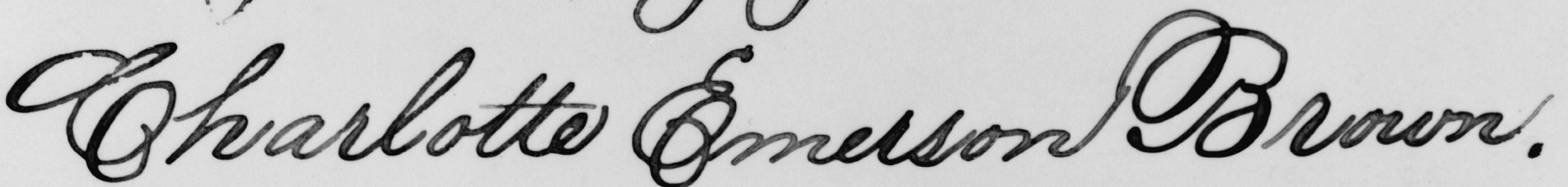

Charlotte Emerson Brown (April 21, 1838 – February 5, 1895) was an American woman notable as the creator and first president of the General Federation of Women's Clubs (GFWC), (Note: Willard & Livermore (1893) refer to the organization as "General Federation of Women's Literary Clubs".) a progressive women's movement in America beginning in the 1890s. During her presidency, membership expanded quickly from 50 cultural clubs to several hundred, and grew to representing tens of thousands of women. She was instrumental in the GFWC's formation of state-level organizations.

== Early life and education ==
Brown was born in Andover, Massachusetts to Reverend Ralph Emerson (Note: Note: not Ralph Waldo Emerson.) and Eliza Rockwell. Brown's father was a professor of ecclesiastical history and pastoral theology at Andover Theological Seminary.

Brown was an avid reader and student who spoke many languages. She graduated from the Abbot Academy of Andover.

== Career ==
Brown taught in Montreal with Hannah Lyman, Vassar's first female president, and studied business in Chicago. Brown's first clubs were a music club and a French club, and her home in Illinois hosted literary, musical and artistic events. She worked part time as a teacher; from 1879-1880, she served as Jane Addams's teacher of the German language.

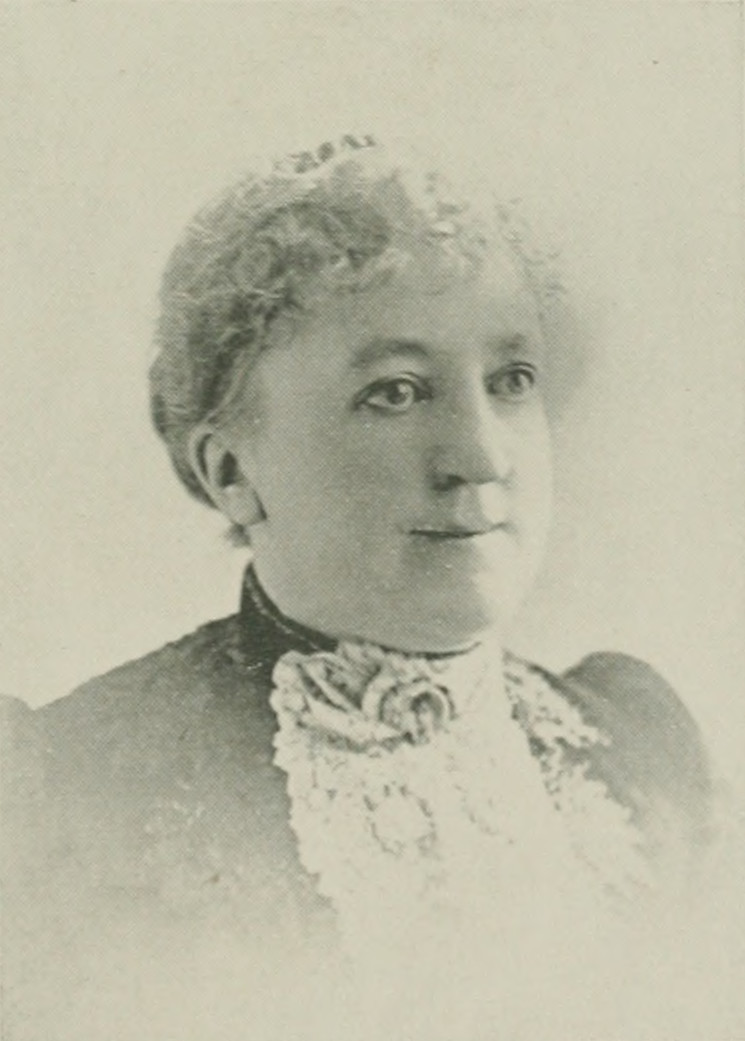
"A Woman of the Century"

She became president of the Woman's Club of Orange. In 1890, she was elected president of the General Federation of Women's Clubs, an organization which encouraged women to educate themselves and become advocates in their communities. Members advocated for clean milk, street lights, and libraries, as well as for regulations regarding child labor and child and maternal health. According to one viewpoint, the exclusion of men in these clubs was helpful in allowing women to develop their own leadership skills. Under Brown's leadership, the organization grew from an initial meeting of delegates from sixty-one clubs to 475,000 U.S. women from 2,865 clubs in the mid-1920s, and was notable for assisting the career development of advocates such as Eleanor Roosevelt. Membership peaked at 830,000 members in 1955. Brown served as the organization's president until 1894.

== Personal life ==
Brown married William Bryant Brown on July 20, 1880, a congregational pastor who served parishes in several states. The couple settled in East Orange, New Jersey. Charlotte Brown died on February 4, 1895.
