= Willis George Emerson =

American writer (1856–1918)

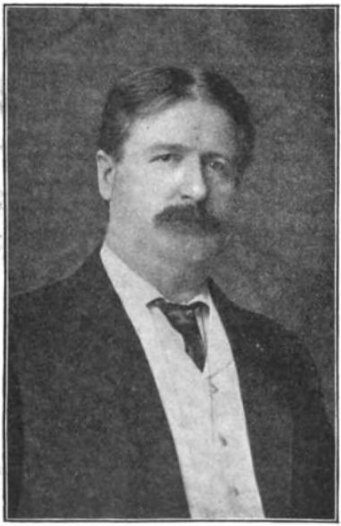
- Born: March 28, 1856; Blakesburg, Iowa
- Died: December 10, 1918 (aged 62); Los Angeles, California
- Occupation(s): Writer, lawyer, politician

Willis George Emerson (1856–1918) was an American novelist (a pioneer of American science fiction), Chicago newspaperman, lawyer, politician, and promoter, who formed the North American Copper Company in Wyoming. He founded the town of Encampment, Wyoming.

== Biography ==
Willis George Emerson was born near Blakesburg, Iowa on March 28, 1856.

He died at his home in Los Angeles on December 10, 1918.

== Works ==
- Winning Winds (1885)
- Grey Rocks: A tale of the Middle West (1894)
- Was It a Crime? "Coin at School" dissected (1900)
- Buell Hampton (1902)
- The Builders (1906)
- The Smoky God or a Voyage to the Inner World (1908)
- The Treasure of Hidden Valley (1915)
- A Vendetta of the Hills (1917)
- The Man who Discovered Himself (1919)
