= William Henry Emerson =

American chemist and academic

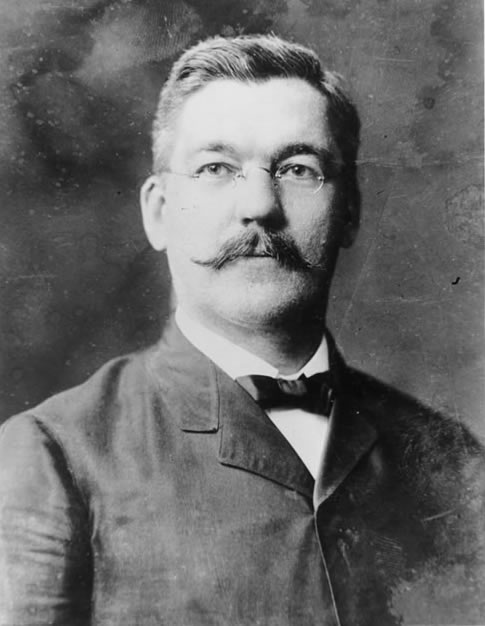
- Born: June 17, 1860; Tunnel Hill, Georgia, U.S.
- Died: November 13, 1924 (aged 64); Atlanta, Georgia, U.S.
- Education: Johns Hopkins University; United States Naval Academy
- Scientific career
- Fields: Chemistry
- Workplaces: Georgia School of Technology; South Carolina Military Academy
- Doctoral advisor: Ira Remsen

William Henry "Big Doc" Emerson (June 17, 1860 – November 13, 1924) was an American chemistry professor and dean at Georgia Tech.

== Life ==
William Henry Emerson was born in Tunnel Hill, Georgia in 1860 to Matilda Caroline Austin, daughter of Clisbe Austin, and Caleb J. Emerson. He joined the United States Naval Academy at age 16, graduating in 1880. Emerson spent the next several years as an officer in the U.S. Navy before enrolling in graduate studies at Johns Hopkins University in October 1883. At Johns Hopkins, Emerson studied chemistry under Ira Remsen. He graduated with his Ph.D. in 1886 and accepted a faculty position at the South Carolina Military Academy (now The Citadel).

In 1888, Emerson left this position to join the faculty at the newly formed Georgia School of Technology (now the Georgia Institute of Technology or Georgia Tech) as an assistant professor. When he joined the faculty at Georgia Tech, Emerson held the only American-earned scientific doctorate among the three other professors. Emerson remained at Georgia Tech for the rest of his life, having been appointed its first dean in 1910. He died in 1924 while still a member of the faculty.

Emerson was a member of the Phi Kappa Phi honor society and the Alpha Tau Omega fraternity. He received an honorary Sc.D. degree from the University of Georgia in 1912. Emerson also helped form the ANAK Society, a secretive honor society at Georgia Tech for senior students.

== Legacy ==
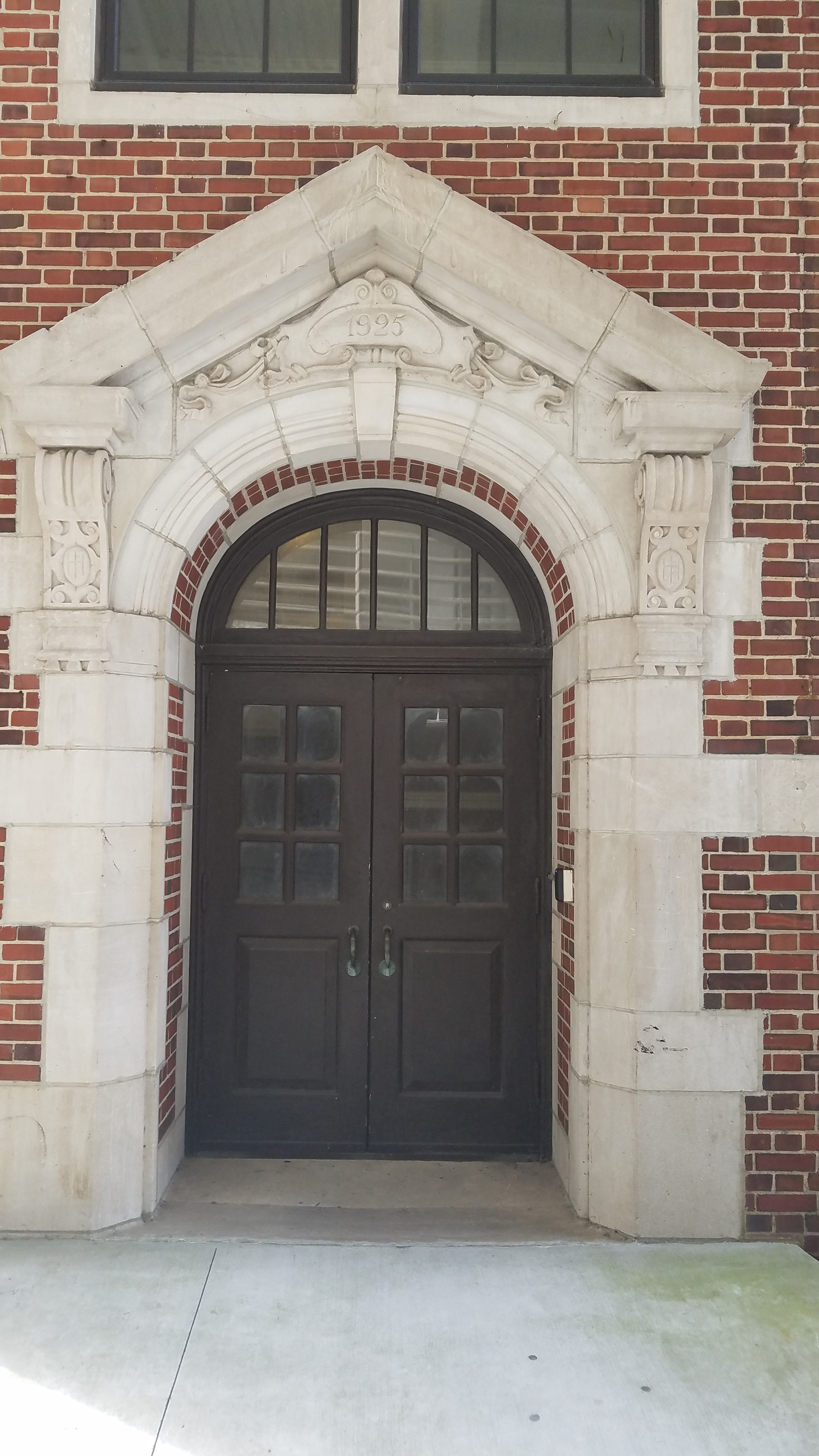
Door to the Emerson Building

William Henry Emerson's son, Cherry Logan Emerson, Sr., also attended Georgia Tech and served as one of its deans. William Henry Emerson's grandson, Cherry Logan Emerson, Jr., did not attend Georgia Tech but nevertheless followed in his grandfather's footsteps and became a notable chemist.

The Class of 1924 and the ANAK Society gifted a portrait of William Henry Emerson to Georgia Tech in 1924, following his death. The portrait was painted by noted Atlanta artist Kate Edwards. After being lost some time in the 1980s, the portrait was found and restored in the early 1990s. It has hung in the atrium of the Lyman Hall Building since October 15, 1992.

The William Henry Emerson Building, erected in 1925 by architects R. S. Pringle and Francis P. Smith, is located in the Georgia Institute of Technology Historic District. The building houses Georgia Tech's Accounting, Capital Planning and Space Management, and Internal Auditing departments.

The William Henry Emerson Fellowship in Chemistry is awarded in his honor. At Emory University, Emerson is recognized by the William Henry Emerson Chair of Chemistry.
