= Ralph Emerson (theologian) =

American educator

Ralph Emerson (Aug. 18, 1787 – May 26, 1863) was Professor of Ecclesiastical History and Pastoral Theology in the Andover Theological Seminary.

He was born on August 18, 1787, in Hollis, New Hampshire, where his father was a leading citizen, and where his grandfather, Rev. Daniel Emerson, was a pastor from 1743 to 1801. He graduated from Yale College in 1811. After studying theology at Andover, he held the office of Tutor in Yale College, from 1814 to 1816, and at the close of this service he was ordained and installed as pastor of the Congregational church in Norfolk, Connecticut. Here he remained till 1829, when he was appointed professor in the Theological Seminary at Andover, an office which he retained through a period of 25 years till April, 1854. The next five years he resided at Newburyport, Massachusetts, after which he removed to Rockford, Illinois, for the sake of being near his children. While there, he repeated by request his lectures on the History of Christian Doctrine, to the students of the Chicago Theological Seminary. He was a contributor to the Bibliotheca Sacra and the Christian Spectator, and to other religious periodicals. He also published a life of his brother, the Reverend Joseph Emerson, and a translation, with notes, of a work on Augustinism and Pelagianism, by C. F. Wiggins.

He received the degree of Doctor of Divinity from Yale College in 1830.

He was married in 1817 to Miss Eliza Rockwell who survived him. Three of his sons, including Joseph Emerson, entered the ministry, and one was a lawyer. One of his daughters was Charlotte Emerson Brown, the first president of the General Federation of Women's Clubs.

He died at Rockford, Illinois, May 26, 1863, aged nearly 76. A sermon was preached at his funeral by his son-in-law, Rev Prof. Haven, and his body was interred at Beloit, Wisconsin.
