= S. Thomas Emerson =

- Born: 1941 (age 84–85); Winnfield, Louisiana, US
- Education: Massachusetts Institute of Technology; Rice University
- Occupations: Distinguished career professor of entrepreneurship, Carnegie Mellon University
- Known for: Periphonics, Syntellect, Xantel
- Website: www.linkedin.com/in/s-thomas-emerson-ph-d-a0a71

S. Thomas Emerson, Ph.D., also known as Tom, is an American serial entrepreneur, angel investor and educator. Emerson co-founded three technology companies, Periphonics Corporation, Syntellect Inc. and Xantel Corporation. Emerson served as CEO of each company.

Emerson is distinguished career professor of entrepreneurship at Carnegie Mellon University's campus in Doha, Qatar since 2005. He served as a director of the Donald H. Jones Center for Entrepreneurship of Carnegie Mellon University from 2000 to 2005. Prior to Carnegie Mellon, Emerson served as the president and CEO at Arizona Technology Incubator from January 1999 to May 2000. From 1992 to 1998, Emerson served as the president, CEO, and the chairman of Xantel Corporation. From 1984 to 1992, he served as the president, CEO, and chairman of Syntellect Inc. From 1969 to 1984, he served as the president and CEO of Periphonics Corporation.

Emerson invests in high-tech startups and serves as director for such startups and not-for-profit organizations.

== Early life and education ==
Emerson was born in Winnfield, Louisiana, to Joe Hall Emerson and Byrd Nelson Emerson. In 1959, he graduated from Winnfield High School. In 1963, he received a Bachelor of Science in physics from Massachusetts Institute of Technology. He also received a Master of Arts in 1966 and a Doctor of Philosophy in nuclear physics in 1968 from Rice University.

== Career ==
=== Early years ===
Emerson joined Brookhaven National Laboratory in Brookhaven, New York, where he designed computerized data acquisition equipment for high energy physics experiments.

=== Periphonics ===
In 1969, he co-founded and served as CTO of Periphonics Corporation, Bohemia, NY, a manufacturer of voice response systems. In 1974, he became chairman and CEO.

In 1974, Emerson was selected "Inventor of the Year" by the United States Patent Office. The owner of three U. S. Patents in computer technology, he also holds several foreign patents and has authored more than 20 scientific and technical publications.

Periphonics later became a subsidiary of Exxon Corporation.

=== Syntellect ===
In 1984, Emerson founded and served as president and CEO of Syntellect, Inc. in Phoenix, Arizona. Syntellect makes computerized telephone systems (Infobot). Syntellect made an IPO in March 1990.

In 1986, the University of Arizona named Emerson “Entrepreneurial Fellow”.

In 1989, Inc. Magazine named Emerson “Arizona’s High Technology Entrepreneur of the Year."

In 1990, Arizona State University named him “Arizona’s Entrepreneur of the Year."

=== Xantel ===
After leaving Syntellect, Inc. in 1992, Emerson founded Xantel Corporation in Phoenix, Arizona, a company that develops hardware and software for desktop telephone management. Emerson served as chairman and CEO of this company until January 1998.

=== Arizona Technology Incubator ===
In 1998, Emerson became chairman of the Arizona Software Association, a member of the Enterprise Network. He was also on the advisory boards of Arizona State University and the University of Arizona.

In January 1999, Emerson was named CEO of Arizona Technology Incubator, a seven-year old Scottsdale-based organization that supports emerging technology companies and has been described as a non-profit "think tank." This position required Emerson to guide the incubator's 18 companies, raise money and work on other companies he founded. During this endeavor he raised $55 million in venture capital funding.

In 2000, Emerson was awarded Technology Leadership Award by Arizona Software and Internet Association for his work with the Arizona Technology Incubator and other Arizona-based not-for-profit and economic development organizations.

=== Carnegie Mellon University ===
In May 2000, Emerson joined the faculty of Carnegie Mellon University in Pittsburgh, Pennsylvania. He served as a director of the Donald H. Jones Center for Entrepreneurship of Carnegie Mellon University from 2000 to 2005. He was also David T. and Lindsay J. Morgenthaler Professor of Entrepreneurship at the Carnegie Mellon Tepper School of Business between 2003 and 2009.

In 2005, Emerson took a faculty position at Carnegie Mellon University’s new campus in Doha, Qatar. Since then, he teaches classes in entrepreneurship at Carnegie Mellon University in Qatar.

Emerson also holds a teaching appointment in the Beijing International MBA program at Peking University, Beijing, China.

== Personal life ==
Emerson is married to Linda Emerson of East Hampton, NY, and they have two sons, Griffin Emerson and David Emerson.
