= The Smoky God =

1908 novel by Willis George Emerson

The Smoky God, or A Voyage Journey to the Inner Earth is a book presented as a true account written by Willis George Emerson in 1908, which describes the adventures of Olaf Jansen, a Norwegian sailor who sailed with his father through an entrance to the Earth's interior at the North Pole.

== Plot introduction ==
For two years Jansen lived with the inhabitants of an underground network of colonies who, Emerson writes, were 12 feet tall and whose world was lit by a "smoky" central sun. Their capital city was said to be the original Garden of Eden. Later works by other authors, such as Agartha - Secrets of the Subterranean Cities, have identified the civilization Jansen encountered with Agartha (a mythical subterranean city), although Emerson did not use the name.
