= Sally Swift =

American horseback riding teacher (1913–2009)

- Born: Sarah Rodman Swift; April 20, 1913; Hingham, Massachusetts, U.S.
- Died: April 2, 2009 (aged 95)

Sally Swift (April 20, 1913 – April 2, 2009) was an American equestrian.

== Life ==
Sarah Rodman Swift was born and raised in Hingham, Massachusetts, just south of Boston. At age seven, scoliosis appeared on her spine. Swift began riding lessons at eight years old. With the help of her sister, she learned to trot and, shortly enough, began proper lessons with her first riding teacher, Phillis Linnington. She was homeschooled until the 7th grade by her mother, Elizabeth Swift, then attended Milton Academy until graduating. Swift spent three years after high school apprenticing with Linnington in England, and later attended Colonel Guirey of the Boots and Saddle Riding School in New York City. Not wanting to be viewed as a “hard-boiled spinster,” she decided to attend the University of Massachusetts from 1943 to 1945, then transferred to Cornell University in 1947 with a B.S. in agriculture. Eventually, she worked at the Holstein Association of America for 21 years before retiring in 1975.

From Sally’s childhood to her early 20s, she studied the connection between the body and mind to help ease her life with scoliosis. Her mother had initially found a woman named Mabel Ellsworth Todd, author of the book The Thinking Body. Todd suggested that the mind could be used to influence the body. As Swift worked with her, they focused on the pelvis and the psoas muscle, which would soon be applied to her riding. Body awareness is another concept their lessons were centered around, as Todd would push Sally to explore the new “awareness” that scoliosis brought her. In addition to body awareness, Todd also recommended more practical exercises, such as having Swift learn to write with her left hand, and easing stress on her back by having Swift's sister carry her textbooks to school. While working with Mabel Todd, Sally Swift began training with Peter Payne in 1980, a teacher who emphasized the Alexander Technique. This technique re-educated her mind and body towards greater balance and integration through movement and posture, enhancing Mabel Todd’s teaching. Sally and Peter worked with areas of the body rather than specific muscles, with a balanced approach catering to both sides of the brain. Her work with Peter enabled her to fully discard the back brace she had worn since she was seven.

Throughout her adult life, Sally Swift stayed active in the horse world. She joined the Brattleboro Riding Club and Dressage Show. Within no time, this show evolved into the largest single-day horse show in the United States, owed her pristine leadership. Her success continued into her retirement years. At 62, Sally retired from the American Holstein Association and began teaching riding to a few friends, putting into practice all the information she had learned from trainers such as Mabel Todd and Peter Payne. Sally Swift founded this establishment because if you turn to your center, the inner lower body, and allow it to become the core of motion, you will find harmony between yourself and your horse while riding. Her reasonable prices at $10 per lesson or $50 per day attracted many riders, and her business grew to be a success. The word spread that Sally was an expert at imagery, acknowledging that many learned through images or sensations rather than words. Unlike other trainers in her time, she could infuse various learning approaches together based on the student’s needs. Her kinder and more personalized approach has shaped how riding instruction is taught today. As a whole, Centered Riding teaches a language that allows clear communication between the horse, rider, and instructor, encompassing all seats and styles of riding.

Swift traveled along the East Coast, teaching. In the 1980s, her travels expanded to Australia and Europe. The demand for Centered Riding clinics and instructors escalated, with members from all around the world. Centered Riding clinics can be seen in France, Japan, and The Netherlands.

== Writing ==
In 1985, Swift published her first book, Centered Riding. The publication is now deemed a classic in the riding industry, with over 800,000 copies sold worldwide and translations in 15 languages. Following the success of her first book, Sally released a sequel, Centered Riding 2: Further Exploration, in 2002, with 100,000 copies sold, translated into nine languages.

== Awards and recognition ==
Swift received the Lifetime Achievement Award from the American Riding Instructor Certification program in 1997 and 2006. At 93, she joined the United States Dressage Foundation’s Hall of Fame, exclusive to those who greatly impacted horse riding. In the next four years, she won the Equine Industry Vision Award by Pfizer Animal Health and American Horse Publications and the United States Equestrian Federation Pegasus Award.

== Death ==
Sally Swift died on April 2, 2009, from pneumonia. Through the days of her illness, she was surrounded by the Centered Riding family and long-time friends, Lucile Bump, Munson Hicks, and Francois Lemaire De Ruffieu. Before Sally’s sickness, as Centered Riding had grown so large, Sally created an apprenticeship program. In this, people would travel with Sally, watching how she taught and the various methods she used to get a successful outcome with riding. Soon enough, these apprentices became Senior Centered Riding Instructors, who now carry on her legacy and teachings.
