= Rowbotham =

Rowbotham is a surname. Etymologically it is roe–bottom, meaning a depression in the ground (Old English bothm) inhabited by deer (roe). The name originates from such a geographic feature near Ashton-under-Lyne, England. Notable people with the surname include:

- Darran Rowbotham (born 1966), Welsh footballer
- David Rowbotham (1924–2010), Australian poet and journalist
- Dave Rowbotham (1958–1991), English rock musician
- Harry Rowbotham (1911–1979), English footballer
- Jason Rowbotham (born 1969), Welsh footballer
- Jeffrey Rowbotham (1920–1984), Scottish architect
- Joseph Rowbotham (1831–1899), English cricketer
- Michael Rowbotham, English political and economic writer and commentator
- Mike Rowbotham (born 1965), South African footballer
- Samuel Rowbotham (1816–1884), English inventor and writer, advocate for a flat earth
- Sara Rowbotham (born 1980), British councillor and activist
- Sheila Rowbotham (born 1943), British socialist feminist theorist
- Thomas Charles Leeson Rowbotham (1823–1875), British painter
- Thomas Leeson Scrase Rowbotham (1782–1853), British painter
- William John Owen Rowbotham, birth name of Bill Owen (1914–1999), British actor
- Clarence Rowbotham (1934–2023), Canadian musician and adventurer
- Lettice Rowbotham (born 1989), British violinist

== Variant forms ==
- Rowbottom

=== Robottom ===
- Dame Marlene Robottom, British educator

=== Robotham ===
- George Robotham (1921–2007), American actor
- Michael Robotham (born 1960), Australian crime author
- Robert Robotham (c. 1522 – c. 1571), English politician
- William Arthur Robotham (Roy) British engineer with Rolls-Royce, designer of the Rolls-Royce Meteor tank engine
