= Kate Greenaway =

British artist (1846–1901)

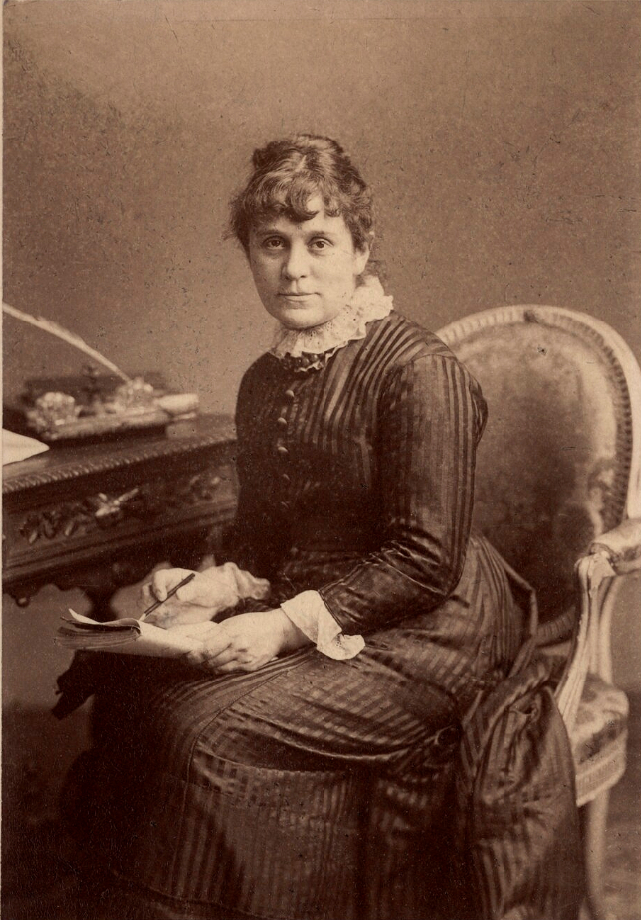
- Born: Catherine Greenaway; 17 March 1846; Hoxton, Middlesex, England
- Died: 6 November 1901 (aged 55); Frognal, London, England
- Education: Heatherley School of Fine Art
- Known for: Creation of picture books

Catherine Greenaway (17 March 1846 – 6 November 1901) was an English Victorian artist and writer, known for her children's book illustrations. She received her education in graphic design and art between 1858 and 1871 from the Finsbury School of Art, the South Kensington School of Art, the Heatherley School of Art, and the Slade School of Fine Art. She began her career designing for the burgeoning greetings card market, producing Christmas and Valentine's cards. In 1879 wood-block engraver and printer Edmund Evans printed Under the Window, an instant best-seller, which established her reputation. Her collaboration with Evans continued throughout the 1880s and 1890s.

The depictions of children in imaginary 18th-century costumes in a Queen Anne style were extremely popular in England and internationally, sparking the Kate Greenaway style. Within a few years of the publication of Under the Window Greenaway's work was imitated in England, Germany, and the United States.

== Childhood ==
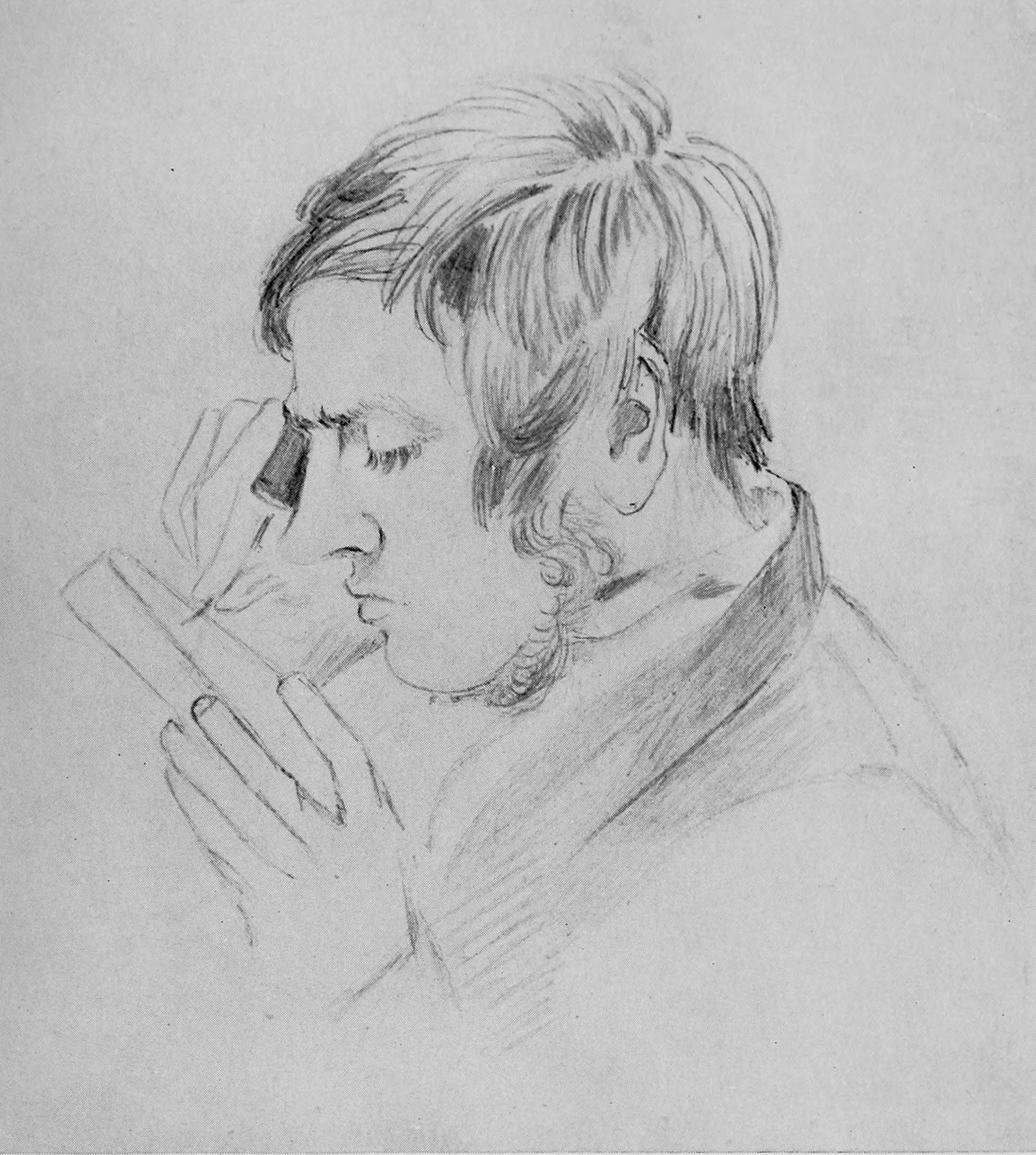
Pencil drawing of John Greenaway at work, by Birket Foster

Kate Greenaway was born in Hoxton, London, the second of four children, to a working-class family. Her mother, Elizabeth, was a dress maker and her father, John, an engraver who gave up steady employment with Ebenezer Landells' engraving firm to strike out on his own. When Greenaway was very young, he accepted a commission to provide the engraved illustrations to a new edition of Charles Dickens's The Pickwick Papers, sending his young family away to relatives in the countryside to give himself solitude while producing the engravings. Kate's earliest memories are of Rolleston, Nottinghamshire, which affected her deeply. It was a place she returned to frequently in her childhood. According to children's literature scholar Humphrey Carpenter, the period was to Greenaway "crucial ... she felt it to be her real home, a country of the mind that she could always reimagine". After returning to grimy London streets Rolleston became a place to visit in her mind and constantly embellish.

The publisher who commissioned John Greenaway's work went bankrupt, leaving the family without an income. When Elizabeth Greenaway returned from Rolleston with the children, the family moved to Islington, where she opened a children's dress shop that attracted well-to-do clients. The family lived in the flat above the shop, and young Kate, often left to her own devices to explore, spent many hours in the enclosed courtyard garden, later writing about it in her unfinished autobiography as a place filled with "richness of colour and depth of shade."

John Greenaway provided for his mother and two sisters as well as for his own family. He took piecemeal engraving jobs, usually for weekly publications, such as The Illustrated London News. He frequently worked on the wood carving throughout the night in front of the fire. Kate enjoyed watching him, and through his work was exposed to illustrations by John Leech, John Gilbert, and Kenny Meadows.

As a young child Greenaway's parents taught her at home; later she was sent to various dame schools; she was an avid reader of chapbook versions of fairy tales – her favourites were "Sleeping Beauty", "Cinderella", and "Beauty and the Beast" – as well as illustrated editions of Shakespeare, writing later that children "often don’t care a bit about the books people think they will and I think they often like grown-up books – at least I did." Her father's engravings exposed her to weekly news stories, some of which were quite grisly, such as the series of his illustrations for The Illustrated London News in 1856 about murderer William Palmer.

== Education and early work ==
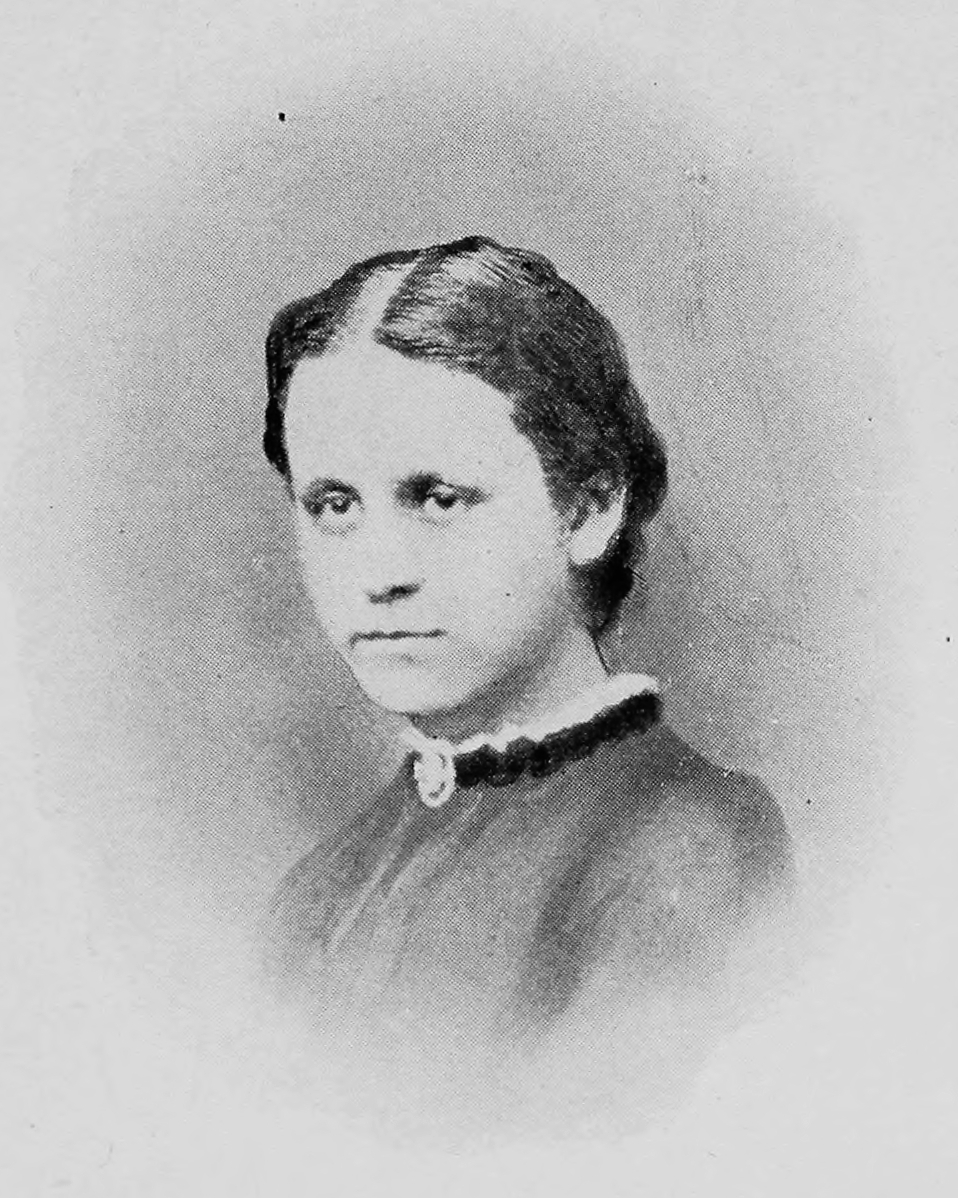
Greenaway at age 16

In 1858, at age 12, she began night classes at nearby Finsbury School, a local branch of South Kensington School of Art participating in National Course of Art Training in the decorative arts. Night courses, open only to women, were offered in drawing, porcelain painting, wood engraving, and lithography. She enrolled full-time a year later. The curriculum, devised by Henry Cole, was meant to train artisans in designing decorative wallpaper, tiles, and carpets. It emphasised strict adherence to copying geometric and botanical elements without creativity. There were four stages of courses, which she completed in 1864 before going to the Royal Female School of Art.

The headmaster at the Royal Female School of Art was Richard Burchett, whom Elizabeth Thompson described as a "bearded, velvet-skull-capped and cold-searching-eyed man." Greenaway was quite shy and thought of herself as plain and unattractive compared to the other students. Yet she became friends with the much more popular Thompson, with whom she shared a studio. The two young women worked diligently in their studio to perfect their skills. At this point she was allowed to draw human figures, at first from plaster casts and then from models dressed in historical or ornamental costumes, skills she applied during the summers in Rolleston. However, she was unable to fully master human anatomy; frustrated that nude models were not permitted in the women's classes, she enrolled in night classes at Heatherley School of Fine Art where she met Edward Burne-Jones, Edward Poynter, and Walter Crane.

Greenaway illustrated "Diamonds and Toads" for Frederick Warne & Co in 1871.

In 1871 she enrolled in the Slade School of Fine Art, where Poynter was head master. Determined to break from Henry Cole's rigid curriculum, he exhorted students to become more expressive and creative, concepts alien to Greenaway whose long early years of training consisted solely of copying and work with geometric designs. She struggled at Heatherley and once again was frustrated that women were segregated from men in the life class.

While she was still in school, Greenaway received commissions for children's book illustrations. The first came in 1867 for a frontispiece for Infant Amusements, setting a path towards specialisation in children's books. Her reputation was built on the awards she had won while completing the National Art Courses, and buttressed with early exhibitions. She exhibited a set of fairy watercolours in 1868, which she sold to W. J. Loftie, publisher of People's Magazine. He set them to verse and printed them in his magazine. A year later Frederick Warne & Co purchased six illustrations for a toy book edition of "Diamonds and Toads", printed by Joseph Martin Kronheim, which took a year to complete. In 1871 Gall & Inglis published an edition of Madame d'Aulnoy's fairy tales, which she illustrated. That year she continued with her classes and earned more than 70 pounds.

She was aware that the work she produced was overly gaudy, in part because she lacked technical knowledge of the Chromoxylography process. To gain a better understanding of the colour process, she made frequent visits to the National Gallery, where she studied masters such as Jan van Eyck, whose Arnolfini Portrait she especially liked. At that time, she gained access to the manuscript room at the British Museum, where she studied illuminated manuscripts.

== Freelance years ==
The new, popular and lucrative card market coincided with the end of Greenaway's formal training. Greetings cards first appeared in the 1840s, and by the 1860s the market had exploded. Card maker Marcus Ward & Co hired Greenaway in 1871 on a freelance basis. With its reputation for high quality work, the Belfast firm was one of the pre-eminent card printers of the Victorian era. Her designs sold well and they said of her work that "her special talent was in the direction of costume figures and dainty colours." Her cards sold well, and early Valentines sold 25,000 copies in weeks.

== Under the Window ==
Her first book, Under the Window (1879), a collection of simple, perfectly idyllic verses about children, was a bestseller.

== Later years and death ==
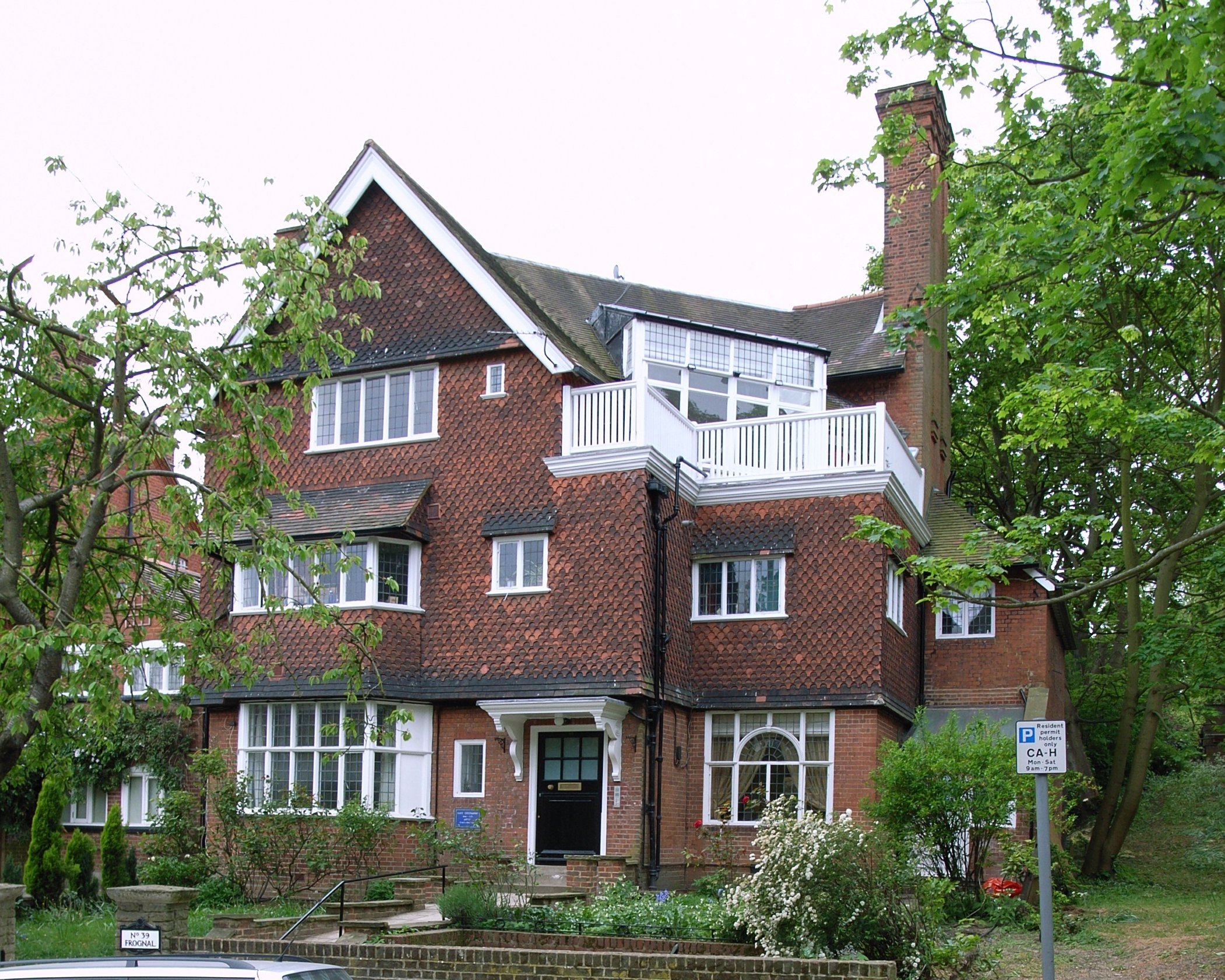
The house in Frognal built for Kate Greenaway by Richard Norman Shaw

In the 1880s, the most popular designers of bookplates were Greenaway, along with Crane and Aubrey Beardsley. Their work exhibited intricate Art Nouveau elements with flowing vines and floral patterns.

Greenaway was elected to membership of the Royal Institute of Painters in Water Colours in 1889. She exhibited her work at the Palace of Fine Arts at the 1893 World's Columbian Exposition in Chicago, Illinois. She lived in an Arts and Crafts style house she commissioned from Richard Norman Shaw in Frognal, London, although she spent summers in Rolleston.

Greenaway died of breast cancer in 1901, at the age of 55. She is buried in Hampstead Cemetery, London.

== Style ==
Greenaway's paintings were reproduced by chromoxylography, by which the colours were printed from hand-engraved wood blocks by the firm of Edmund Evans. Through the 1880s and 1890s, her only rivals in popularity in children's book illustration were Walter Crane and Randolph Caldecott.

"Kate Greenaway" children, all of them girls and boys too young to be put in trousers, were dressed in her own versions of late 18th century and Regency fashions: smock-frocks and skeleton suits for boys, high-waisted pinafores and dresses with mobcaps and straw bonnets for girls. The influence of children's clothes in portraits by British painter John Hoppner (1758–1810) may have provided her some inspiration. Liberty of London adapted Greenaway's drawings as designs for actual children's clothes. A full generation of mothers in the liberal-minded "artistic" British circles who called themselves The Souls and embraced the Arts and Crafts movement dressed their daughters in Kate Greenaway pantaloons and bonnets in the 1880s and 1890s. The style was often used by painter Maude Goodman in her depictions of children.

== Legacy ==
The Kate Greenaway Medal, established in her honour in 1955, was awarded annually by the Chartered Institute of Library and Information Professionals in the UK to an illustrator of children's books. In 2022, however, her name was controversially dropped as part of the terms of a sponsorship deal with Yoto to rebrand the Carnegie Medal for Writing and the Kate Greenaway Medal for Illustration under the single name “The Carnegie Medals”.

== Books illustrated ==
List of works
- Kingston, William, Infant Amusements, or How to Make a Nursery Happy, 1867.
- Aulnoy, Marie, Madame D'Aulnoy's Fairy Tales, 9 v., Gall and Inglis, 1871.
- Aunt Louisa's London Toy Books: Diamonds and Toads, Warne, 1871.
- Jeune, Margaret S., My School Days in Paris, London, Griffith and Farran, 1871.
- Knox, Kathleen, Fairy Gifts; or, A Wallet of Wonders, Griffith & Farran, 1874.
- Aunt Cae, The Children of the Parsonage, Griffith & Farran, 1874.
- Mulholland, Rosa, Puck and Blossom, Marcus Ward, 1874.
- Hill, Miranda, The Fairy Spinner, Marcus Ward, 1874.
- Jerrold, Alice, A Cruise in the Acorn, London, Marcus Ward, 1875.
- Clark, Mary Senior, Turnaside Cottage, London, Marcus Ward, 1875.
- Potter, Frederick Scarlett, Melcomb Manor: A Family Chronicle, London, Marcus Ward, 1875.
- Children’s Songs, London, Marcus Ward, c. 1875.
- Knox, Kathleen, Seven Birthdays; or, The Children of Fortune, Griffith & Farran, 1875.
- Quiver of Love, a Collection of Valentines (with Walter Crane), Marcus Ward, 1876.
- LaBlanche, Fanny, Starlight Stories Told to Bright Eyes and Listening Ears, Griffith & Farran, 1877.
- Russell, Rutherford, Tom Seven Years Old, London, Marcus Ward, 1877.
- Hunt, Mrs. Bonavia, Poor Nelly, London, Cassell, Petter, Gilpin, 1878.
- Campbell, Lady Colin, Topo: A Tale About English Children in Italy, Marcus Ward, 1878.
- Yonge, Charlotte Mary, Heartsease; or The Brother’s Wife, Macmillan, 1879.
- Yonge, Charlotte Mary, The Heir of Redclyffe, Macmillan, 1879.
- Pollock, Walter Herries, Amateur Theatricals, London, Macmillan, 1879.
- Toyland, Trot’s Journey and Other Poems and Stories, New York, R. Worthington, c. 1879
- Weatherly, George, The “Little Folks” Painting Book, Cassell, Petter, Gilpin, 1879.
- Weatherly, George, The “Little Folks” Nature Painting Book, Cassell, Petter, Gilpin 1879.
- A Favorite Album of Fun and Fancy, London, Cassell, Petter, Gilpin, c. 1879.
- Haile, Ellen, Three Brown Boys and Other Happy Children, New York, Cassell & Co., c. 1879.
- Haile, Ellen, The Two Gray Girls and Their Opposite Neighbours, New York, Cassell & Co., c. 1879.
- Under the Window, London, George Routledge, 1879. Engraved and colour printed by Edmund Evans.
- Barker, Mrs. Sale, Kate Greenaway's Birthday Book, London, George Routledge, 1880. Engraved and colour printed by Edmund Evans.
- Freddie’s Letter: Stories For Little People, London, Routledge, 1880.
- The Old Farm Gate, London, George Routledge, c. 1880.
- Lang, Andrew, The Library, London, Macmillan and Company, 1881.
- Locker, Frederick, London Lyrics, London, Macmillan and Company, 1881.
- Mother Goose; or, The Old Nursery Rhymes, London, Routledge, 1881. Engraved and colour printed by Edmund Evans.
- Foster, Myles Burkett, A Day in a Child’s Life, London, Routledge, 1882. Engraved and colour printed by Edmund Evans.
- Ranking, Montgomerie and Tully, Thomas K., Flowers and Fancies; Valentines Ancient and Modern, Marcus Ward, 1882.
- Weatherly, F. E., The Illustrated Children’s Birthday Book (with others), London, W. Mack, 1882.
- Taylor, Ann and Jane, Little Ann and Other Poems, London, Routledge, 1883. Engraved and colour printed by Edmund Evans.
- Zimmern, Helen, Tales from the Edda, London, Sonnenschein, 1883.
- Language of Flowers, London, Routledge, 1884. Engraved and colour printed by Edmund Evans.
- A Painting Book By Kate Greenaway, London, George Routledge, 1884. Engraved and colour printed by Edmund Evans.
- Ellice, Robert, compiler, Songs for the Nursery: A Collection of Children’s Poems, Old and New, W. Mack, 1884.
- Kate Greenaway’s Christmas Carols, London: George Routledge, c. 1884.
- Kate Greenaway's Alphabet, London, Routledge, 1885. Engraved and colour printed by Edmund Evans.
- Kate Greenaway's Album, London, Routledge, c. 1885. Engraved and colour printed by Edmund Evans. (only eight copies were printed)
- Marigold Garden: Pictures and Rhymes, London, Routledge, 1885. Engraved and colour printed by Edmund Evans.
- Mavor, William, English Spelling Book, London, Routledge, 1885. Engraved and colour printed by Edmund Evans.
- Ruskin, John, editor, Dame Wiggins of Lee and Her Seven Wonderful Cats, London, George Allen, 1885.
- A Apple Pie: An Old-Fashioned Alphabet Book, London, Routledge, 1886. Engraved and colour printed by Edmund Evans.
- Harte, Bret, The Queen of the Pirate Isle, Chatto & Windus, 1886. Engraved and colour printed by Edmund Evans.
- Baby's Birthday Book, London, Marcus Ward, 1886.
- Allingham, William, Rhymes for the Young Folk, Cassell and Co., 1887. Engraved and colour printed by Edmund Evans.
- Queen Victoria's Jubilee Garland, London, George Routledge, 1887. Engraved and colour printed by Edmund Evans.
- Browning, Robert, The Pied Piper of Hamelin, London, Routledge, 1888. Engraved and colour printed by Edmund Evans.
- Around the House, New York, Worthington, 1888.
- Kate Greenaway's Book of Games, London, Routledge, 1889. Engraved and colour printed by Edmund Evans.
- Cresswell, Beatrice F., The Royal Progress of King Pepito, London, Society for Promoting Christian Knowledge, 1889. Engraved and colour printed by Edmund Evans.
- Arnim, Mary Annette, The April Baby's Book of Tunes, London and New York, Macmillan, 1900. The first use of colour-lithography on any of Kate’s Books.
- Spielmann, Mabel H., Littledom Castle and Other Tales (with others), London, George Routledge, 1903.
- Dobson, Austin, De Libris Prose and Verse (with others), London, Macmillan, 1908, 1911.
- Almanack, London, Routledge, 1883–1895. Engraved and colour printed by Edmund Evans.

== Gallery ==
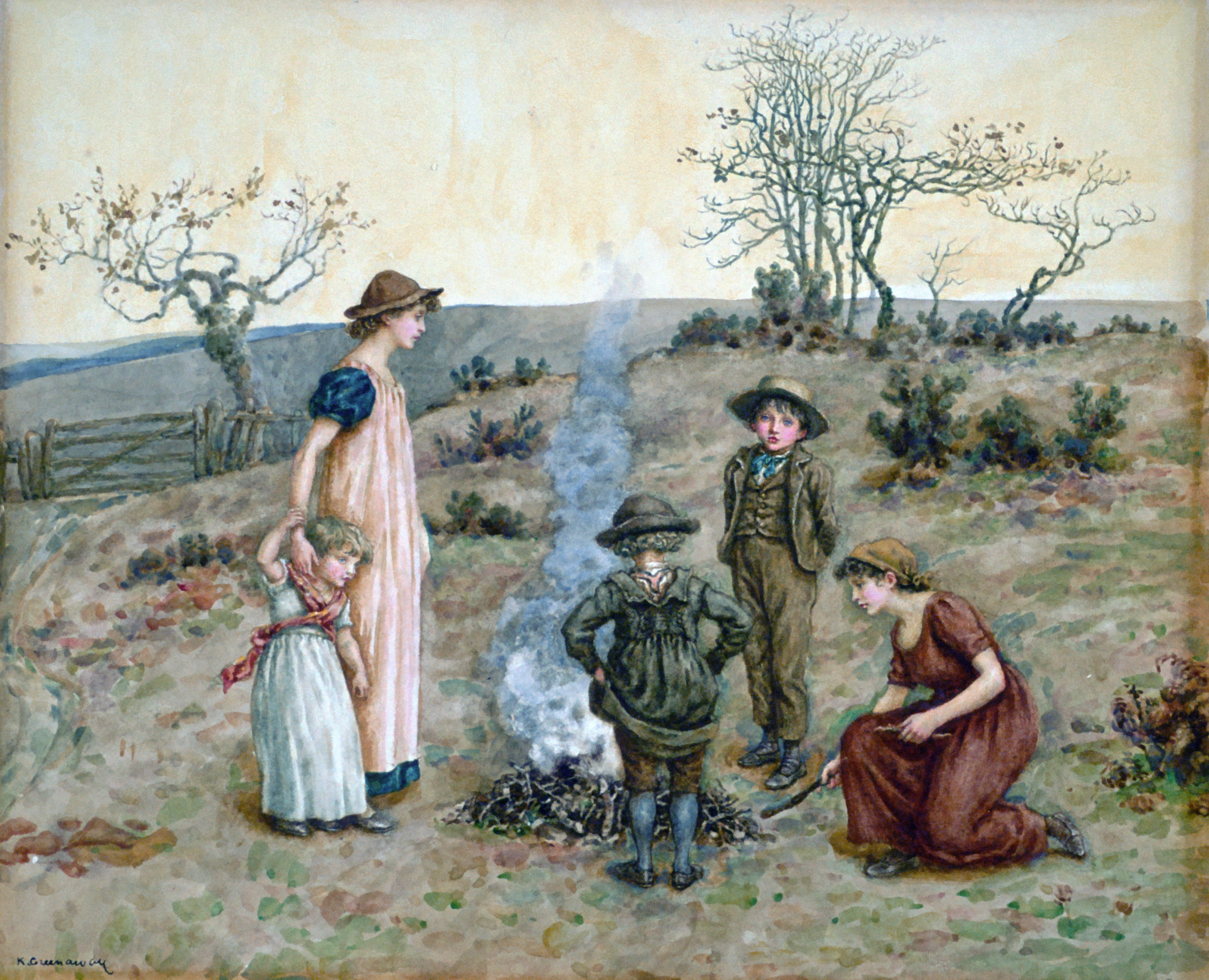
The Stick Fire – Kate Greenaway – 62 1924 114

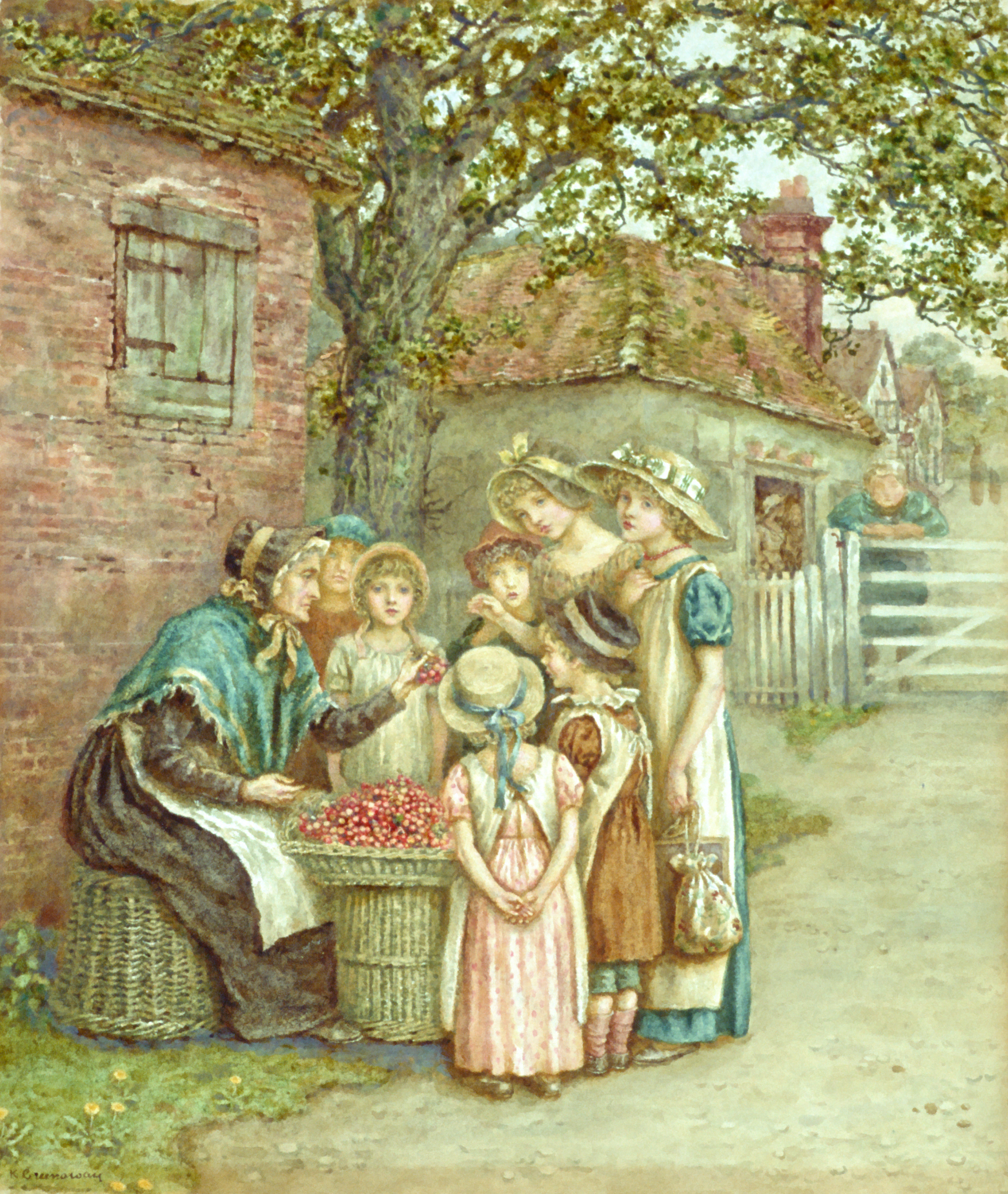
The Cherry Woman – Kate Greenaway – 62 1924 118

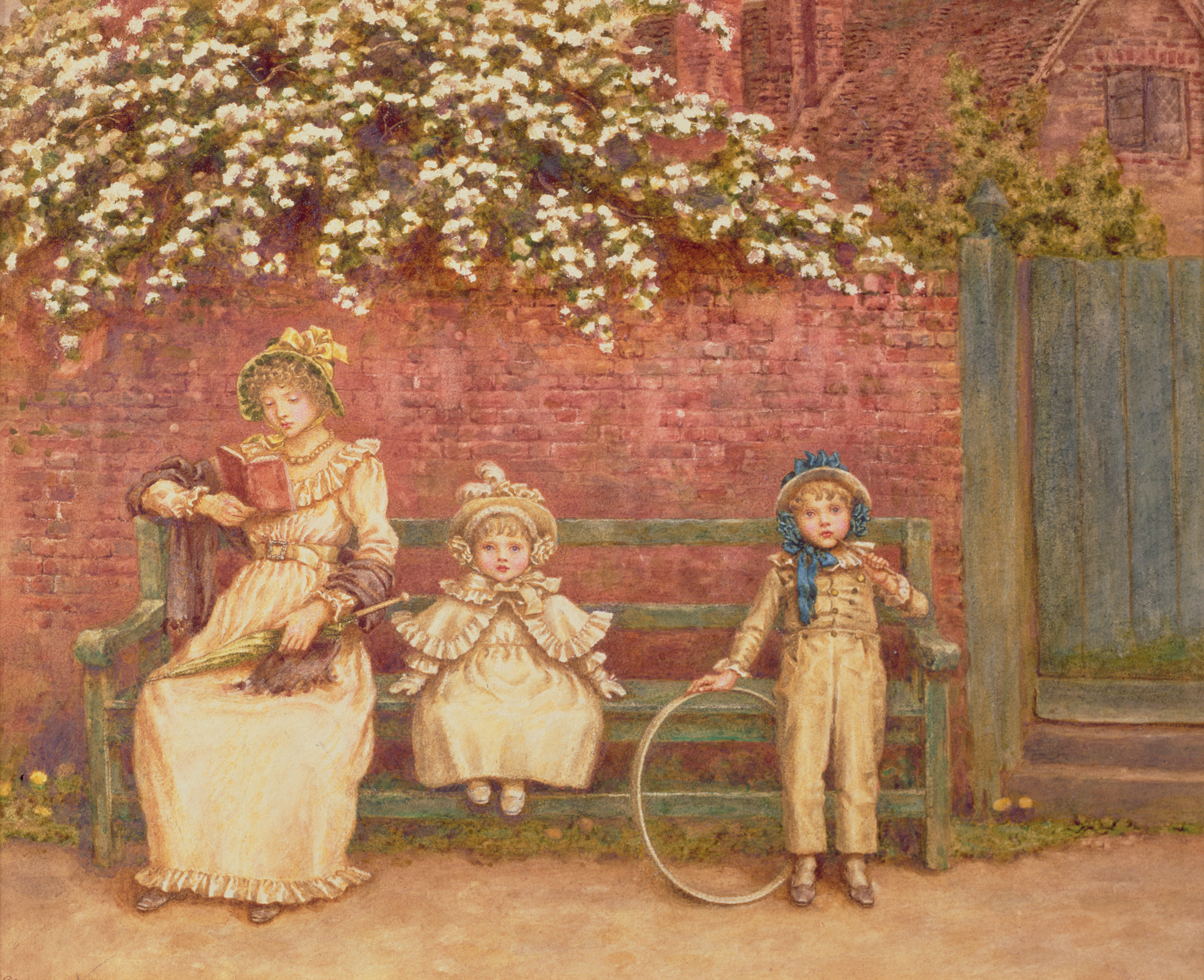
The Garden Seat – Kate Greenaway – 62 1924 111

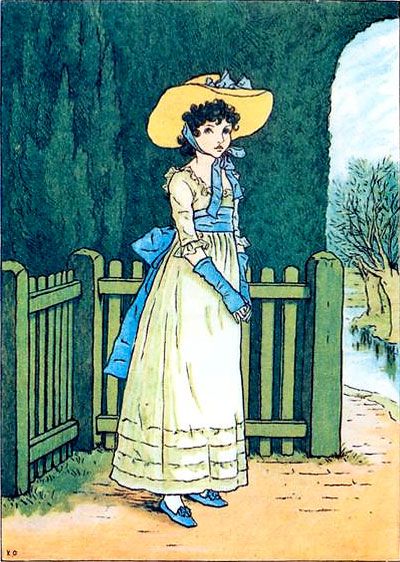
Marigold Garden

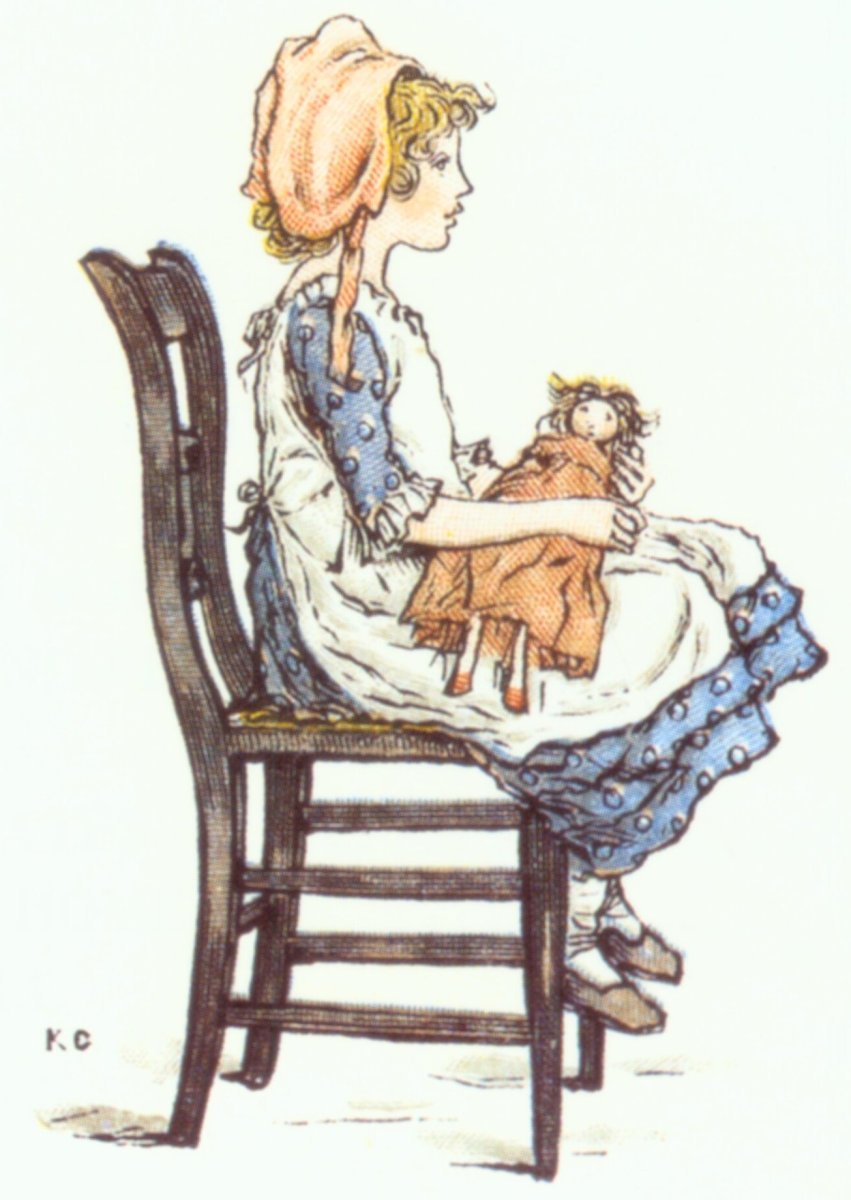
Polly from The Queen of the Pirate Isle, by Bret Harte

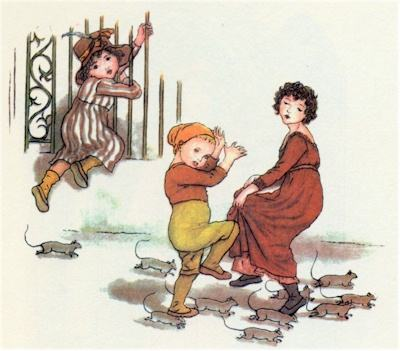
Rats of Hamelin

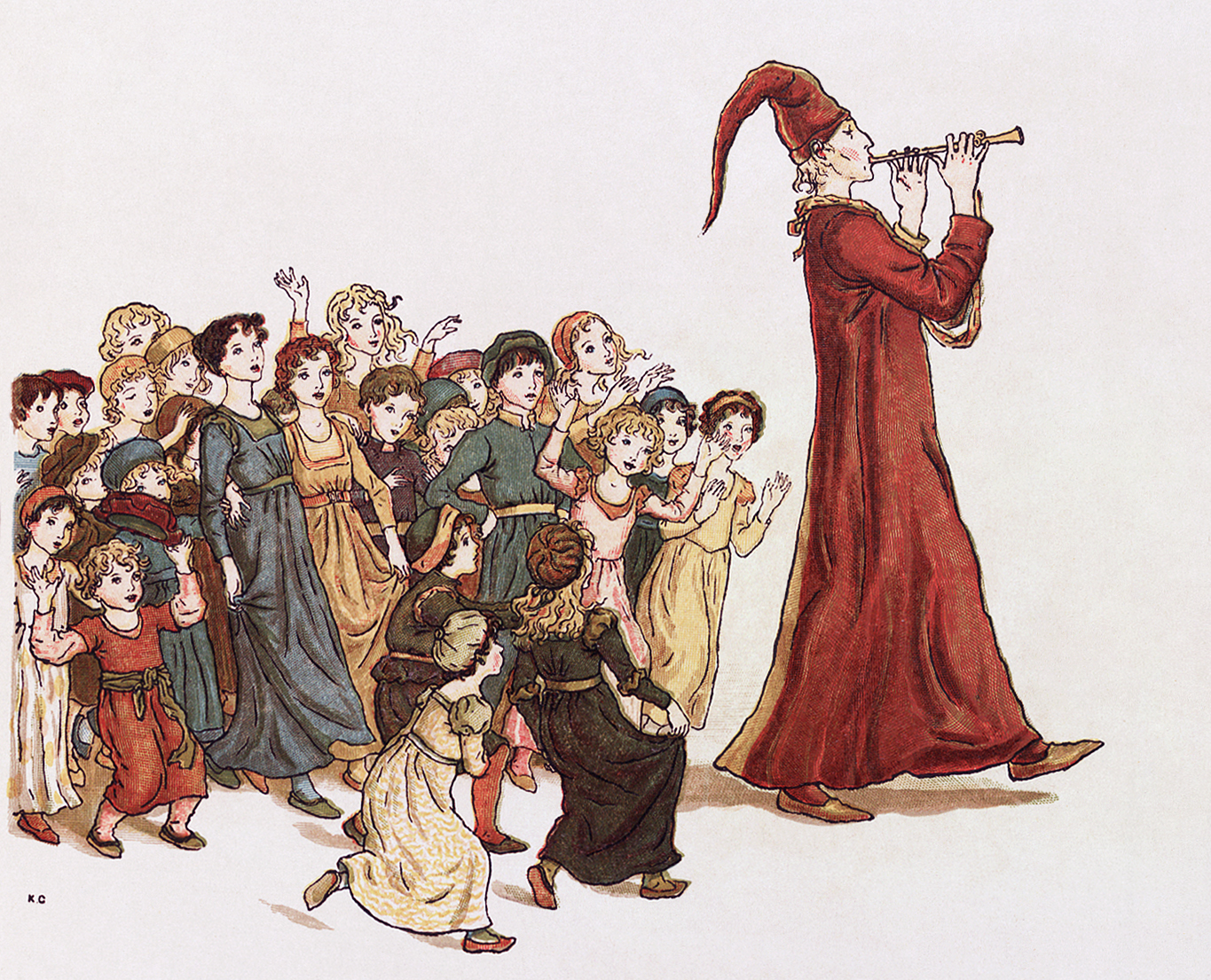
Greenaway's illustration of the Pied Piper leading the children out of Hamelin, to Robert Browning's version of the tale. Engraving by Edmund Evans.

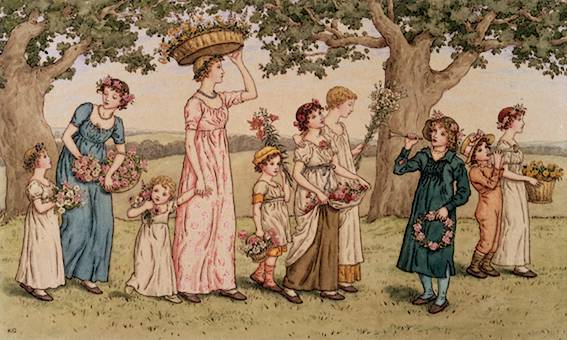
May Day

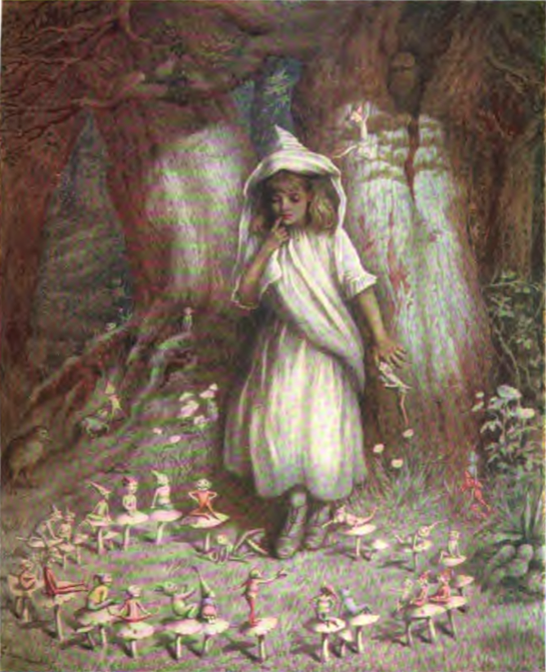
The Elf Ring

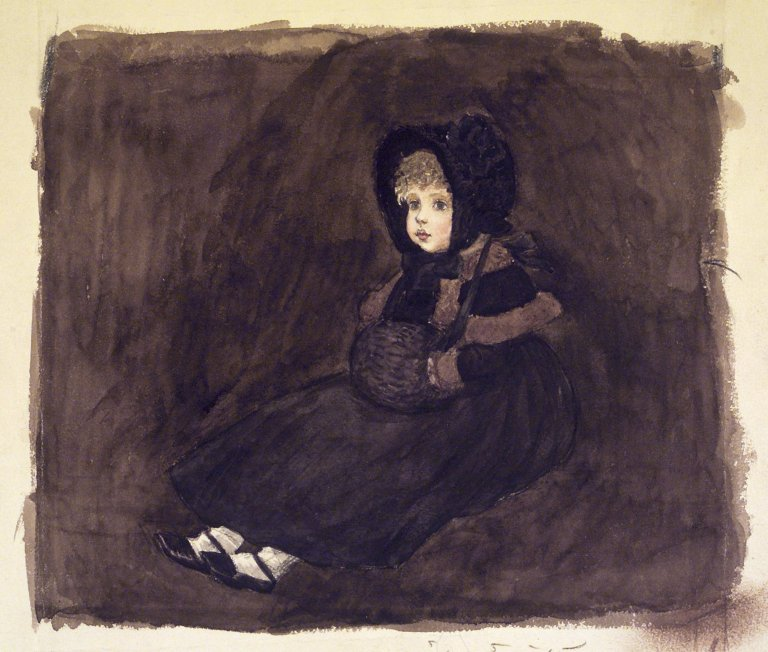
A Little Girl in a Muff

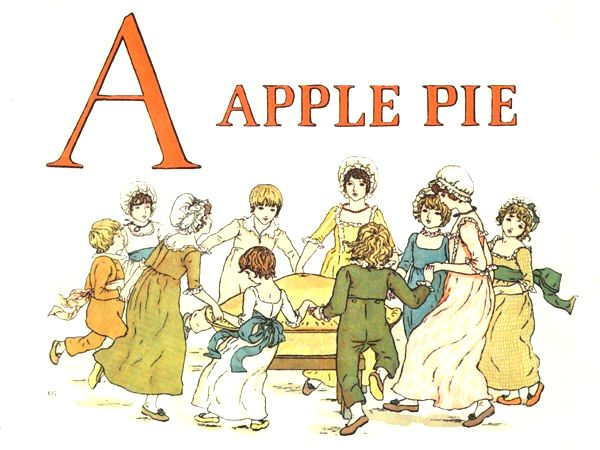
A apple pie: An Old-Fashioned Alphabet Book

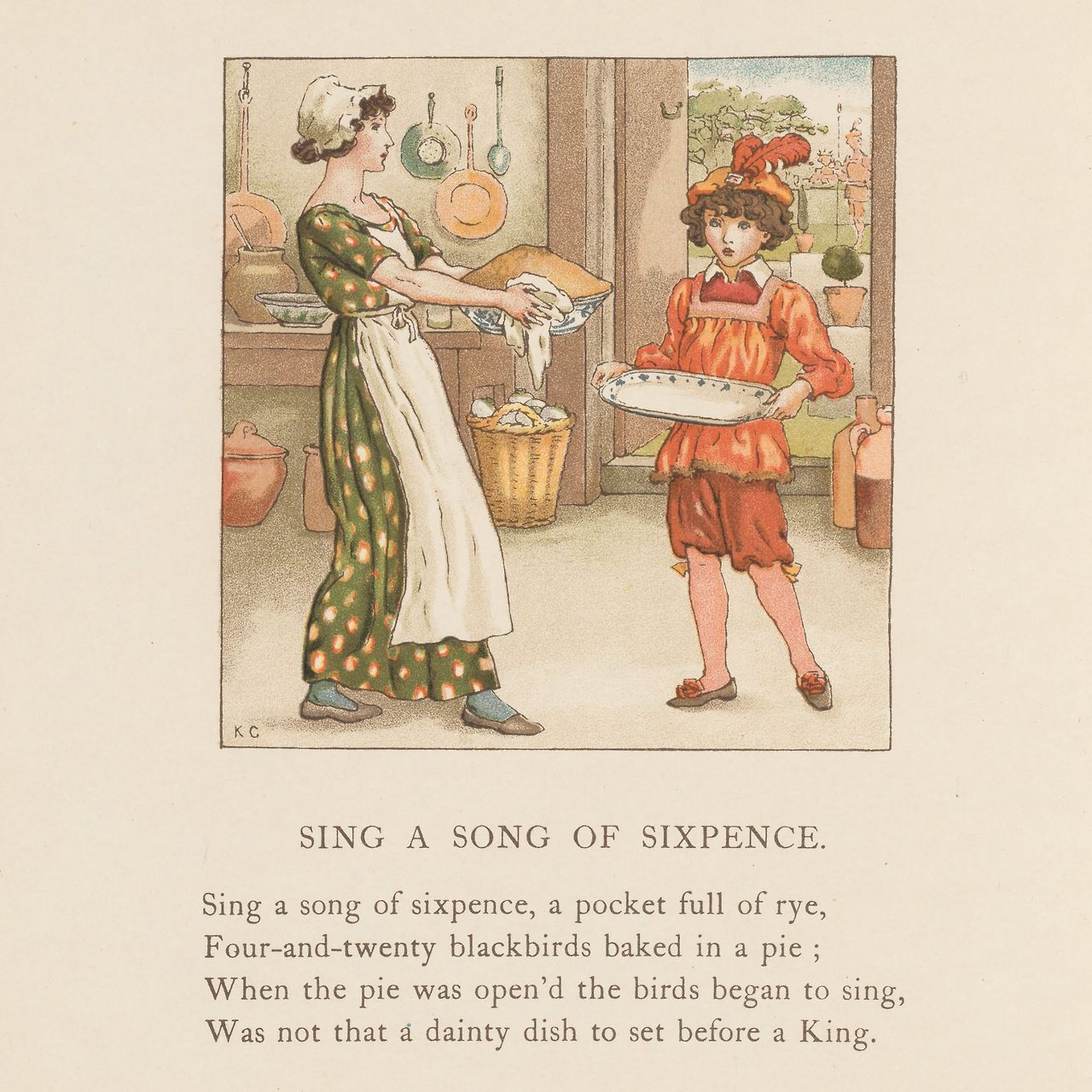
April Baby's Book of Tunes (1900), by Elizabeth von Arnim

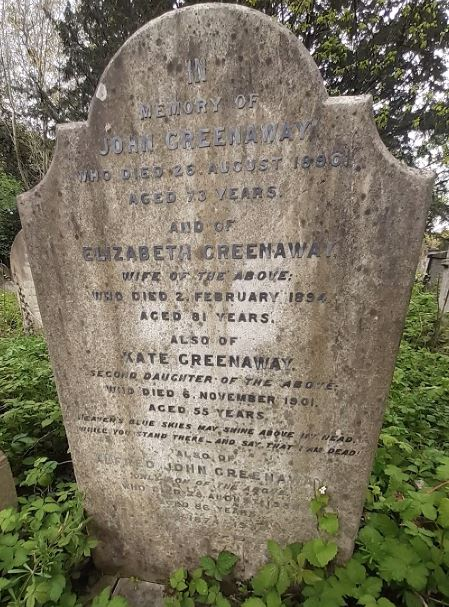
Grave of Kate Greenaway in Hampstead Cemetery
