= James Charles Harris =

English painter

Sir James Charles Harris, KCVO, (1831 – 8 November 1904) was British Consul at Nice from 1884 until 1901.

Born in Genoa, Kingdom of Sardinia in 1831, he was appointed Vice-Consul at Nice in 1881 and promoted to Consul in 1884. From 1888, he was also the Consul for the Principality of Monaco.

Sir James was the British Commissioner to the Nice Exhibition of 1884. He was awarded the Jubilee Medal in 1899 and the Coronation Medal in 1902. He was a member of the St James's Club.

His knighthood, the seventh awarded in the Royal Victorian Order, was provisionally bestowed by Queen Victoria at Nice in 1896. He was appointed a Commander of the Royal Victorian Order (CVO) in 1899 and promoted to a Knight Commander (KCVO) of the order in 1902.

Sir James was an accomplished water-colour painter, having studied with Rowbotham (or his father) at the Royal Naval School in London and with Alexis Mossa in Nice. He was an honorary member of the Royal Institute of Painters in Water Colours, and a founding member and Secretary of the Société des Beaux-Arts de Nice.

He was married to German baroness Gerhardine von Gall. They had three daughters and three sons. His eldest daughter Anna Lydia married Arthur von Eppinghoven, the youngest illegitimate child of Leopold I of Belgium.

Sir James died at Nice on 8 November 1904.
