= Thomas Rowbotham =

Thomas Rowbotham may refer to:

- Thomas Leeson Scrase Rowbotham, English watercolourist and oil painter
- Thomas Charles Leeson Rowbotham, his son, Irish watercolour landscape and marine artist and lithographer
