= Mulberry School for Girls =

Coordinates: 51.5141°N 0.0600°W

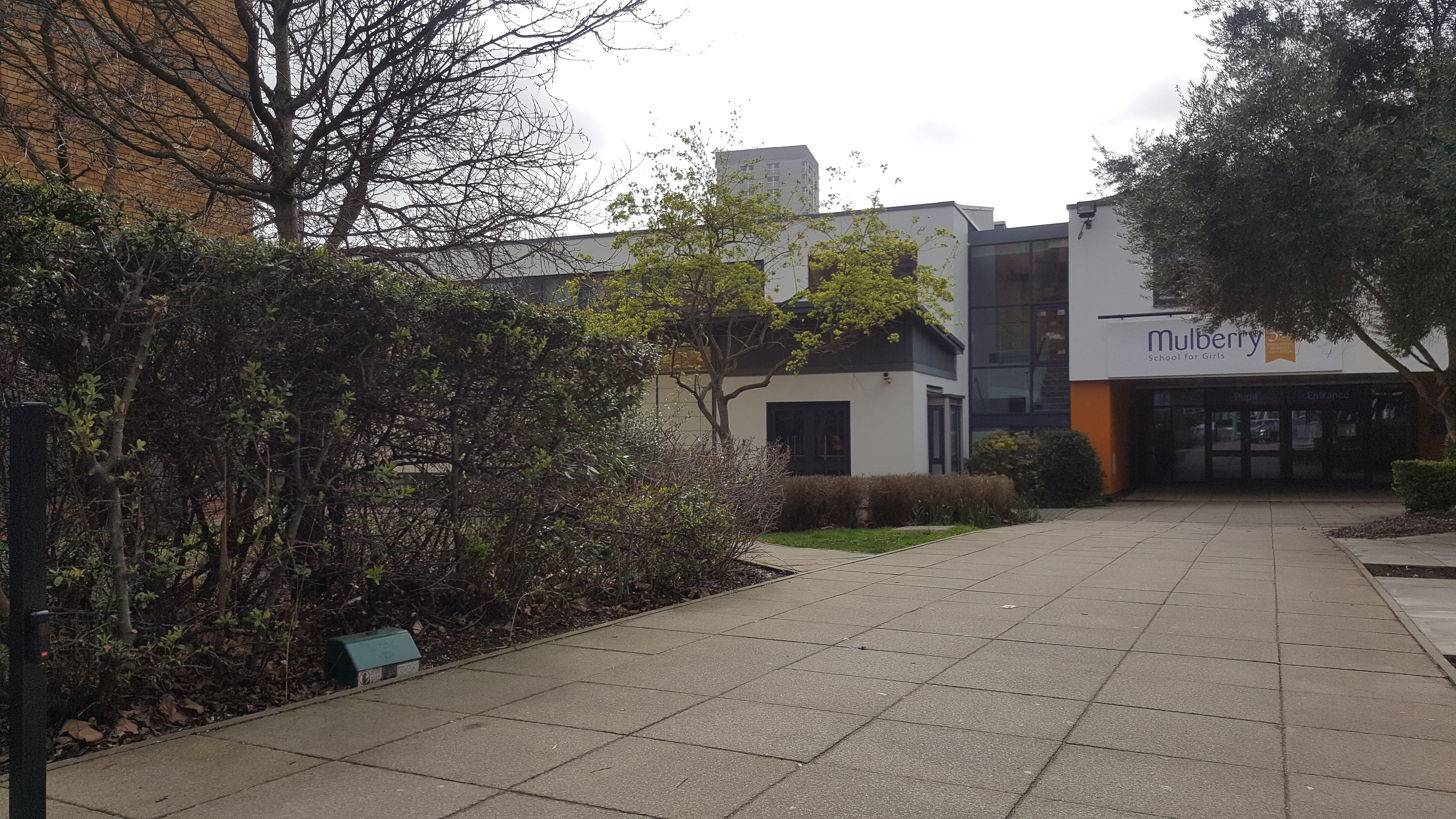
- Main entrance to school

Location
- Richard Street, Commercial Road; Shadwell; London, E1 2JP; England

Information
- Type: Academy
- Motto: Confidence, creativity, leadership and love of learning
- Established: 1963
- Founder: London County Council
- Local authority: Tower Hamlets
- Trust: Mulberry Schools Trust
- Department for Education URN: 143629 Tables
- Ofsted: Reports
- Headteacher: Alice Ward
- Gender: Girls
- Age: 11 to 19
- Website: www.mulberryschoolforgirls.org

Mulberry School for Girls (known up to 1986 as Tower Hamlets School for Girls) is a secondary comprehensive school and sixth form for girls located in the Shadwell area of the London Borough of Tower Hamlets, England. Approximately 1400 students aged between 11 and 19 years attend Mulberry School for Girls. The current headteacher is Alice Ward. The previous headteacher is Dr Vanessa Ogden CBE who joined Mulberry in 2006. Mulberry School for Girls is the founding school in the Mulberry Schools Trust.

The name of the school derives from the close association the black mulberry tree has with the East End of London and its weaving industries; being particularly closely associated with French Huguenot refugees who came to the capital in the 16th and 17th centuries.

The Huguenots knowledge of advanced French techniques revolutionised the existing East End weaving industry, leading to large scale planting of Mulberry trees in an attempt to support the thriving silk industry. The Bethnal Green mulberry tree is considered the oldest tree in the East End, and a sprig of mulberry is included in the coat of arms of the London Borough of Tower Hamlets. The Huguenot-vitalised East London weaving industry would later attract migrants from all over the British Isles as well as Jewish refugees from the Russian Empire and people from Bangladesh. The school has a mulberry-coloured (maroon or claret) school uniform.

In 2006 Mulberry school was designated a specialist school for the Arts in English, Media and the Expressive Arts.

In 2015, Mulberry School for Girls was visited by the First Lady of the United States, Michelle Obama, who launched her campaign Let Girls Learn and gave a speech to the girls at Mulberry School. On 17 July 2023 the UK Prime Minister Rishi Sunak visited the school and at a subsequent televised interview, announced the intention of the UK government to 'crack down on rip-off university degrees'. The school is part of a multi-academy trust supporting several schools in the London Borough of Tower Hamlets.

On 10 February 2021, the Department for Education announced the successful schools for the national roll-out of teaching school hubs. Mulberry School for Girls leads the East London Teaching School Hub (ELTSH) which was launched in September 2021. In March 2024, it was redesignated by the Department for Education for a further four years from 2024 to 2028.

== Current Leadership ==
Alice Ward is the current Headteacher. Dr Vanessa Ogden CBE, the CEO, was the former Headteacher of Mulberry School for Girls. She is also the CEO of the Mulberry Schools Trust. Dr Ogden was awarded a CBE in the King's New Year Honours List 2024.

== Student body ==
As of 2015 British Bangladeshis make up all but a few of the students. Additionally, the overwhelmingly largest religion among the student body at Mulberry, as of the same year, is Islam.

== Academic performance ==
As of 2015, about 83% of the students go on to attend university.

== Headteachers ==
Headteacher	From	To
Alice Ward	2022	present
Vanessa Ogden	2006	2022
Marlene Robottom	1991	2006
Daphne Gould	1974	1991
Doris Jarvis	1963	1974

== Notable pupils ==
Notable people to have attended the school include:

- Rushanara Ali - Labour MP
- Apsana Begum – Labour MP
