= W. J. Loftie =

British clergyman and writer

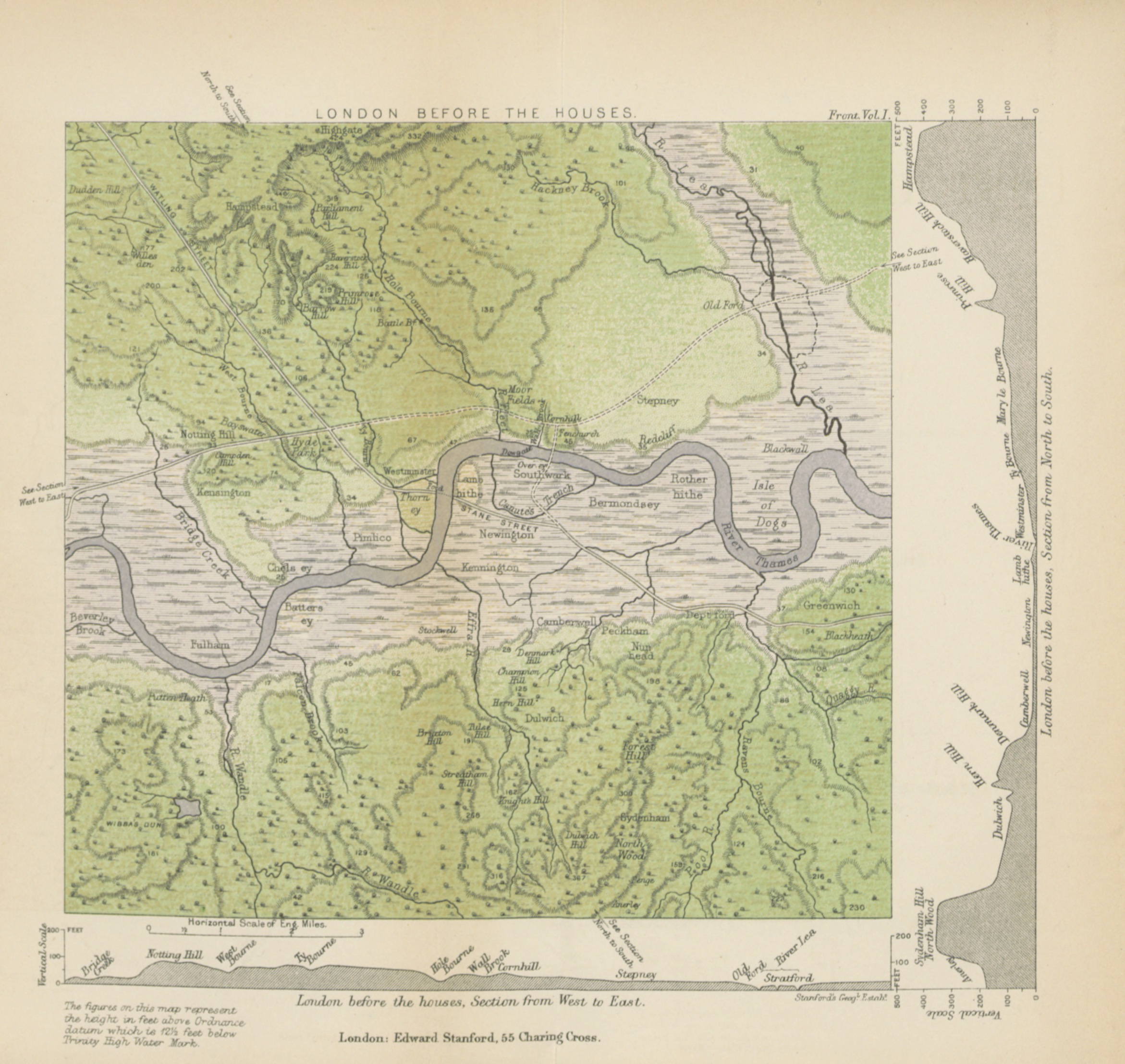
Map of London, showing major waterways, from Loftie's A History of London (1884).

William John Loftie (25 July 1839, Tandragee, County Armagh, Ireland – 16 June 1911) was a British clergyman and writer, on the history of London, travel, art and architecture.

== Biography ==
He was educated at Trinity College, Dublin. After holding church appointments, he joined the staff of the Saturday Review, and in 1894 that of the National Observer. As a writer on antiquarian subjects he combined learning and picturesque statement.

== Works ==
Published works:

- The Latin Year (1873)
- Views in the English Lake District (1875)
- English Lake Scenery (1875) with T. L. Rowbotham
- Picturesque Scottish Scenery from the Original Drawings of T. L. Rowbotham (1875)
- A Plea for Art in the House (1876)
- Views in North Wales from Original Drawings By T. L. Rowbotham (1875)
- In and Out of London: or, The Half-Holidays of a Town Clerk (1875)
- Views in Wicklow & Killarney (1876)
- Catalogue of the Prints and Etchings of Hans Sebald Beham (1877)
- A Ride In Egypt From Sioot To Luxor In 1879 (1879)
- Round About London, Historical, Archaeological, Architectural, and Picturesque Notes (1880)
- Queen Anne's Son: the Memoirs of William Henry, Duke of Gloucester, Reprinted from a Tract Published in 1789 (1881) editor
- A History of London (1883)
  - A History of London. Supplement to the First Edition (1884)
- An Essay on Scarabs (1884)
- Lessons in the Art of Illuminating (1885)
- Windsor: a Description of the Castle, Park, Town and Neighbourhood (1886)
- Marchfield: a Story of Commercial Morality (London: SPCK c.1886)
- Historic Towns London (1887)
- Kensington Picturesque & Historical (1888)
- Authorised Guide to the Tower of London, 2nd edition (1888); 1st edition 1886
- Orient Line Guide: Chapters for Travellers by Sea and Land (1890)
- Ye Oldest Diarie of Englysshe Travell: Being the hitherto unpublished narrative of the pilgrimage of Sir Richard Torkington to Jerusalem in 1517 (c.1890) editor
- London City: Its History, Streets, Traffic, Buildings, People (1891)
- Westminster Abbey (1891)
- The Cathedral Churches of England and Wales (1892)
- Inigo Jones and Wren: or, The Rise and Decline of Modern Architecture in England (1893)
- Inns of Court & Chancery (1893)
- Whitehall Historical and Architectural (1895)
- Reynolds and Children’s Portraiture in England
- Sir Edwin Landseer and Animal Painting in England (1897)
- Kensington Palace (1898)
- London Afternoons (1901) essays, as Rambles in and near London (1903)
- The Coronation Book of Edward VII, King of All the Britons and Emperor of India (1902)
- The Colour of London, historic, personal, & local (1907) illustrated by Yoshio Markino
- Victoria's London (1984) volume 1 reprint of London City
