= Rowbottom =

Rowbottom is a surname. For its origin and other variants, see Rowbotham. Uses include:

- Frederick Rowbottom, a British logician and mathematician
  - Rowbottom cardinal, the eponymously–named cardinal number he introduced
- Harry E. Rowbottom, U.S. Representative from Indiana (1925-1931)
- Jo Rowbottom, a British character actress
- Rowbottom (riot), a traditional form of civil disorder used at the University of Pennsylvania
