= Marlene Robottom =

British academic and educator

Dame Marlene Robottom is a British educator who retired in December 2005 as headteacher at the Mulberry School for Girls, Tower Hamlets, London.

== Honours ==
She was named a Dame Commander of the Order of the British Empire (DBE) in the 2000 New Year's Honours "for services to education".
