= Yoto =

Yoto may refer to:

- Yoto (audio player), a brand of digital audio players for children
- Yoto Prefecture, Maritime Region, Togo
- Yoto (prince) (1599–1639), first bearer of the Qing Dynasty title Prince Keqin
- Yoto Yotov (born 1969), Bulgarian and Croatian weightlifter
- Yōto Yokodera, the main character of the Japanese light novel series The "Hentai" Prince and the Stony Cat
- Yōtō (also The Amorous Blade), a 1926 film directed by Hiroshi Shimizu
- "Yōtō" (also "Demon Sword"), a 2011 episode of Garo: Makai Senki

== See also ==
- The Bane of Yoto, a 2012 novel by Josh Viola and Nicholas Karpuk
- Toko'yoto, the Chukchi god of the sea
