= Royal Naval School =

Defunct school in London, England

Coordinates: 51.4380°N 0.0386°E

Information
- Established: 1833 (boys' school); 1840 (girls' school)
- Closed: 1910 (boys' school); 1995 (girls' school)

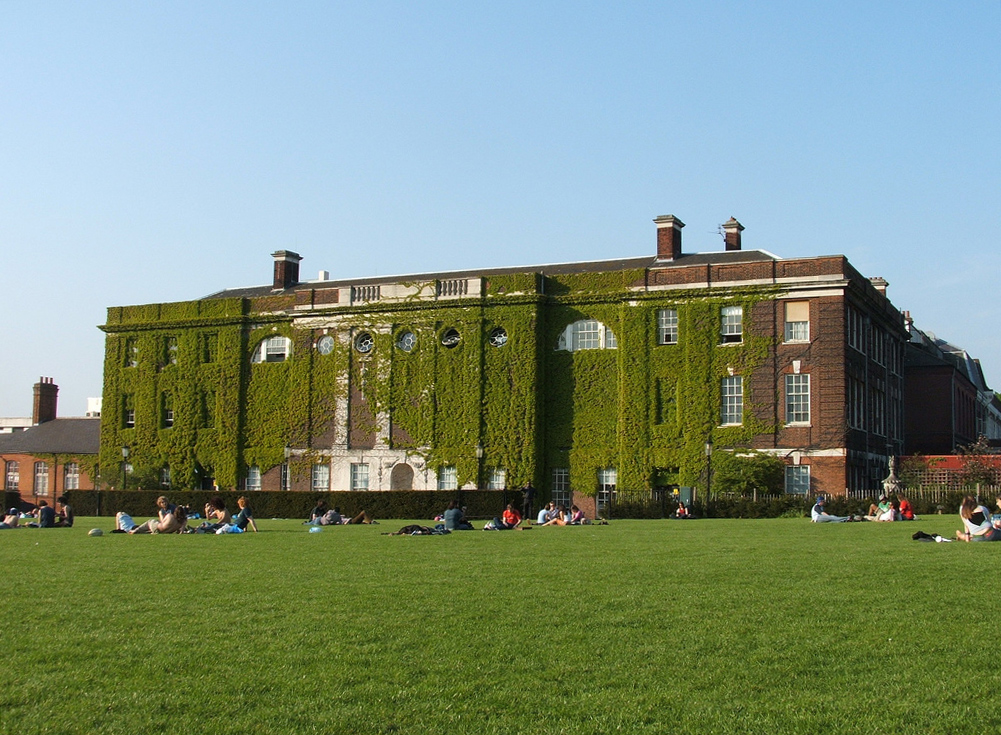
John Shaw's building at New Cross, now part of Goldsmiths College

Royal Naval School Act 1840
- Act of Parliament
- Parliament of the United Kingdom
- Long title: An Act for the Establishment and Government of the Institution called "The Royal Naval School".
- Citation: 3 & 4 Vict. c. lxxxvi
- Territorial extent: United Kingdom

Dates
- Royal assent: 19 June 1840
- Commencement: 19 June 1840 (Note: The Acts of Parliament (Commencement) Act 1793.)
- Repealed: 21 July 2008

Other legislation
- Repealed by: Statute Law (Repeals) Act 2008

Status: Repealed

Text of statute as originally enacted

The Royal Naval School was an English school that was established in Camberwell, London, in 1833 and then formally constituted by the Royal Naval School Act 1840 (3 & 4 Vict. c. lxxxvi). It was a charitable institution, established as a boarding school for the sons of officers in the Royal Navy and Royal Marines. Many of its pupils achieved prominence in military and diplomatic service. It was an important institution in the early education of many Royal Navy officers during the 19th century. The school closed in 1910.

== History ==
A purpose-built school building was designed by the architect John Shaw Jr, and opened in about 1844 at New Cross in south-east London (close to Deptford and Greenwich, both areas with strong naval connections). However, the school soon outgrew this building and relocated to Mottingham in 1889. (The building remained in educational use, being sold to the Worshipful Company of Goldsmiths for £25,000, and being re-opened by the Prince of Wales in July 1891 as the "Goldsmiths' Technical and Recreative Institute" – more commonly known simply as the "Goldsmiths' Institute". In 1904, it became the main building of Goldsmiths College.

The Royal Naval School remained at Mottingham (in a building today occupied by Eltham College) until it closed in 1910.

Author Ellen Thorneycroft Fowler was wife to one of the teachers at the Royal Naval School before it closed. Thomas Charles Leeson Rowbotham the artist also served as Professor of Drawing at the school in the mid 19th century.

== Royal Naval School for girls ==
Around the same time as the boys' school was founded, in 1840, The Royal Female School for the Daughters of Naval and Marine Officers was founded 'in a candle-lit, rented house on Richmond Green' which later changed its name to The Royal Naval School or RNS - as it is still known today by its old girls. RNS was due to the inspiration of Admiral Sir Thomas Williams, a Royal Navy officer of the late eighteenth and early nineteenth centuries, who had served with distinction in numerous theatres during the American Revolutionary War, French Revolutionary Wars and Napoleonic Wars. As stated on the dust jacket of the history of the school published in 1975, Williams

... realised that after the Napoleonic Wars there were hundreds of impecunious ex-Naval officers acutely in need of an economical means to educate their daughters to earn a living; entirely by the efforts of an influential group of distinguished Officers the necessary funds ware raised, the School established and Royal Patronage obtained... from Richmond, it moved on to the fine Kilmorey mansion beside the Thames, at St. Margaret's, where it grew and flourished until the building was destroyed by bombs in 1940. Difficult wartime moves first to Fernhurst and later to Stoatley Hall were a triumph for the headmistress, Miss Oakley-Hill, and paved the way for further expansion.

In 1995, The Royal Naval School for girls at Haslemere was amalgamated with The Grove School founded in 1864 to form The Royal School, Haslemere.

== Notable former pupils ==
- Major General Sir William Bridges (1861–1915)
- Robert Bruce Burnside (1862–1929) was an Australian barrister and judge
- Admiral Richard Vesey Hamilton (1829-1912)
- Sir James Harris (1831–1904), artist, British Consul in Nice and Monaco
- General Richard John Meade (1821–1894)
- Sir Charles Mitchell (1836–1899), governor of Fiji and the Straits Settlements
- Admiral Sir George Nares (1831–1915) Royal Navy officer and Arctic explorer
- Admiral Stuart Nicholson (1865–1936)
- Admiral Bedford Pim (1826–1886)
- Kivas Tully (1820–1905), architect
- William Hoste Webb (1820–1890), politician in Quebec

== Other schools with the same name ==
There are other schools by this name including Royal Naval School Tal-Handaq in Malta, the Royal Naval School in Colombo, Sri Lanka, then named Ceylon, which became the Overseas School of Colombo in 1957, and a school at Trincomalee Garrison, in eastern Sri Lanka.
