= Thomas Leeson Scrase Rowbotham =

English painter (1782–1853)

- Born: 1782; Bath, Somerset
- Died: 1853 (aged 70–71); Camberwell, London
- Known for: Watercolour, Oil painting

Thomas Leeson Scrase Rowbotham (sometimes called Thomas Leeson Rowbotham the Elder or Thomas Leeson Rowbotham Senior; and his third forename sometimes given as Scarse) (1782–1853) was an English watercolourist and oil painter. He was a skilled painter of landscapes and marine subjects, became professor of drawing at the Royal Naval School and produced books on painting and drawing. He contributed 258 watercolours of scenes from Bristol, England to the topographical collection of George Weare Braikenridge. The Braikenridge Collection makes Bristol's early 19th century appearance one of the best documented of any English city.

Rowbotham was born in Bath, Somerset in 1782, where he became a teacher of marine painting, cottage figures and landscape. His father had become owner of the Theatre Royal, Bath. Thomas moved to Dublin around 1812, where his son Thomas Charles Leeson Rowbotham (1823–75) was born.

By 1825, when he started working for Braikenridge, he had moved to Bristol. Besides the 258 watercolours, he also produced around 100 drawings for Braikenridge depicting views of Brislington, Bristol. In 1832 he also produced some large panoramas of Bristol. In 1832 and 1833 he collaborated with William James Müller to produce engravings of the Bristol Riots of 1831.

Rowbotham does not seem to have participated in the activities of the Bristol School of artists. However, in late 1832 or early 1833 Rowbotham was a founder member of the formal sketching club for evening sketching meetings, which was the successor of the more informal Bristol School.

Later he became professor of drawing at the Royal Naval School, New Cross, London. He wrote The Art of Landscape Painting in Water Colours, jointly with his son, and The Art of Sketching from Nature, for which his son provided the illustrations.

He died in 1853 at Camberwell, London. His professorship at the Royal Naval School was taken over by his son.

The Braikenridge Collection is in the Bristol City Museum and Art Gallery.
