= Thomas Charles Leeson Rowbotham =

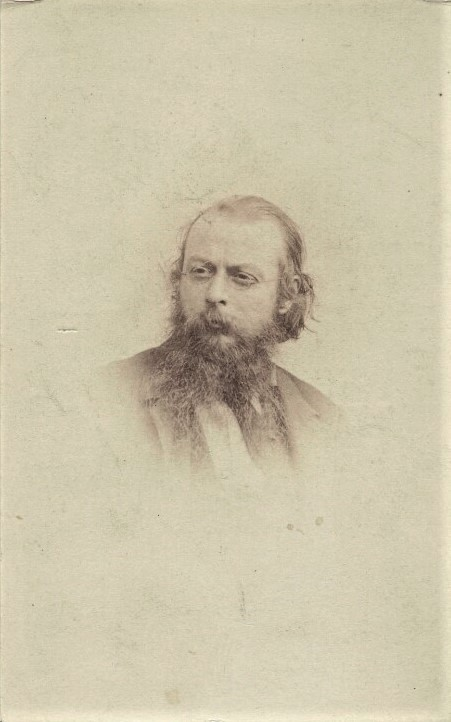
Thomas Charles Leeson Rowbotham

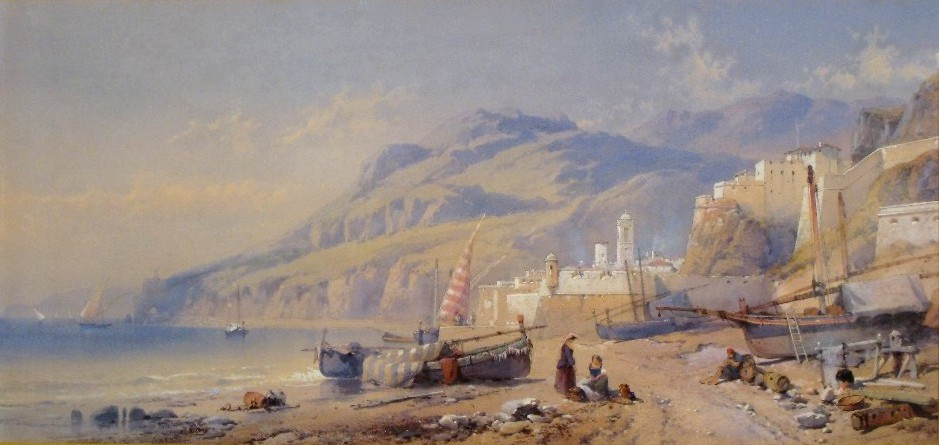
On the Coast near Genoa (1860)

Thomas Charles Leeson Rowbotham (1823 in Dublin – 30 June 1875 in Percy Lodge, Camden Hill, Kensington), was an Irish watercolour, landscape and marine artist and lithographer.

== Life ==
He was the son of the watercolour artist, Thomas Leeson Scrase Rowbotham (1783–1853). He was trained by his father and first did serious works in 1847 on a sketching trip to Wales. His work was exhibited at the Royal Academy and Suffolk Street Gallery and other prestigious galleries of the time and he was elected an associate of the Royal Institute of Painters in Water Colours in 1848 and a full member in 1851. He succeeded his father as Professor of Drawing at the Royal Naval School, New Cross in Greenwich. They collaborated on The Art of Landscape Painting in Water Colours, and he provided the illustrations for his father's work, The Art of Sketching from Nature.

He published several works of English, Scottish and Irish scenery.
