= William Morris =

English textile artist, author, and socialist (1834–1896)

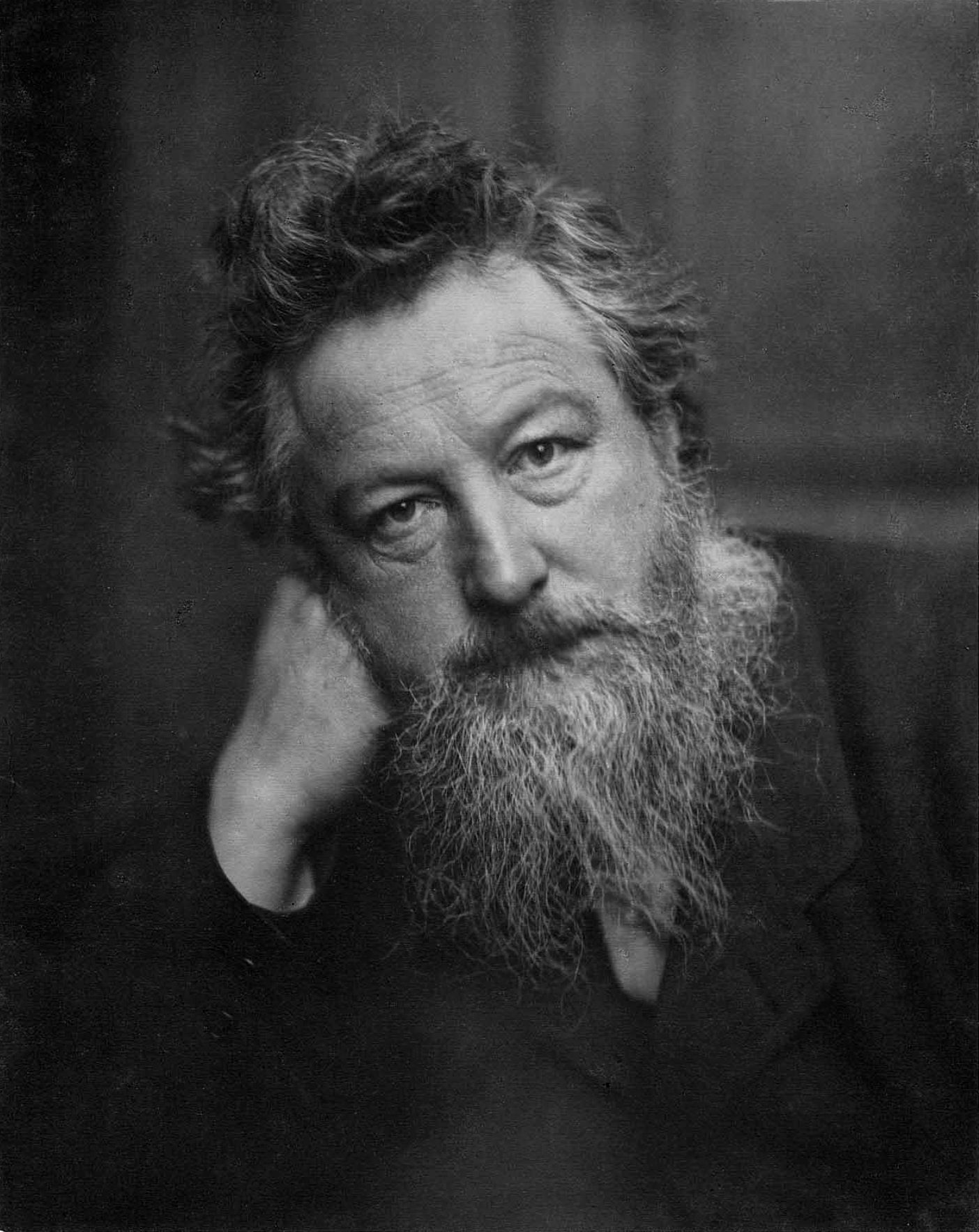
- William Morris by Frederick Hollyer, 1887
- Born: 24 March 1834; Walthamstow, Essex, England
- Died: 3 October 1896 (aged 62); Hammersmith, England
- Education: Exeter College, Oxford
- Occupations: Textile designer; poet; translator; socialist activist
- Known for: Wallpaper and textile design; fantasy fiction; medievalism; socialism
- Notable work: News from Nowhere, The Well at the World's End
- Spouse: Jane Burden (m. 1859)
- Children: Jenny Morris; May Morris

Signature
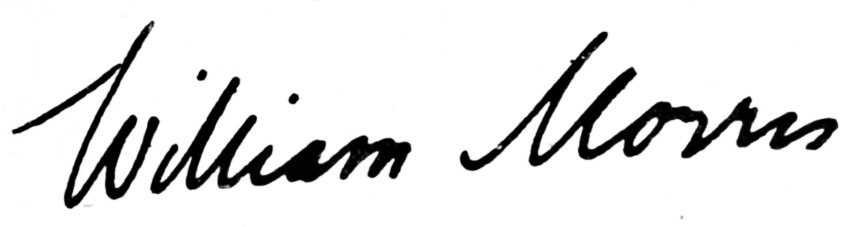

William Morris (24 March 1834 – 3 October 1896) was an English textile designer, poet, artist, writer, and socialist activist associated with the British Arts and Crafts movement. He was a major contributor to the revival of traditional British textile arts and methods of production. His literary contributions helped to establish the modern fantasy genre, while he campaigned for socialism in fin de siècle Great Britain.

Morris was born in Walthamstow, Essex, to a wealthy middle-class family. He came under the strong influence of medievalism while studying classics at Oxford University, where he joined the Birmingham Set. After university, he married Jane Burden, and developed close friendships with Pre-Raphaelite artists and poets such as Dante Gabriel Rossetti, Algernon Charles Swinburne, and Edward Burne-Jones, as well as with Neo-Gothic architect Philip Webb. Webb and Morris designed Red House in Kent where Morris lived from 1859 to 1865, before moving to Bloomsbury, central London. In 1861, Morris founded the Morris, Marshall, Faulkner & Co. decorative arts firm with Burne-Jones, Rossetti, Webb, and others, which became highly fashionable and much in demand. The firm profoundly influenced interior decoration throughout the Victorian period, with Morris designing tapestries, wallpaper, fabrics, furniture, and stained glass windows. In 1875, he assumed total control of the company, which was renamed Morris & Co.

From 1871, Morris rented the rural retreat of Kelmscott Manor, Oxfordshire, while also retaining a main home in London. He was greatly influenced by visits to Iceland with Eiríkur Magnússon, and he produced a series of English-language translations of Icelandic Sagas. He also achieved success with the publication of his epic poems and novels, namely The Earthly Paradise (1868–1870), A Dream of John Ball (1888), the utopian News from Nowhere (1890), and the fantasy romance The Well at the World's End (1896). In 1877, he founded the Society for the Protection of Ancient Buildings to campaign against the damage caused by architectural restoration. Through the influence of medievalism and Christian socialism in the 1850s he became a sceptic of industrial capitalism. After reading works of Henry George, Alfred Russel Wallace, and Karl Marx in the 1880s Morris became a committed revolutionary socialist activist until his final acceptance of parliamentary socialism in 1896. He founded the Socialist League in 1884 after an involvement in the Social Democratic Federation (SDF), but he broke with that organization in 1890. In 1891, he founded the Kelmscott Press to publish limited-edition, illuminated-style print books, a cause to which he devoted his final years.

Morris is recognized as one of the most significant cultural figures of Victorian Britain. He was best known in his lifetime for his poetry, although he posthumously became better known for his designs. The William Morris Society, founded in 1955, is devoted to his legacy, while multiple biographies and studies of his work have been published. Many of the buildings associated with his life are open to visitors, much of his work can be found in art galleries and museums, and his designs are still in production.

== Early life ==
=== Youth: 1834–1852 ===
Morris was born at Elm House in Walthamstow, Essex, on 24 March 1834. Raised into a wealthy middle-class family, he was named after his father, a financier who worked as a partner in the Sanderson & Co. firm, bill brokers in the City of London. His mother was Emma Morris (née Shelton), who descended from a wealthy bourgeois family from Worcester. Morris was the third of his parents' surviving children; their first child, Charles, had been born in 1827 but died four days later. Charles had been followed by the birth of two girls, Emma in 1829 and Henrietta in 1833, before William's birth. These children were followed by the birth of siblings Stanley in 1837, Rendall in 1839, Arthur in 1840, Isabella in 1842, Edgar in 1844, and Alice in 1846. The Morris family were followers of the evangelical Protestant form of Christianity, and William was baptised four months after his birth at St Mary's Church, Walthamstow.

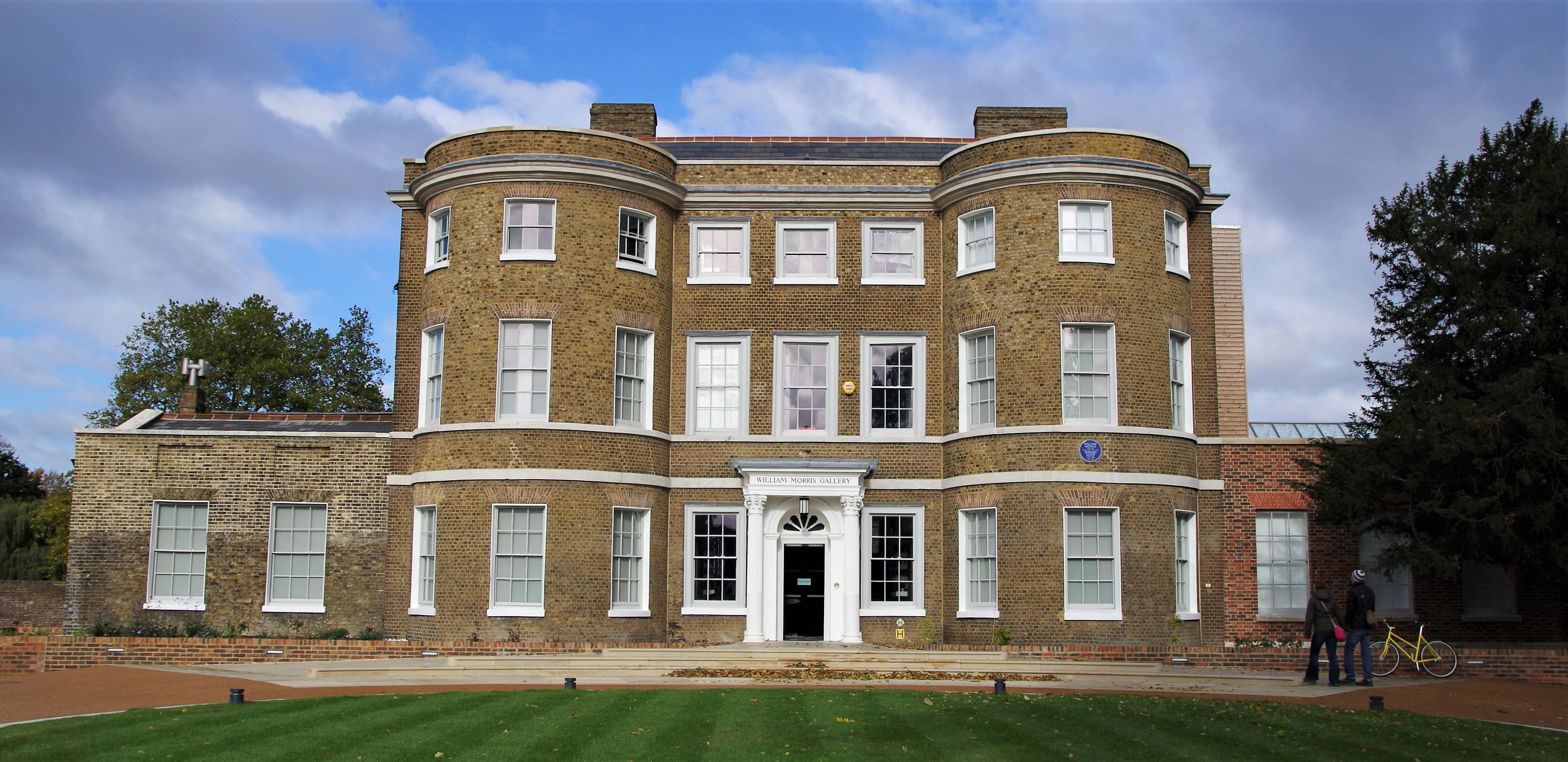
Water House, Morris's childhood home; renovated in 2012, it now houses The William Morris Gallery.

As a child, Morris was kept largely housebound at Elm House by his mother; there, he spent much time reading, favouring the novels of Walter Scott. Aged six, Morris moved with his family to the Georgian Italianate mansion at Woodford Hall, Woodford, Essex, which was surrounded by 50 acres of land adjacent to Epping Forest. He took an interest in fishing with his brothers as well as gardening in the Hall's grounds, and spent much time exploring the Forest, where he was fascinated both by the Iron Age earthworks at Loughton Camp and Ambresbury Banks and by the Early Modern Hunting Lodge at Chingford. He also took rides through the Essex countryside on his pony, and visited the various churches and cathedrals throughout the country, marveling at their architecture. His father took him on visits outside of the county, for instance to Canterbury Cathedral, the Chiswick Horticultural Gardens, and to the Isle of Wight, where he adored Blackgang Chine. Aged nine, he was then sent to Misses Arundale's Academy for Young Gentlemen, a nearby preparatory school; although initially riding there by pony each day, he later began boarding, intensely disliking the experience.

In 1847, Morris's father died unexpectedly. From this point, the family relied upon continued income from the copper mines at Devon Great Consols, and sold Woodford Hall to move into the smaller Water House. In February 1848 Morris began his studies at Marlborough College in Marlborough, Wiltshire, where he gained a reputation as an eccentric nicknamed "Crab". He despised his time there, being bullied, bored, and homesick. He did use the opportunity to visit many of the prehistoric sites of Wiltshire, such as Avebury and Silbury Hill, which fascinated him. The school was Anglican in faith and in March 1849 Morris was confirmed by the Bishop of Salisbury in the college chapel, developing an enthusiastic attraction towards the Anglo-Catholic movement and its Romanticist aesthetic. At Christmas 1851, Morris was removed from the school and returned to Water House, where he was privately tutored by the Reverend Frederick B. Guy, Assistant Master at the nearby Forest School.

=== Oxford and the Birmingham Set: 1852–1856 ===
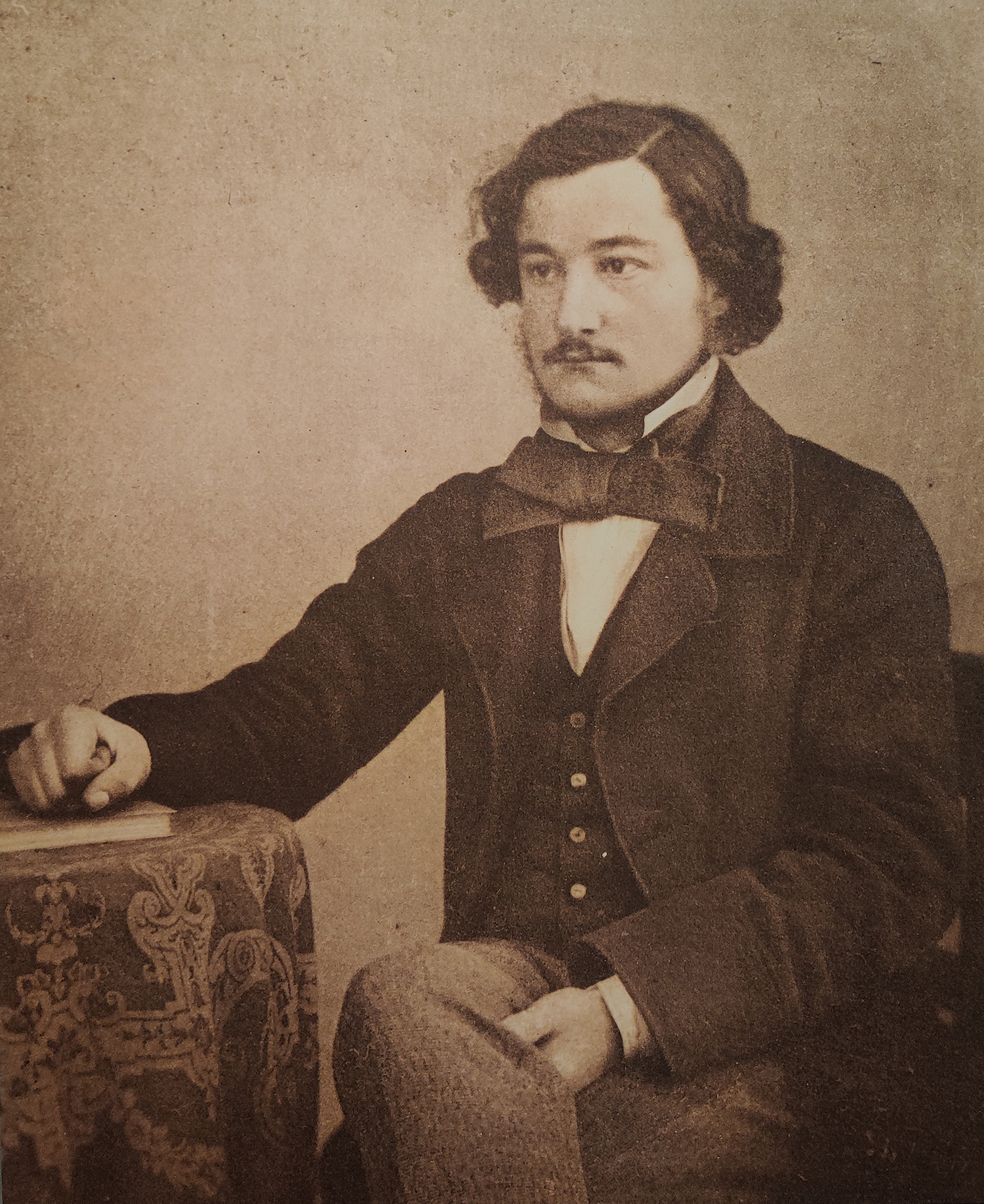
William Morris at 23

In June 1852 Morris entered Exeter College at Oxford University, although, since the college was full, he went into residence only in January 1853. He disliked the college and was bored by the manner in which they taught him Classics. Instead he developed a keen interest in medieval history and medieval architecture, inspired by the many medieval buildings in Oxford. This interest was tied to Britain's growing Medievalist movement, a form of Romanticism that rejected many of the values of Victorian industrial capitalism. For Morris, the Middle Ages represented an era with strong chivalric values and an organic, pre-capitalist sense of community, both of which he deemed preferable to his own period. This attitude was compounded by his reading of Thomas Carlyle's book Past and Present (1843), in which Carlyle championed medieval values as a corrective to the problems of Victorian society. Under this influence, Morris's dislike of contemporary capitalism grew, and he came to be influenced by the work of Christian socialists Charles Kingsley and Frederick Denison Maurice.

At the college, Morris met fellow first-year undergraduate Edward Burne-Jones, who became his lifelong friend and collaborator. Although from very different backgrounds, they found that they had a shared attitude to life, both being keenly interested in Anglo-Catholicism and Arthurianism. Through Burne-Jones, Morris joined a group of undergraduates from Birmingham who were studying at Pembroke College: William Fulford (1831–1882), Richard Watson Dixon, Charles Faulkner, and Cormell Price. They were known among themselves as the "Brotherhood" and to historians as the Birmingham Set. Morris was the most affluent member of the Set, and was generous with his wealth toward the others. Like Morris, the Set were fans of the poet Alfred, Lord Tennyson, and would meet together to recite the plays of William Shakespeare.

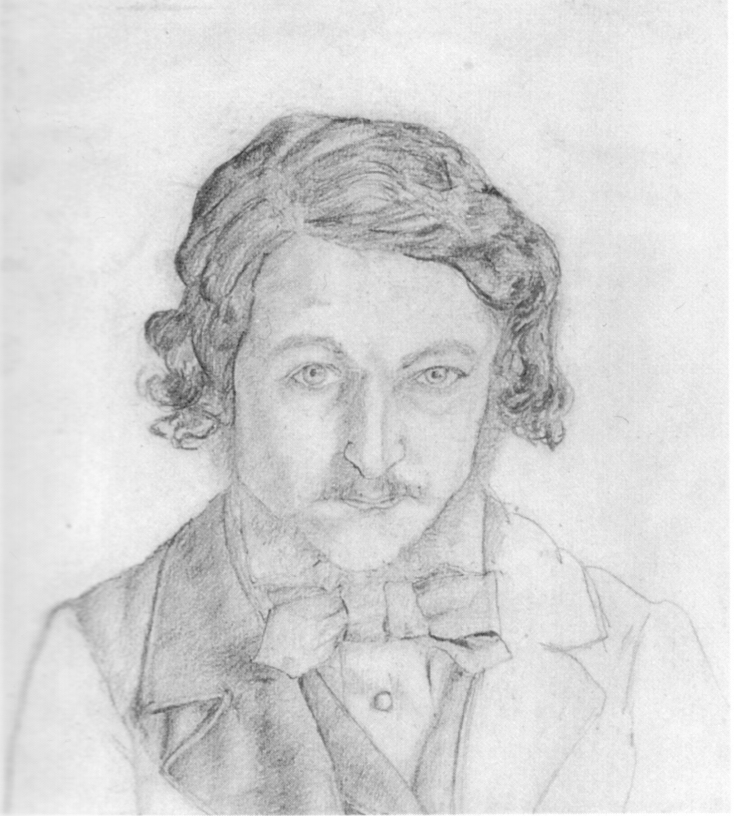
William Morris self-portrait, 1856; he grew his beard that year, after leaving university.

Morris was heavily influenced by the writings of the art critic John Ruskin, being particularly inspired by his chapter "On the Nature of Gothic Architecture" in the second volume of The Stones of Venice; he later described it as "one of the very few necessary and inevitable utterances of the century". Morris adopted Ruskin's philosophy of rejecting the tawdry industrial manufacture of decorative arts and architecture in favour of a return to hand-craftsmanship, raising artisans to the status of artists, creating art that should be affordable and hand-made, with no hierarchy of artistic mediums. Ruskin had achieved attention in Victorian society for championing the art of a group of painters who had emerged in London in 1848 calling themselves the Pre-Raphaelite Brotherhood. The Pre-Raphaelite style was heavily Medievalist and Romanticist, emphasising abundant detail, intense colours and complex compositions; it greatly impressed Morris and the Set. Influenced both by Ruskin and by John Keats, Morris began to spend more time writing poetry, in a style that was imitative of much of theirs.

Both he and Burne-Jones were influenced by the Romanticist milieu and the Anglo-Catholic movement, and decided to become clergymen in order to found a monastery where they could live a life of chastity and dedication to artistic pursuit, akin to that of the contemporary Nazarene movement. However, as time went on Morris became increasingly critical of Anglican doctrine and the idea faded. In summer 1854, Morris travelled to Belgium to look at medieval paintings, and in July 1855 went with Burne-Jones and Fulford across northern France, visiting medieval churches and cathedrals. It was on this trip that he and Burne-Jones committed themselves to "a life of art". For Morris, this decision resulted in a strained relationship with his family, who believed that he should have entered either commerce or the clergy. On a subsequent visit to Birmingham, Morris discovered Thomas Malory's Le Morte d'Arthur, which became a core Arthurian text for him and Burne-Jones. In January 1856, the Set began publication of The Oxford and Cambridge Magazine, designed to contain "mainly Tales, Poetry, friendly critiques and social articles". Funded mainly by Morris, who briefly served as editor and heavily contributed to it with his own stories, poems, reviews and articles, the magazine lasted for twelve issues, and garnered praise from Tennyson and Ruskin.

=== Apprenticeship, the Pre-Raphaelites, and marriage: 1856–1859 ===
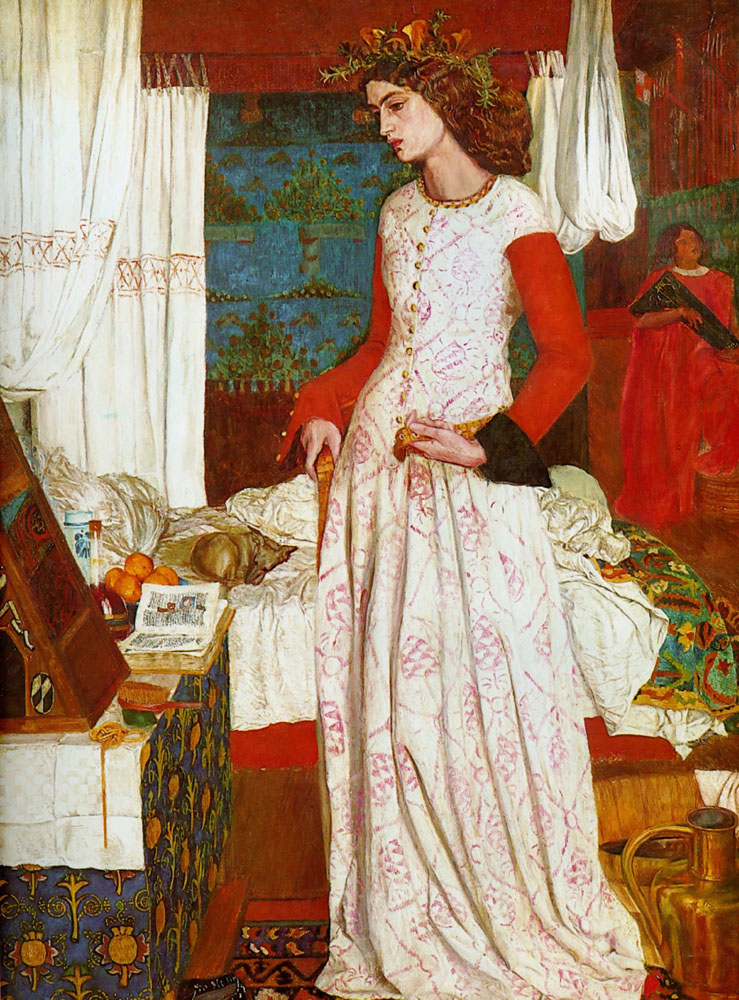
Morris's 1858 painting La belle Iseult, also inaccurately called Queen Guinevere, is his only surviving easel painting, now in the Tate Gallery. The model is Jane Burden, who married Morris in 1859.

Having passed his finals and been awarded a BA, Morris began an apprenticeship with the Oxford-based Neo-Gothic architect George Edmund Street in January 1856. His apprenticeship focused on architectural drawing, and there he was placed under the supervision of the young architect Philip Webb, who became a close friend. Morris soon relocated to Street's London office, in August 1856 moving into a flat in Bloomsbury in Central London with Burne-Jones, an area perhaps chosen for its avant-garde associations. Morris was fascinated by London but dismayed at its pollution and rapid expansion into neighbouring countryside, describing it as "the spreading sore".

William Morris became increasingly fascinated with the idyllic Medievalist depictions of rural life which appeared in the paintings of the Pre-Raphaelites, and spent large sums of money purchasing such artworks. Burne-Jones shared this interest, but took it further by becoming an apprentice to one of the foremost Pre-Raphaelite painters, Dante Gabriel Rossetti; the three soon became close friends. Through Rossetti, Morris came to associate with poet Robert Browning, and the artists Arthur Hughes, Thomas Woolner, and Ford Madox Brown. Tired of architecture, Morris abandoned his apprenticeship, with Rossetti persuading him to take up painting instead, which he chose to do in the Pre-Raphaelite style. Morris aided Rossetti and Burne-Jones in painting the Arthurian murals at the Oxford Union, although his contributions were widely deemed inferior and unskilled compared to those of the others. At Rossetti's recommendation, Morris and Burne-Jones moved in together to the flat at Bloomsbury's No. 17 Red Lion Square by November 1856. Morris designed and commissioned furniture for the flat in a medieval style, much of which he painted with Arthurian scenes in a direct rejection of mainstream artistic tastes.

Morris also continued writing poetry and began designing illuminated manuscripts and embroidered hangings. In March 1857 Bell and Dandy published a book of Morris's poems, The Defence of Guenevere, which was largely self-funded by the author. It did not sell well and garnered few reviews, most of which were unsympathetic. Disconcerted, Morris would not publish again for a further eight years. In October 1857 Morris met Jane Burden, a woman from a poor working-class background, at a theatre performance. Rossetti initially asked her to model for him. Controversially both Rossetti and Morris were smitten with her; Morris, however, began a relationship with her and they were engaged in spring 1858; Burden would later admit that she had never loved Morris. They were married in a low-key ceremony held at St Michael at the North Gate church in Oxford on 26 April 1859, before honeymooning in Bruges, Belgium, and settling temporarily at 41 Great Ormond Street, London.

== Career and fame ==
=== Red House and the Firm: 1859–1865 ===
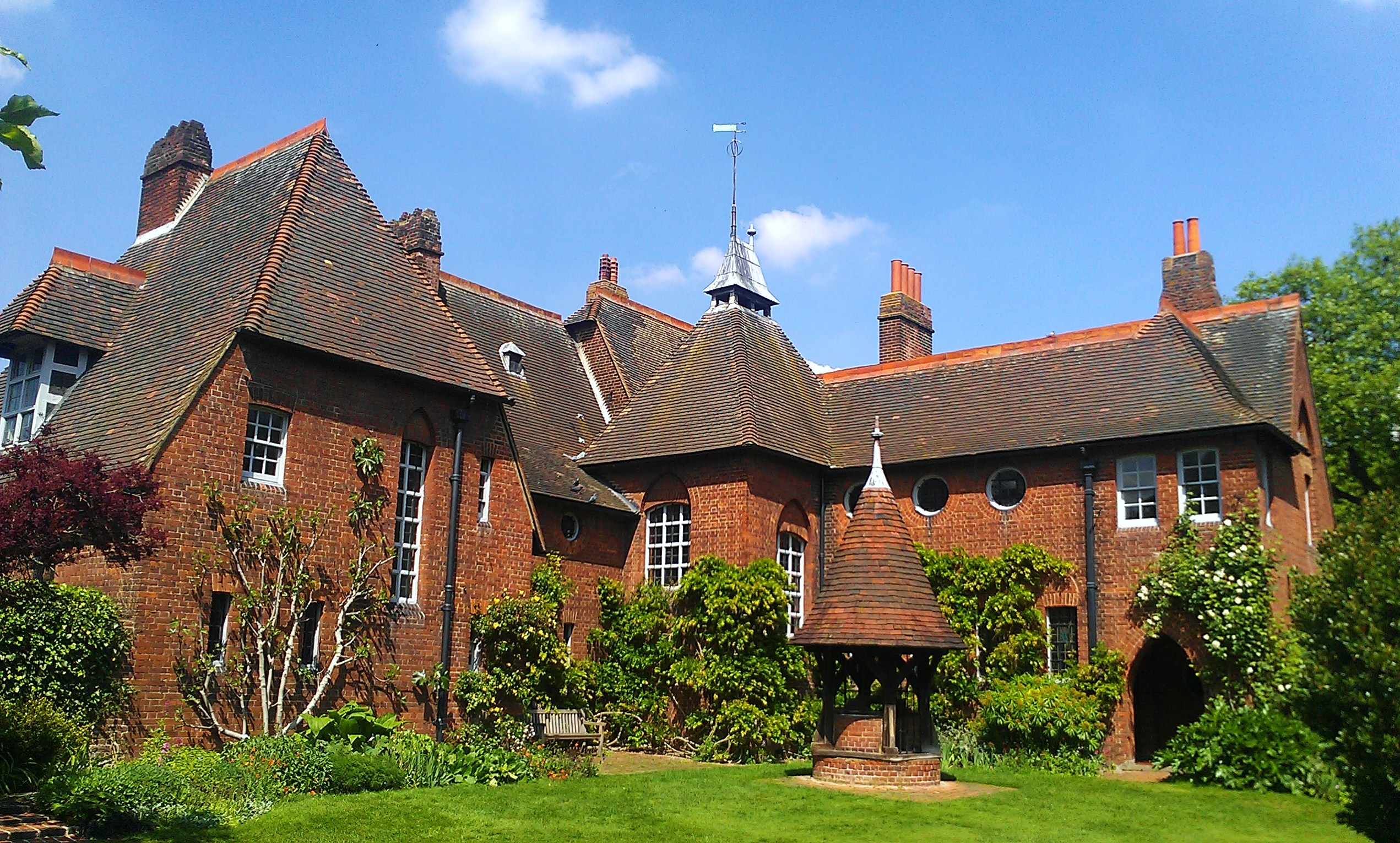
Red House in Bexleyheath; it is now owned by The National Trust and open to visitors.

Morris desired a new home for himself and his family resulting in the construction of the Red House in the Kentish hamlet of Upton near Bexleyheath, ten miles from central London. The building's design was a co-operative effort, with Morris focusing on the interiors and the exterior being designed by Webb, for whom the House represented his first commission as an independent architect. Named after the red bricks and red tiles from which it was constructed, Red House rejected architectural norms by being L-shaped. Influenced by various forms of contemporary Neo-Gothic architecture, the House was nevertheless unique, with Morris describing it as "very mediaeval in spirit". Situated within an orchard, the house and garden were intricately linked in their design. It took a year to construct, and cost Morris £4000 at a time when his fortune was greatly reduced by a dramatic fall in the price of his shares. Burne-Jones described it as "the beautifullest place on Earth."

After construction, Morris invited friends to visit, most notably Burne-Jones and his wife Georgiana, as well as Rossetti and his wife Lizzie Siddal. They aided him in painting decoration on the furniture, walls, and ceilings, much of it based on Arthurian tales, the Trojan War, and Geoffrey Chaucer's stories, while he also designed floral embroideries for the rooms. They also spent much time playing tricks on each other, enjoying games like hide and seek, and singing while accompanied by the piano. Siddall stayed at the House during summer and autumn 1861 as she recovered from a traumatic miscarriage and an addiction to laudanum; she would die of an overdose in February 1862.

In April 1861, Morris founded a decorative arts company, Morris, Marshall, Faulkner & Co., with six other partners: Burne-Jones, Rossetti, Webb, Ford Madox Brown, Charles Faulkner, and Peter Paul Marshall. Operating from premises at No. 6 Red Lion Square, they referred to themselves as "the Firm" and were intent on adopting Ruskin's ideas of reforming British attitudes to production. They hoped to reinstate decoration as one of the fine arts and adopted an ethos of affordability and anti-elitism. For additional staff, they employed boys from the Industrial Home for Destitute Boys in Euston, central London, many of whom were trained as apprentices.

Although working within the Neo-Gothic school of design, they differed from Neo-Gothic architects like George Gilbert Scott who simply included certain Gothic features on modern styles of building; instead they sought to return completely to Medieval Gothic methods of craftmanship. The products created by the Firm included furniture, architectural carving, metalwork, stained glass windows, and murals. Their stained glass windows proved a particular success in the firm's early years as they were in high demand for the surge in the Neo-Gothic construction and refurbishment of churches, many of which were commissioned by the architect George Frederick Bodley. Despite Morris's anti-elitist ethos, the Firm soon became increasingly popular and fashionable with the bourgeoisie, particularly following their exhibit at the 1862 International Exhibition in South Kensington, where they received press attention and medals of commendation. However, they faced much opposition from established design companies, particularly those belonging to the Neo-Classical school.

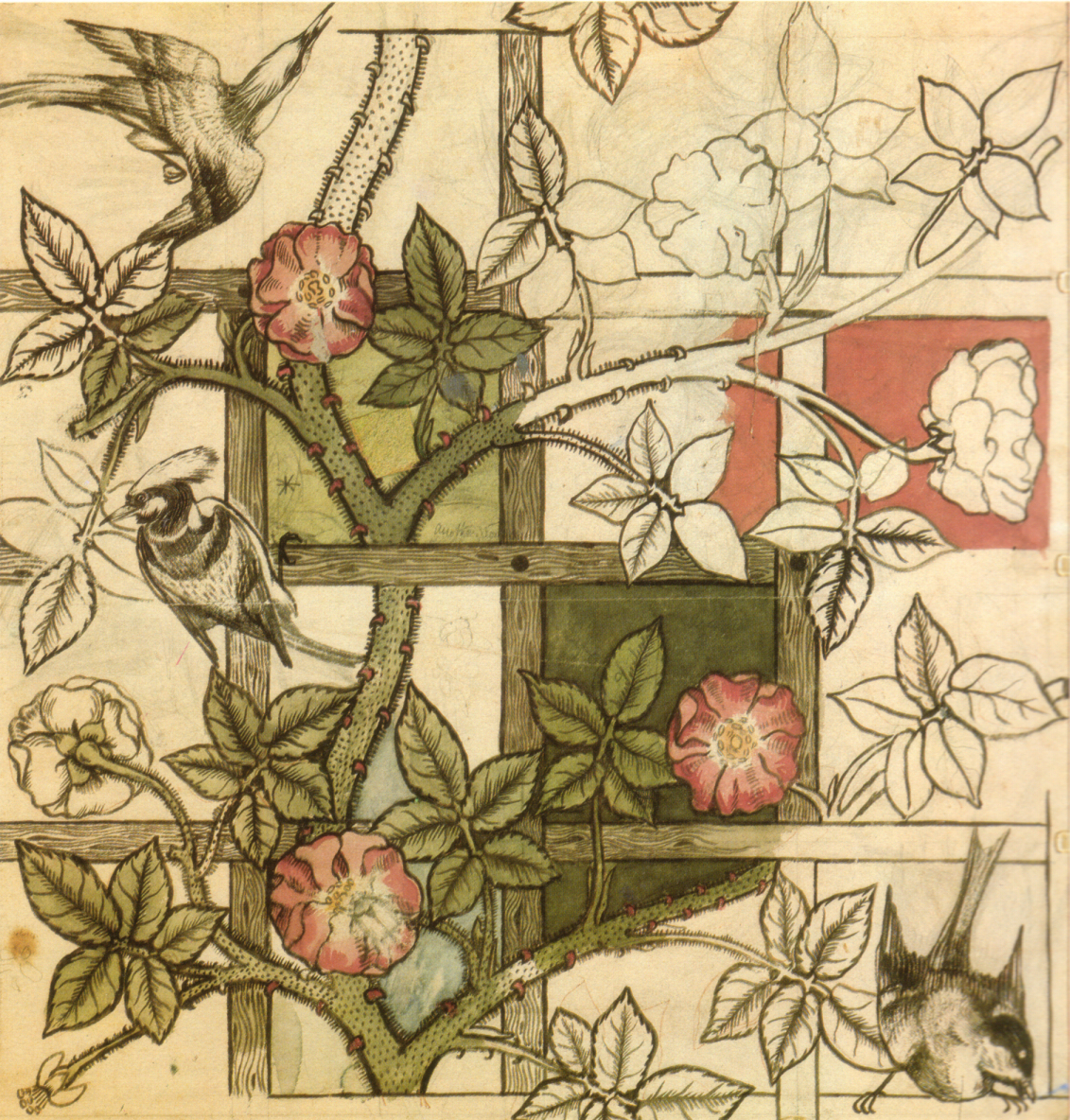
Design for Trellis wallpaper, 1862

Morris was slowly abandoning lithography and painting, recognising that his work lacked a sense of movement; none of his paintings are dated later than 1862. Instead he focused his energies on designing wallpaper patterns, the first being "Trellis", designed in 1862. His designs were produced from 1864 by Jeffrey and Co. of Islington, who created them for the Firm under Morris's supervision. Morris retained an active interest in various groups, joining the Hogarth Club, the Mediaeval Society, and the Corps of Artist Volunteers, the latter in contrast to his later pacifism.

Meanwhile, Morris's family continued to grow. In January 1861, Morris and Janey's first daughter was born: named Jane Alice Morris, she was commonly known as "Jenny". Jenny was followed in March 1862 by the birth of their second daughter, Mary "May" Morris. Morris was a caring father to his daughters, and years later they both recounted having idyllic childhoods. However, there were problems in Morris's marriage as Janey became increasingly close to Rossetti, who often painted her. It is unknown if their affair was ever sexual, although by this point other members of the group were noticing Rossetti and Janey's closeness.

Imagining the creation of an artistic community at Upton, Morris helped develop plans for a second house to be constructed adjacent to Red House in which Burne-Jones could live with his family; the plans were abandoned when Burne-Jones's son Christopher died from scarlet fever. By 1864, Morris had become increasingly tired of life at Red House, being particularly unhappy with the 3 to 4 hours spent commuting to his London workplace on a daily basis. He sold Red House, and in autumn 1865 moved with his family to No. 26 Queen Square in Bloomsbury, the same building to which the Firm had moved its base of operations earlier in the summer.

=== Queen Square and The Earthly Paradise: 1865–1870 ===
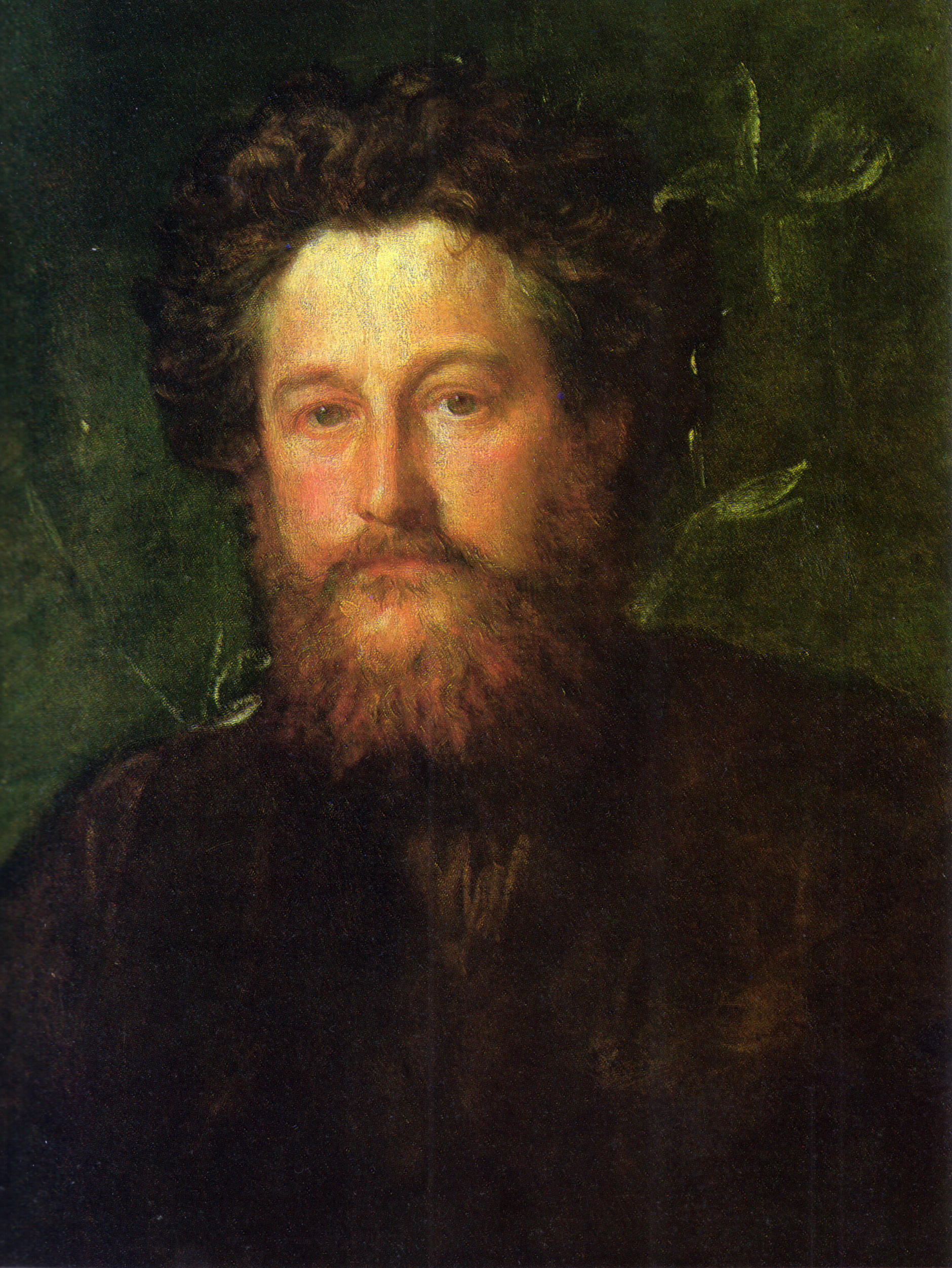
Portrait of William Morris by George Frederic Watts, 1870

At Queen Square, the Morris family lived in a flat directly above the Firm's shop. They were joined by Janey's sister Elizabeth Burden and a number of household servants. Meanwhile, changes were afoot at the Firm as Faulkner left, and to replace him they employed a business manager, Warrington Taylor, who would remain with them till 1866. Taylor pulled the Firm's finances into order and spent much time controlling Morris and ensuring that he worked to schedule. During these years the Firm carried out a number of high-profile designs; from September 1866 to January 1867, they redecorated the Armoury and Tapestry Room in St James's Palace, in the latter year also designing the Green Dining Room at the South Kensington Museum (it is now the Morris Room at the Victoria and Albert Museum). The Firm's work received increasing interest from people in the United States, resulting in Morris's acquaintance with Henry James and Charles Eliot Norton. However, despite its success, the Firm was not turning over a large net profit, and this, coupled with the decreasing value of Morris's stocks, meant that he had to decrease his spending.

Janey's relationship with Rossetti had continued, and by the late 1860s gossip regarding their affair had spread about London, where they were regularly seen spending time together. Morris biographer Fiona MacCarthy argued that it was likely that Morris had learned of and accepted the existence of their affair by 1870. In this year he developed an affectionate friendship with Aglaia Coronio, the daughter of wealthy Greek refugees, although there is no evidence that they had an affair. Meanwhile, Morris's relationship with his mother had improved, and he would regularly take his wife and children to visit her at her house in Leyton. He also went on various holidays; in the summer of 1866 he, Webb, and Taylor toured the churches of northern France.

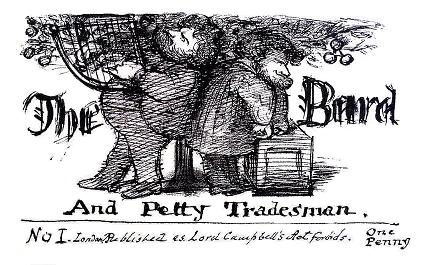
A caricature sketch of Morris by Rossetti, The Bard and Petty Tradesman, reflecting his behaviour at the Firm

In August 1866 Morris joined the Burne-Jones family on their holiday in Lymington, while in August 1867 both families holidayed together in Oxford. In August 1867 the Morrises holidayed in Southwold, Suffolk, while in the summer of 1869 Morris took his wife to Bad Ems in Rhineland-Palatinate, central Germany, where it was hoped that the local health waters would aid her ailments. While there, he enjoyed walks in the countryside and focused on writing poetry.

Morris had continued to devote much time to writing poetry. In 1867 Bell and Dandy published Morris's epic poem, The Life and Death of Jason, at his own expense. The book was a retelling of the ancient Greek myth of the hero Jason and his quest to find the Golden Fleece. In contrast to Morris's former publication, The Life and Death of Jason was well received, resulting in the publishers paying Morris a fee for the second edition. From 1865 to 1870, Morris worked on another epic poem, The Earthly Paradise. Designed as a homage to Chaucer, it consisted of 24 stories, adopted from an array of different cultures, and each by a different narrator; set in the late 14th century, the synopsis revolved around a group of Norsemen who flee the Black Death by sailing away from Europe, on the way discovering an island where the inhabitants continue to venerate the ancient Greek gods. Published in four parts by F. S. Ellis, it soon gained a cult following and established Morris's reputation as a major poet.

=== Kelmscott Manor and Iceland: 1870–1875 ===
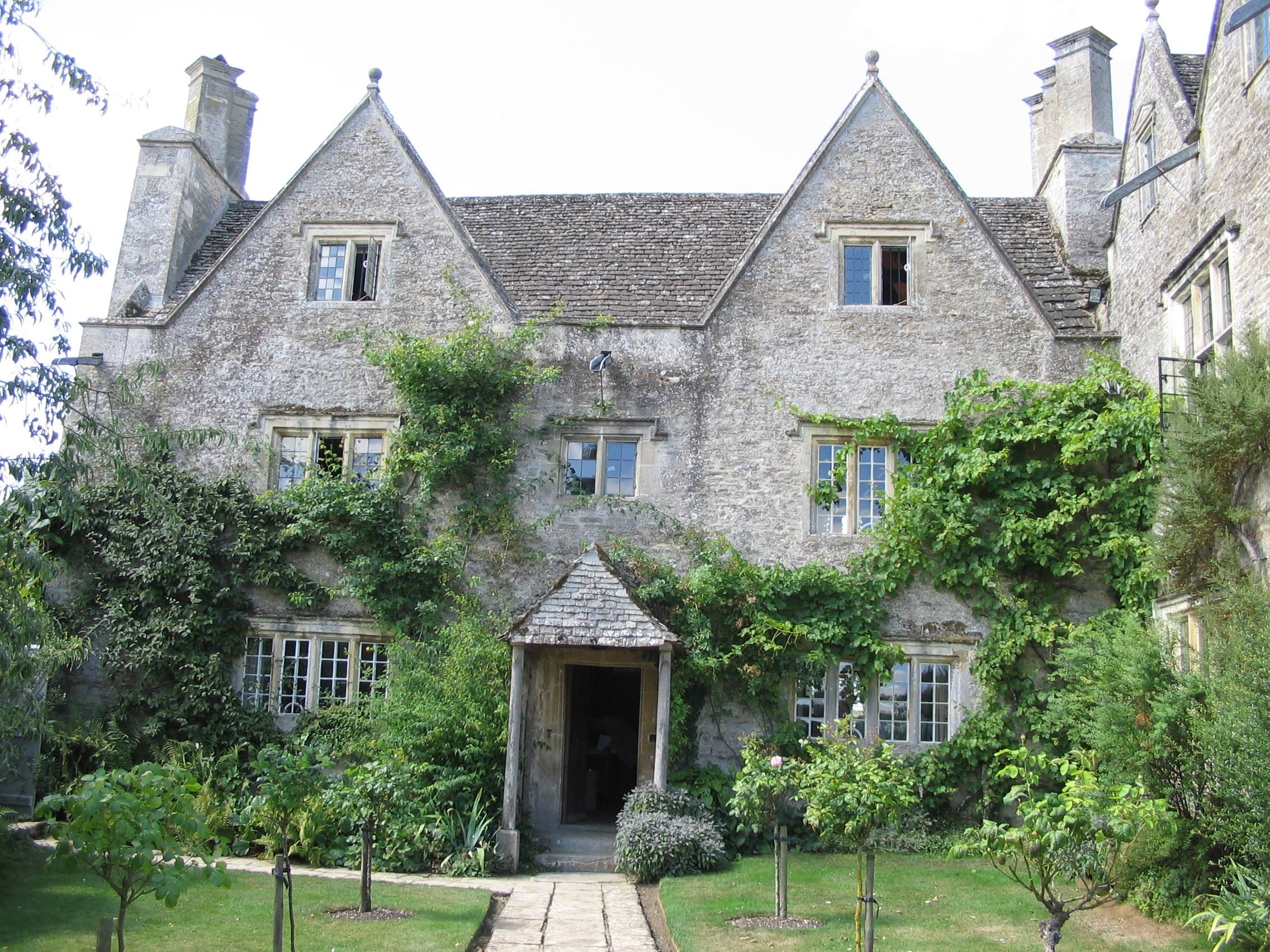
Main entrance to Kelmscott Manor

By 1870, Morris had become a public figure in Britain, resulting in repeated press requests for photographs, which he despised. That year, he also reluctantly agreed to sit for a portrait by establishment painter George Frederic Watts. Morris was keenly interested in Icelandic literature, having befriended the Icelandic theologian Eiríkur Magnússon. Together they produced prose translations of the Eddas and Sagas for publication in English. In 1870 Morris began collecting and researching art from the Islamic world. Morris also developed a keen interest in creating handwritten illuminated manuscripts, producing 18 such books between 1870 and 1875, the first of which was A Book of Verse, completed as a birthday present for Georgina Burne-Jones. 12 of these 18 were handwritten copies of Nordic tales such as Halfdan the Black, Frithiof the Bold, and The Dwellers of Eyr. Morris deemed calligraphy to be an art form, and taught himself both Roman and italic script, as well as learning how to produce gilded letters. In November 1872 he published Love is Enough, a poetic drama based on the story The Dream of Macsen Wledig in the Medieval Welsh text, the Mabinogion. Illustrated with Burne-Jones woodcuts, it was not a popular success. By 1871, he had begun work on a novel set in the present, The Novel on Blue Paper, which was about a love triangle; it would remain unfinished and Morris later asserted that it was not well written.

By early summer 1871, Morris began to search for a house outside London where his children could spend time away from the city's pollution. He settled on Kelmscott Manor in the village of Kelmscott, Oxfordshire, obtaining a joint tenancy on the building with Rossetti in June. Morris adored the building, which was constructed circa 1570, and would spend much time in the local countryside. In contrast, Rossetti was unhappy at Kelmscott, and eventually suffered a mental breakdown. Morris divided his time between London and Kelmscott; however, when Rossetti was there he would not spend more than three days at a time at the latter. He became fed up with his family home in Queen Square, deciding to obtain a new house in London. Although retaining a personal bedroom and study at Queen Square, he relocated his family to Horrington House in Turnham Green Road, West London, in January 1873. This allowed him to be far closer to the home of Burne-Jones, with the duo meeting on almost every Sunday morning for the rest of Morris's life.

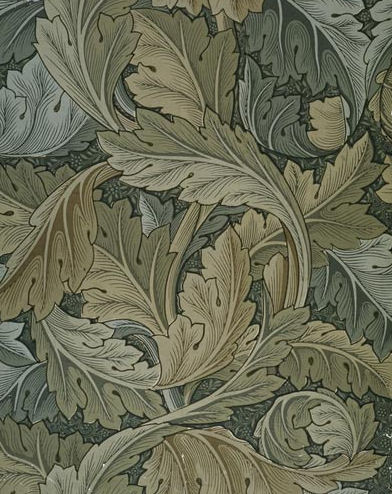
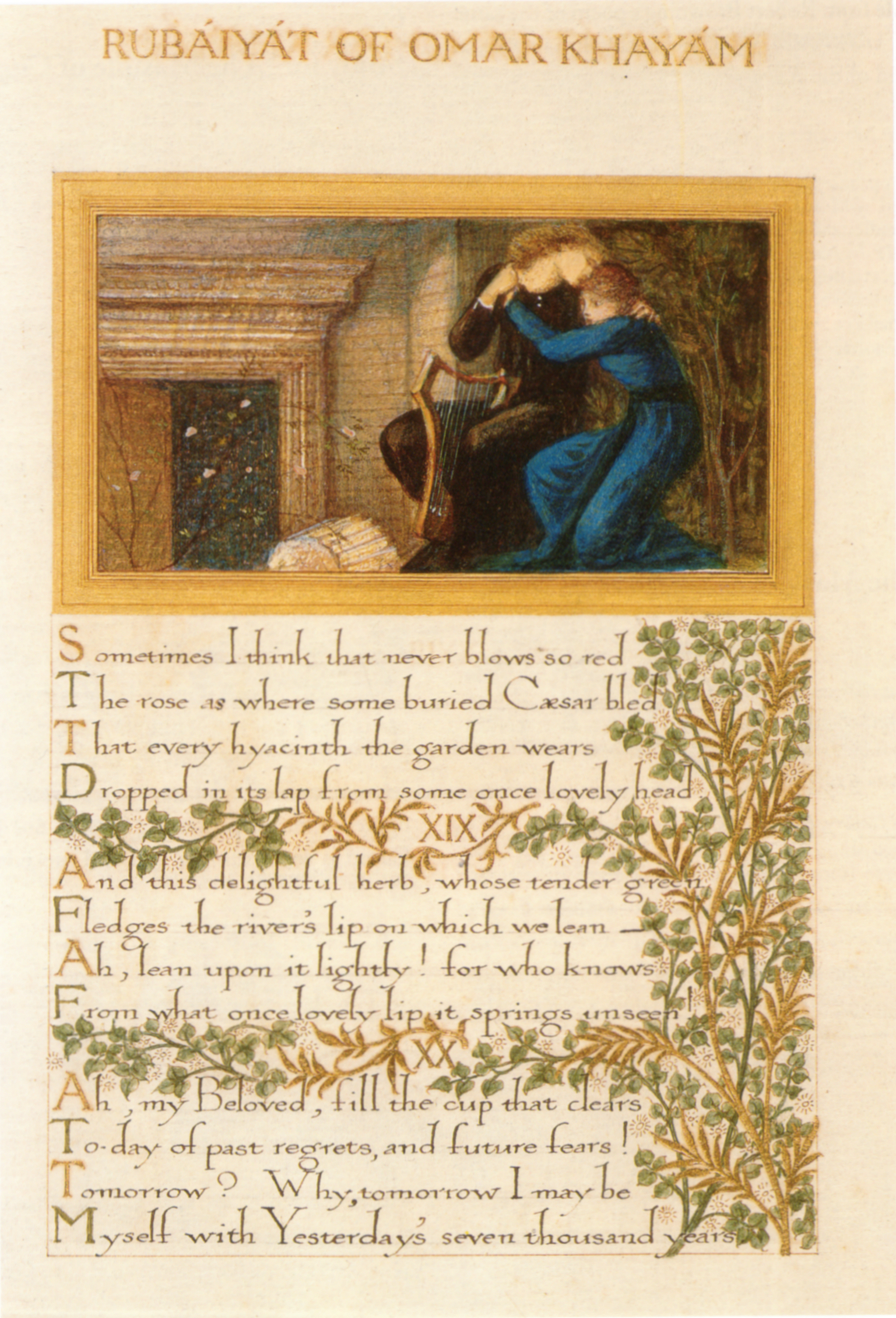
Morris's Acanthus wallpaper design, (1875, left) and a page from Morris's illuminated manuscript of the Rubaiyat of Omar Khayyam, illustrated by Edward Burne-Jones

Leaving Jane and his children with Rossetti at Kelmscott, in July 1871 Morris left for Iceland with Faulkner, W. H. Evans, and Eiríkur. Sailing from the Scottish port of Granton aboard a Danish mail boat, they proceeded to the island via Tórshavn in the Faroe Islands before arriving at Reykjavík, where they disembarked. There they met the President of the Althing, Jón Sigurðsson, with Morris being sympathetic to the Icelandic independence movement. From there, they proceeded by Icelandic horse along the south coast to Bergþórshvoll, Þórsmörk, Geysir, Þingvellir, and then back to Reykjavík, where they departed back to Britain in September. In April 1873, Morris and Burne-Jones holidayed in Italy, visiting Florence and Siena. Although generally disliking the country, Morris was interested in the Florentine Gothic architecture. Soon after, in July, Morris returned to Iceland, revisiting many of the sites he had previously seen, but then proceeding north to Vatna glacier and Fljótsdalur. His two visits to the country profoundly influenced him, in particular in his growing leftist opinions; he would comment that these trips made him realise that "the most grinding poverty is a trifling evil compared with the inequality of classes."

Morris and Burne-Jones then spent time with one of the Firm's patrons, the wealthy George Howard, 9th Earl of Carlisle and his wife Rosalind, at their medieval home in Naworth Castle, Cumberland. In July 1874, the Morris family then took Burne-Jones's two children with them on their holiday to Bruges, Belgium. However, by this point Morris's friendship with Rossetti had seriously eroded, and in July 1874 their acrimonious falling out led Rossetti to leave Kelmscott, with Morris's publisher F.S. Ellis taking his place. With the company's other partners drifting off to work on other projects, Morris decided to consolidate his own control of the Firm and become sole proprietor and manager. In March 1875, he paid £1000 each in compensation to Rossetti, Brown, and Marshall, although the other partners waived their claims to financial compensation. That month, the Firm was officially disbanded and replaced by Morris & Co, although Burne-Jones and Webb would continue to produce designs for it in future. This accomplished, he resigned his directorship of the Devon Great Consols, selling his remaining shares in the company.

=== Textile experimentation and political embrace: 1875–1880 ===
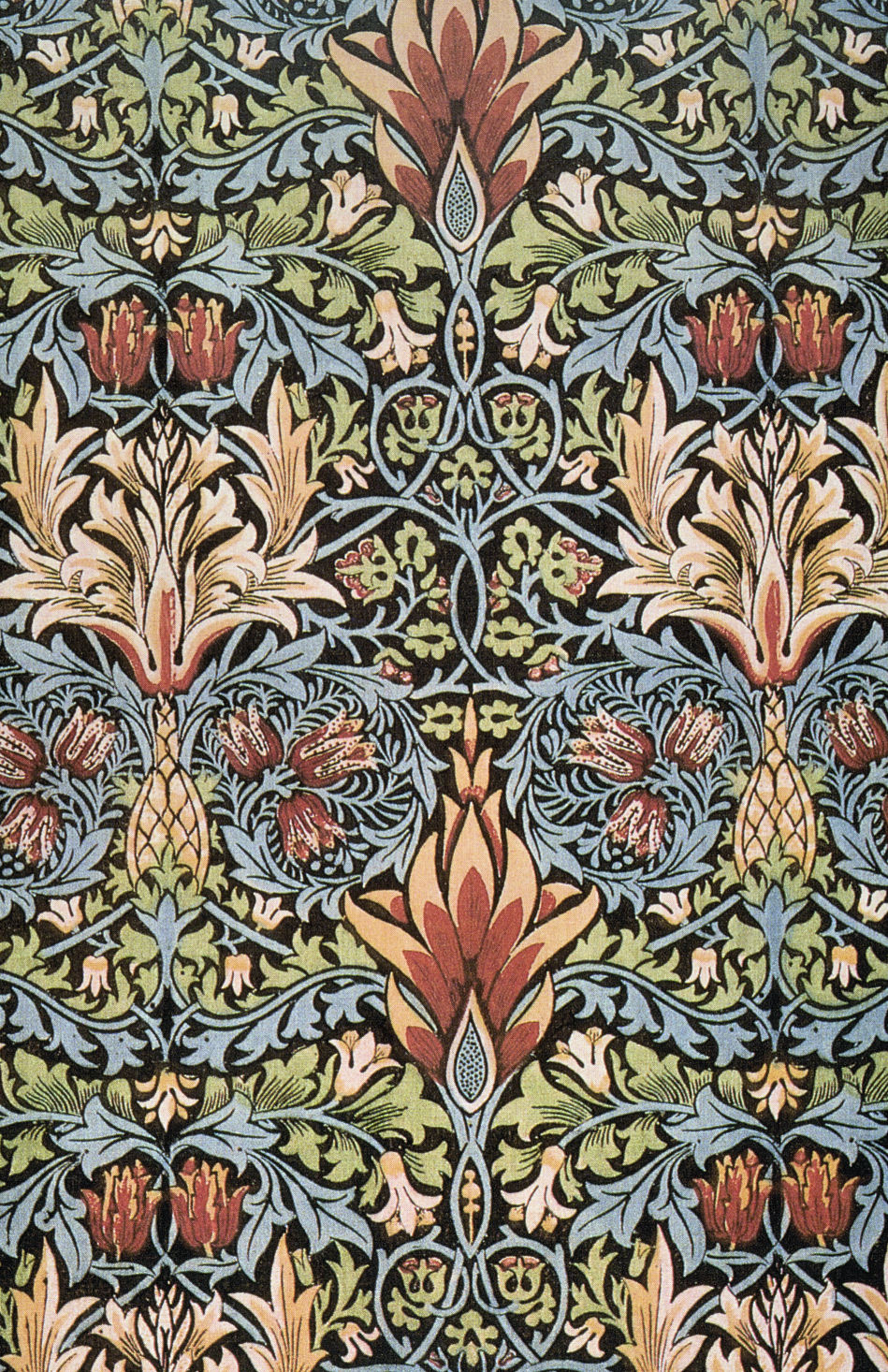
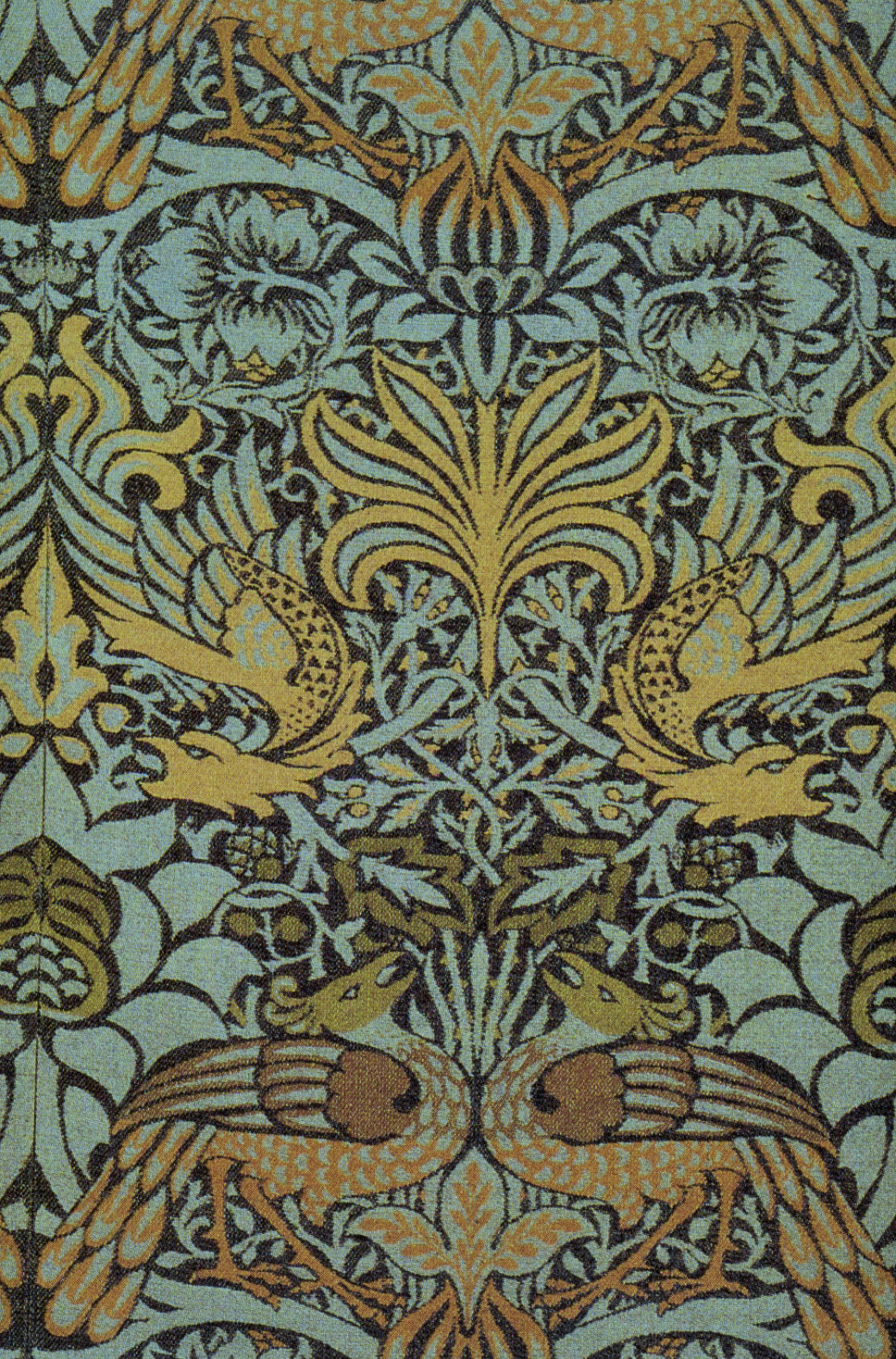
Two of Morris's designs: Snakeshead printed textile (1876) and "Peacock and Dragon" woven wool furnishing fabric (1878)

Now in complete control of the Firm, Morris took an increased interest in the process of textile dyeing and entered into a co-operative agreement with Thomas Wardle, a silk dyer who operated the Hencroft Works in Leek, Staffordshire. As a result, Morris would spend time with Wardle at his home on various occasions between summer 1875 and spring 1878. Deeming the colours to be of inferior quality, Morris rejected the chemical aniline dyes which were then predominant, instead emphasising the revival of organic dyes, such as indigo for blue, walnut shells and roots for brown, and cochineal, kermes, and madder for red. Living and working in this industrial environment, he gained a personal understanding of production and the lives of the proletariat, and was disgusted by the poor living conditions of workers and the pollution caused by industry; these factors greatly influenced his political views. After learning the skills of dyeing, in the late 1870s Morris turned his attention to weaving, experimenting with silk weaving at Queen's Square.

In the spring of 1877, the Firm opened a store at No. 449 Oxford Street and obtained new staff who were able to improve its professionalism; as a result, sales increased and its popularity grew. By 1880, Morris & Co. had become a household name, having become very popular with Britain's upper and middle classes. The Firm was obtaining increasing numbers of commissions from aristocrats, wealthy industrialists, and provincial entrepreneurs, with Morris furnishing parts of St James's Palace and the chapel at Eaton Hall. As a result of his growing sympathy for the working-classes and poor, Morris felt personally conflicted in serving the interests of these individuals, privately describing it as "ministering to the swinish luxury of the rich".

Continuing with his literary output, Morris translated his own version of Virgil's Aeneid, titling it The Aeneids of Vergil (1876). Although many translations were already available, often produced by trained classicists, Morris claimed that his unique perspective was as "a poet not a pedant". He also continued producing translations of Icelandic tales with Magnússon, including Three Northern Love Stories (1875) and Völuspa Saga (1876). In 1877 Morris was approached by Oxford University and offered the largely honorary position of Professor of Poetry. He declined, asserting that he felt unqualified, knowing little about scholarship on the theory of poetry.

In summer 1876, Jenny Morris was diagnosed with epilepsy. Refusing to allow her to be societally marginalized or institutionalized, as was common in the period, Morris insisted that she be cared for by the family. When Janey took May and Jenny to Oneglia in Italy, the latter suffered a serious seizure, with Morris rushing to the country to see her. They then proceeded to visit a number of other cities, including Venice, Padua, and Verona, with Morris attaining a greater appreciation of the country than he had on his previous trip. In April 1879 Morris moved the family home again, this time renting an 18th-century mansion on Hammersmith's Upper Mall in West London that was owned by the novelist George MacDonald. Morris named it Kelmscott House and re-decorated it according to his own taste. In the House's grounds he set up a workshop, focusing on the production of hand-knotted carpets. Excited that both of his homes were along the course of the River Thames, in August 1880 he and his family took a boat trip along the river from Kelmscott House to Kelmscott Manor.

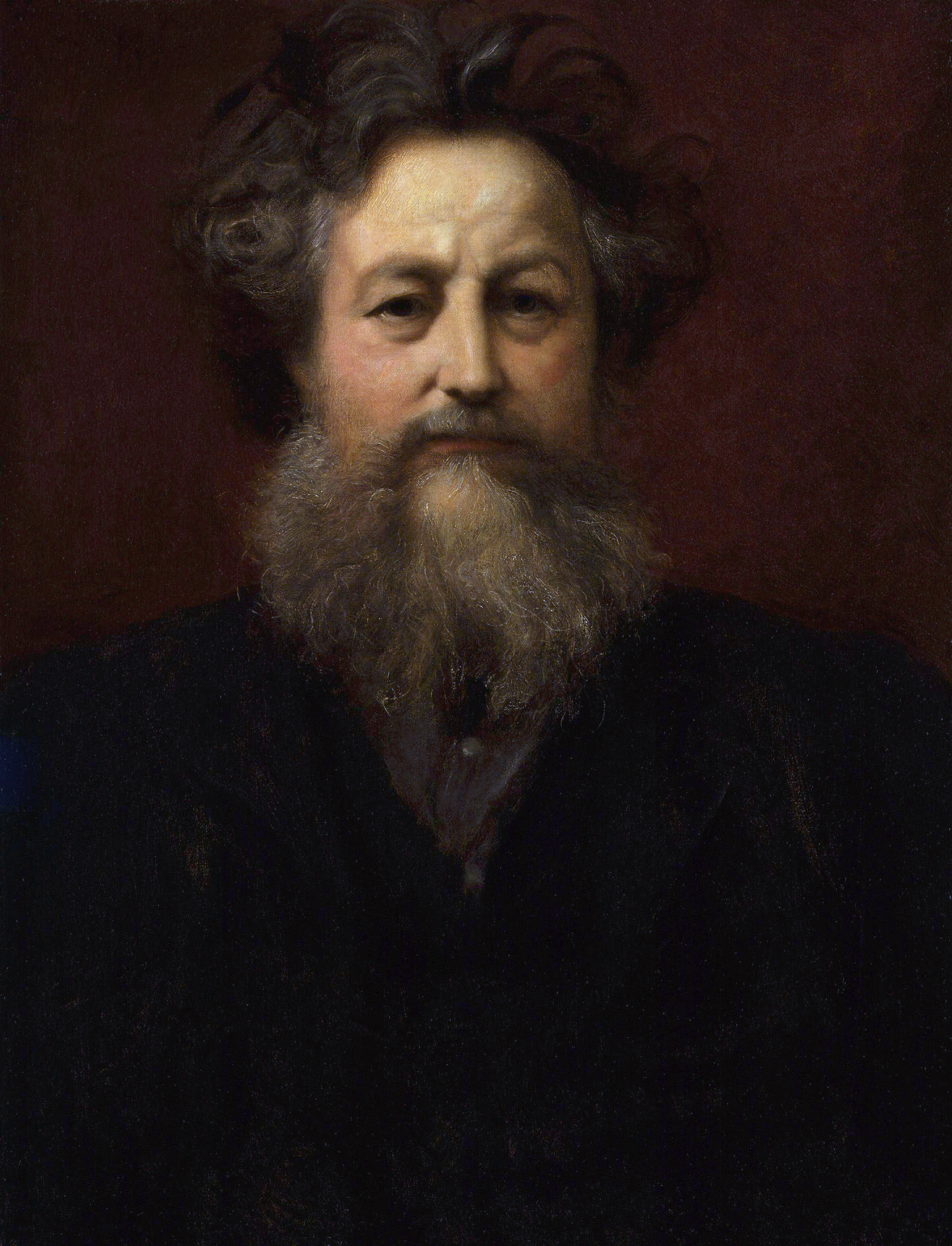
Portrait of William Morris by William Blake Richmond

Morris became politically active in this period, coming to be associated with the radicalist current within British liberalism. He joined the Eastern Question Association (EQA) and was appointed the group's treasurer in November 1876. EQA had been founded by campaigners associated with the centre-left Liberal Party who opposed Prime Minister Benjamin Disraeli's alliance with the Ottoman Empire; the Association highlighted the Ottoman massacre of Bulgarians and feared that the alliance would lead Disraeli to join the Ottomans in going to war with the Russian Empire. Morris took an active role in the EQA campaign, authoring the lyrics for the song "Wake, London Lads!" to be sung at a rally against military intervention. Morris eventually became disillusioned with the EQA, describing it as being "full of wretched little personalities". He nevertheless joined a regrouping of predominantly working-class EQA activists, the National Liberal League, becoming their treasurer in summer 1879; the group remained small and politically ineffective, with Morris resigning as treasurer in late 1881, shortly before the group's collapse.

However, his discontent with the British liberal movement grew following the election of the Liberal Party's William Ewart Gladstone to the Premiership in 1880. Morris was particularly angered that Gladstone's government did not reverse the Disraeli regime's occupation of the Transvaal, introduced the Coercion Bill, and oversaw the Bombardment of Alexandria. Morris later related that while he had once believed that "one might further real Socialistic progress by doing what one could on the lines of ordinary middle-class Radicalism", following Gladstone's election he came to realise "that Radicalism is on the wrong line, so to say, and will never develope [sic] into anything more than Radicalism: in fact that it is made for and by the middle classes and will always be under the control of rich capitalists".

In 1876, Morris visited the Church of St John the Baptist, Burford, where he was appalled at the restoration conducted by his old mentor, G. E. Street. He recognised that these programs of architectural restoration led to the destruction or major alteration of genuinely old features in order to replace them with "sham old" features, something which appalled him. To combat the increasing trend for restoration, in March 1877 he founded the Society for the Protection of Ancient Buildings (SPAB), which he personally referred to as "Anti-Scrape". As he adopted the role of honorary secretary and treasurer, most of the other early members of SPAB were his friends, while the group's program was rooted in Ruskin's The Seven Lamps of Architecture (1849). As part of SPAB's campaign, Morris tried to build connections with art and antiquarian societies and the custodians of old buildings, and also contacted the press to highlight his cause. He was particularly strong in denouncing the ongoing restoration of Tewkesbury Abbey and was vociferous in denouncing the architects responsible, something that deeply upset Street. Turning SPAB's attention abroad, in autumn 1879 Morris launched a campaign to protect St Mark's Basilica in Venice from restoration, garnering a petition with 2000 signatures, among whom were Disraeli, Gladstone, and Ruskin.

== Later life ==
=== Merton Abbey and the Social Democratic Federation: 1881–1884 ===
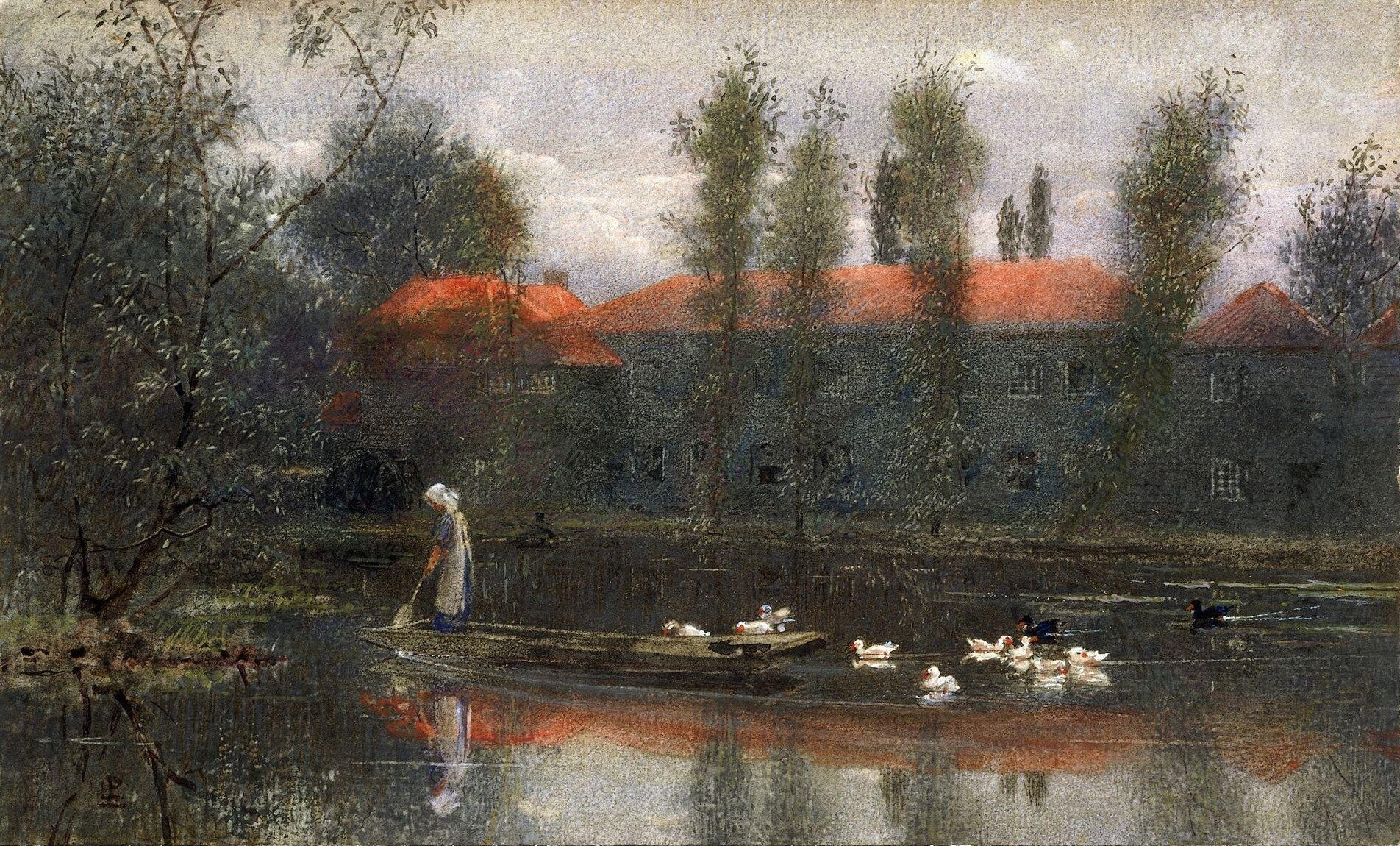
The Pond at Merton Abbey by Lexden Lewis Pocock is an idyllic representation of the works in the time of Morris.

In summer 1881, Morris took out a lease on the seven-acre former silk weaving factory, the Merton Abbey Works, next to the River Wandle on the High Street at Merton, Southwest London (not to be confused with the adjacent Merton Abbey Mills, home of the Liberty Print Works.) After he moved his workshops to the site, the premises were used for weaving, dyeing, and creating stained glass; within three years, 100 craftsmen were employed there. Working conditions at the Abbey were better than at most Victorian factories. However, despite Morris's ideals, there was little opportunity for the workers to display their own individual creativity. Morris had initiated a system of profit sharing among the Firm's upper clerks, however this did not include the majority of workers, who were instead employed on a piecework basis. Morris was aware that, in retaining the division between employer and employed, the company failed to live up to his own egalitarian ideals, but he defended this, asserting that it was impossible to run a socialist company within a competitive capitalist economy. The Firm itself was expanding, opening up a store in Manchester in 1883 and holding a stand at that year's Foreign Fair in Boston.

Janey's relationship with Rossetti had continued through a correspondence and occasional visits, although she found him extremely paranoid and was upset by his addiction to chloral. She last saw him in 1881, and he died in April the following year. Morris described his mixed feelings toward his deceased friend by stating that he had "some of the very greatest qualities of genius, most of them indeed; what a great man he would have been but for the arrogant misanthropy which marred his work, and killed him before his time". In August 1883, Janey was introduced to the poet Wilfrid Scawen Blunt, with whom she embarked on a second affair, which Morris might have been aware of.

In January 1881, Morris was involved in the establishment of the Radical Union, an amalgam of radical working-class groups which hoped to rival the Liberals, and became a member of its executive committee. However, he soon rejected liberal radicalism completely and moved toward socialism. In this period, British socialism was a small, fledgling and vaguely defined movement, with only a few hundred adherents. Britain's first socialist party, the Democratic Federation (DF), had been founded in 1881 by Henry Hyndman, an adherent of the socio-political ideology of Marxism, with Morris joining the DF in January 1883. Morris began to read voraciously on the subject of socialism, including Henry George's Progress and Poverty, Alfred Russel Wallace's Land Nationalisation, and Karl Marx's Das Kapital, although admitted that Marx's economic analysis of capitalism gave him "agonies of confusion on the brain". Instead he preferred the writings of William Cobbett and Sergius Stepniak, although he also read the critique of socialism produced by John Stuart Mill.

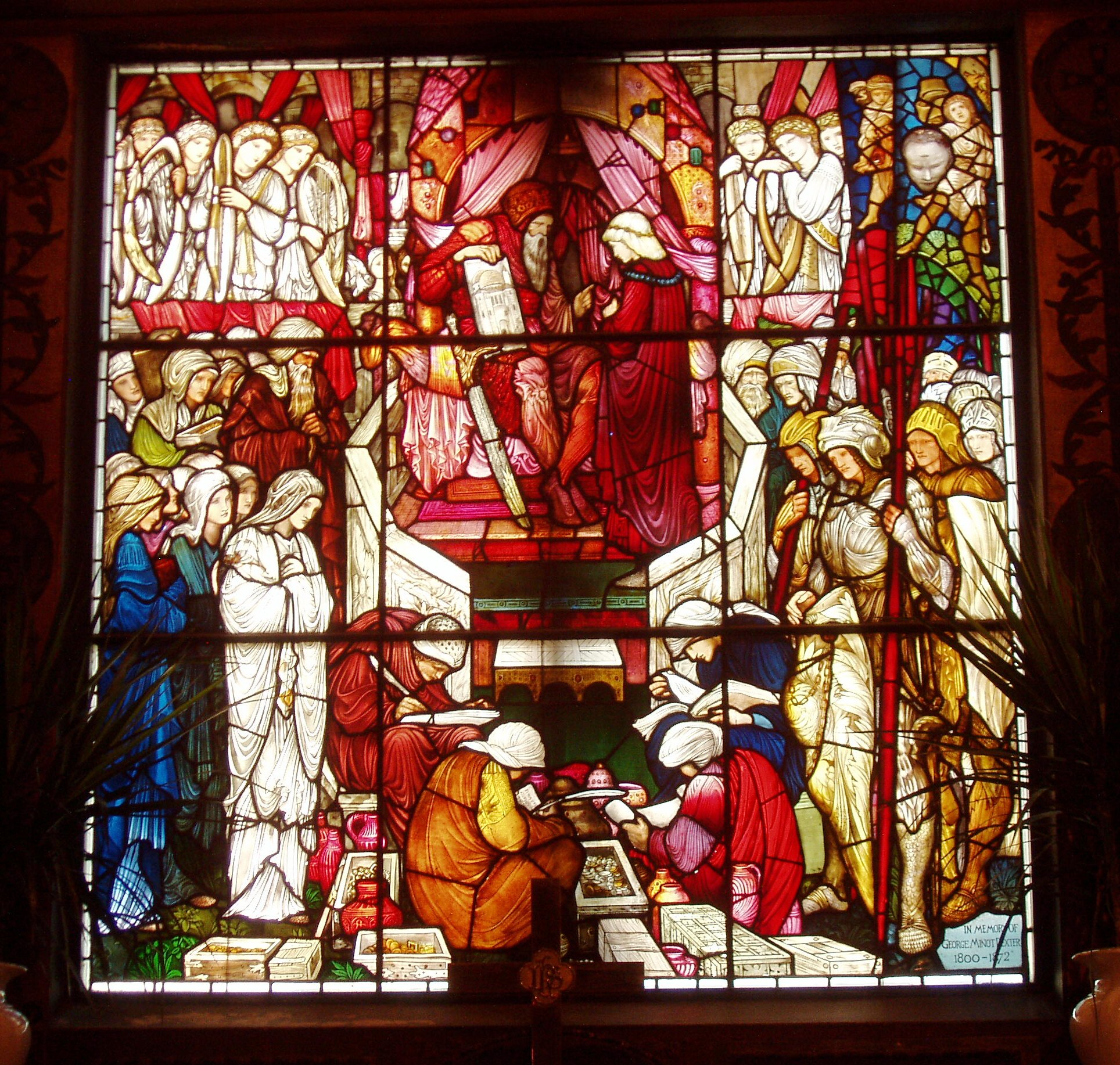
David's Charge to Solomon (1882), a stained-glass window by Edward Burne-Jones and William Morris in Trinity Church, Boston, Massachusetts

In May 1883, Morris was appointed to the DF's executive committee, and was soon elected to the position of treasurer. Devoting himself to the socialist cause, he regularly lectured at meetings across Britain, hoping to gain more converts, although was regularly criticised for doing so by the mainstream press. In November 1883 he was invited to speak at University College, Oxford, on the subject of "Democracy and Art" and there began espousing socialism; this shocked and embarrassed many members of staff, earning national press coverage. With other DF members, he travelled to Blackburn, Lancashire in February 1884 amid the great cotton strike, where he lectured on socialism to the strikers. The following month he marched in a central London demonstration commemorating the first anniversary of Marx's death and the thirteenth anniversary of the Paris Commune.

Morris aided the DF using his artistic and literary talents; he designed the group's membership card, and helped author their manifesto, Socialism Made Plain, in which they demanded improved housing for workers, free compulsory education for all children, free school meals, an eight-hour working day, the abolition of national debt, nationalisation of land, banks, and railways, and the organisation of agriculture and industry under state control and co-operative principles. Some of his DF comrades found it difficult to reconcile his socialist values with his position as proprietor of the Firm, although he was widely admired as a man of integrity. The DF began publishing a weekly newspaper, Justice, which soon faced financial losses that Morris covered. Morris also regularly contributed articles to the newspaper, in doing so befriending another contributor, George Bernard Shaw.

His socialist activism monopolised his time, forcing him to abandon a translation of the Persian Shahnameh. It also led to him seeing far less of Burne-Jones, with whom he had strong political differences; although once a republican, Burne-Jones had become increasingly conservative, and felt that the DF were exploiting Morris for his talents and influence. While Morris devoted much time to trying to convert his friends to the cause, of Morris's circle of artistic comrades, only Webb and Faulkner fully embraced socialism, while Swinburne expressed his sympathy with it.

In 1884, the DF renamed itself the Social Democratic Federation (SDF) and underwent an internal reorganisation. However, the group was facing an internal schism between those (such as Hyndman), who argued for a parliamentary path toward socialism, and those (like Morris) who deemed the Houses of Parliament intrinsically corrupt and capitalist. Personal issues between Morris and Hyndman were exacerbated by their attitude to British foreign policy; Morris was staunchly anti-imperialist while Hyndman expressed patriotic sentiment encouraging some foreign intervention. The division between the two groups developed into open conflict, with the majority of members sharing Morris's position. In December 1884 Morris and his supporters – most notably Ernest Belfort Bax and Edward Aveling – left the SDF; the first major schism of the British socialist movement.

=== Socialist League: 1884–1889 ===
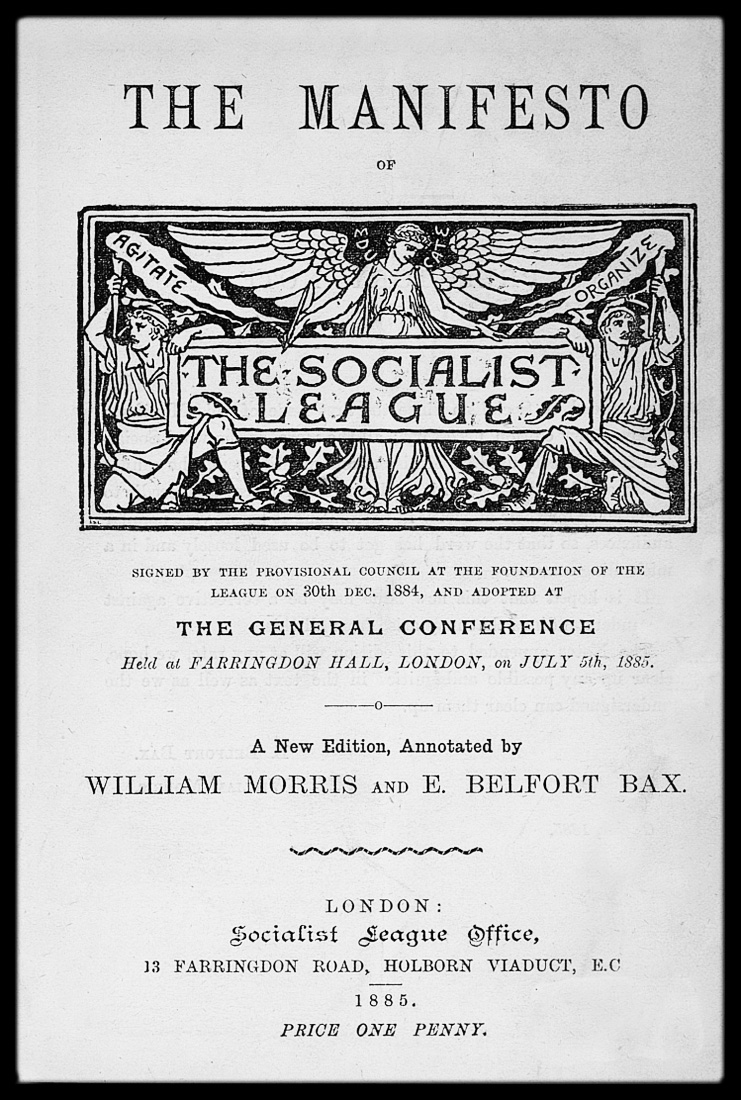
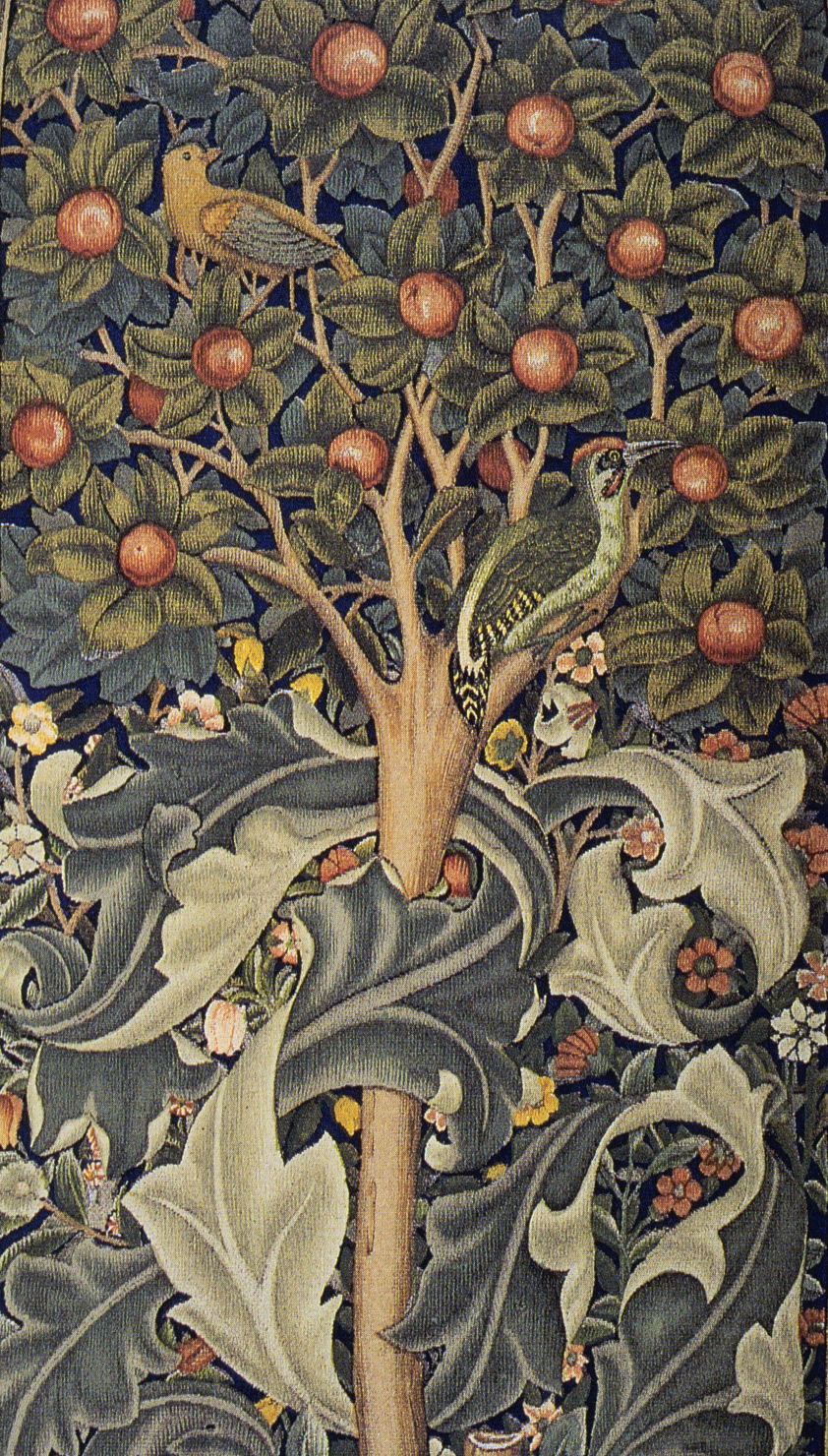
Left: the cover of the Socialist League's manifesto of 1885 featured art by Morris. Right: detail of Woodpecker tapestry, 1885.

In December 1884, Morris founded the Socialist League (SL) with other SDF defectors. He composed the SL's manifesto with Bax, describing their position as that of "Revolutionary International Socialism", advocating proletarian internationalism and world revolution while rejecting the concept of socialism in one country. In this, he committed himself to "making Socialists" by educating, organising, and agitating to establish a strong socialist movement; calling on activists to boycott elections, he hoped that socialists would take part in a proletariat revolution and help to establish a socialist society. Bax taught Morris more about Marxism, and introduced him to Marx's collaborator, Friedrich Engels; Engels thought Morris honest but lacking in practical skills to aid the proletarian revolution. Morris remained in contact with other sectors of London's leftist community, being a regular at the socialist International Club in Shoreditch, East London, however he avoided the recently created Fabian Society, deeming it too middle-class. Although a Marxist, he befriended prominent anarchist activists Stepniak and Peter Kropotkin, and came to be influenced by their anarchist views, to the extent that biographer Fiona MacCarthy described his approach as being "Marxism with visionary libertarianism".

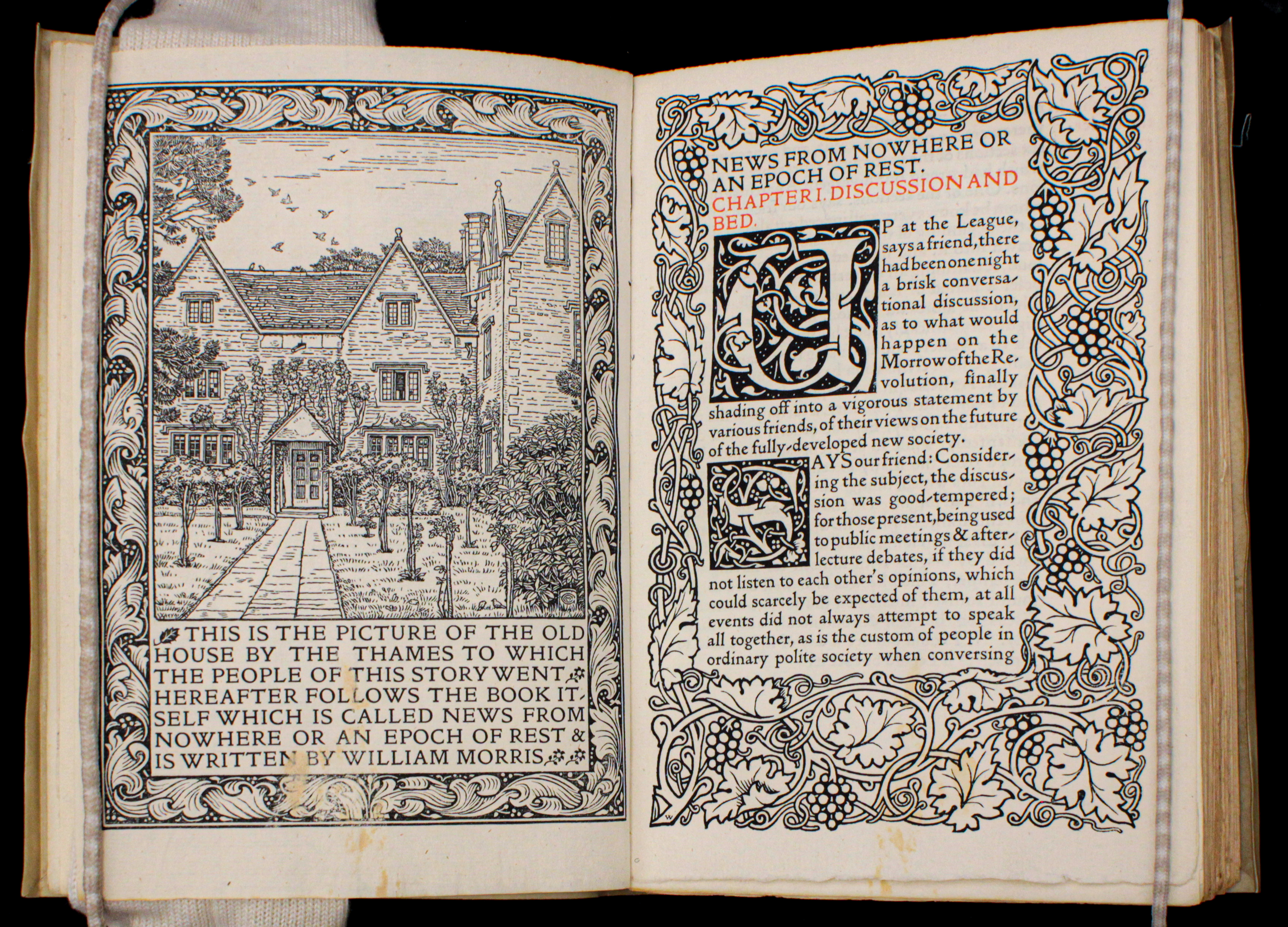
William Morris, News from Nowhere: Or, an Epoch of Rest (London: Kelmscott Press, 1892); Pequot Library Special Collections

As the leading figure in the League, Morris embarked on a series of speeches and talks on street corners, in working men's clubs, and in lecture theatres across England and Scotland. He also visited Dublin, there offering his support for Irish nationalism, and formed a branch of the League at his Hammersmith house. By the time of their first conference in July 1885, the League had eight branches across England and had affiliations with several socialist groups in Scotland. However, as the British socialist movement grew it faced increased opposition from the establishment, with police frequently arresting and intimidating activists. To combat this, the League joined a Defence Club with other socialist groups, including the SDF, for which Morris was appointed treasurer. Morris was passionate in denouncing the "bullying and hectoring" that he felt socialists faced from the police, and on one occasion was arrested himself after fighting back against a police officer; a magistrate dismissed the charges. The Black Monday riots of February 1886 led to increased political repression against left-wing agitators, and in July Morris was again arrested and fined for public obstruction while preaching socialism on the streets.

Morris oversaw production of the League's monthly—soon to become weekly—newspaper, Commonweal, serving as its editor for six years, during which time he kept it financially afloat. First published in February 1885, it would contain contributions from such prominent socialists as Engels, Shaw, Paul Lafargue, Wilhelm Liebknecht, and Karl Kautsky, with Morris also regularly writing articles and poems for it. In Commonweal he serialised a 13-episode poem, The Pilgrims of Hope, which was set in the period of the Paris Commune. From November 1886 to January 1887, Morris's novel A Dream of John Ball was serialised in Commonweal. Set in Kent during the Peasants' Revolt of 1381, it contained strong socialist themes, although it proved popular among those of different ideological viewpoints, resulting in its publication in book form by Reeves and Turner in 1888. Shortly after, a collection of Morris's essays, Signs of Change, was published.

Our business [...] is the making of Socialists, i.e. convincing people that Socialism is good for them and is possible. When we have enough people of that way of thinking, they will find out what action is necessary for putting their principles in practice. Therefore, I say, make Socialists. We Socialists can do nothing else that is useful."

— William Morris

From January to October 1890, Morris serialised his novel News from Nowhere in Commonweal, resulting in improved circulation for the paper. In March 1891 it was published in book form, before being translated into Dutch, French, Swedish, German and Italian by 1900 and becoming a classic among Europe's socialist community. Combining utopian socialism and soft science fiction, the book tells the tale of a contemporary socialist, William Guest, who falls asleep and awakens in the early 21st century, discovering a future society based on common ownership and democratic control of the means of production. In this society there is no private property, no big cities, no authority, no monetary system, no divorce, no courts, no prisons, and no class systems; it was a depiction of Morris's ideal socialist society.

Morris had also continued with his translation work; in April 1887, Reeves and Turner published the first volume of Morris's translation of Homer's Odyssey, with the second following in November. Venturing into new territory, Morris also authored and starred in a play The Tables Turned; Or Nupkins Awakened, which was performed at a League meeting in November 1887. It told the story of socialists who are put on trial in front of a corrupt judge; the tale ends with the prisoners being freed by a proletariat revolution. In June 1889, Morris travelled to Paris as the League's delegate to the International Socialist Working Men's Congress, where his international standing was recognised by his being chosen as English spokesman by the Congress committee. The Second International emerged from the Congress, although Morris was distraught at its chaotic and disorganised proceedings.

At the League's Fourth Conference in May 1888, factional divisions became increasingly apparent between Morris's anti-parliamentary socialists, the parliamentary socialists, and the anti-statist anarchists; the Bloomsbury Branch were expelled for supporting parliamentary action. Under the leadership of Charles Mowbray, the League's anarchist wing was growing and called on the League to embrace violent action in trying to overthrow the capitalist system. By autumn 1889 the anarchists had taken over the League's executive committee and Morris was stripped of the editorship of Commonweal in favour of the anarchist Frank Kitz. This alienated Morris from the League, which had also become a financial burden for him; he had been subsidising its activities with £500 a year, a very large sum of money at the time. By the autumn of 1890, Morris left the Socialist League, with his Hammersmith branch seceding to become the independent Hammersmith Socialist Society in November 1890.

=== The Kelmscott Press and Morris's final years: 1889–1896 ===
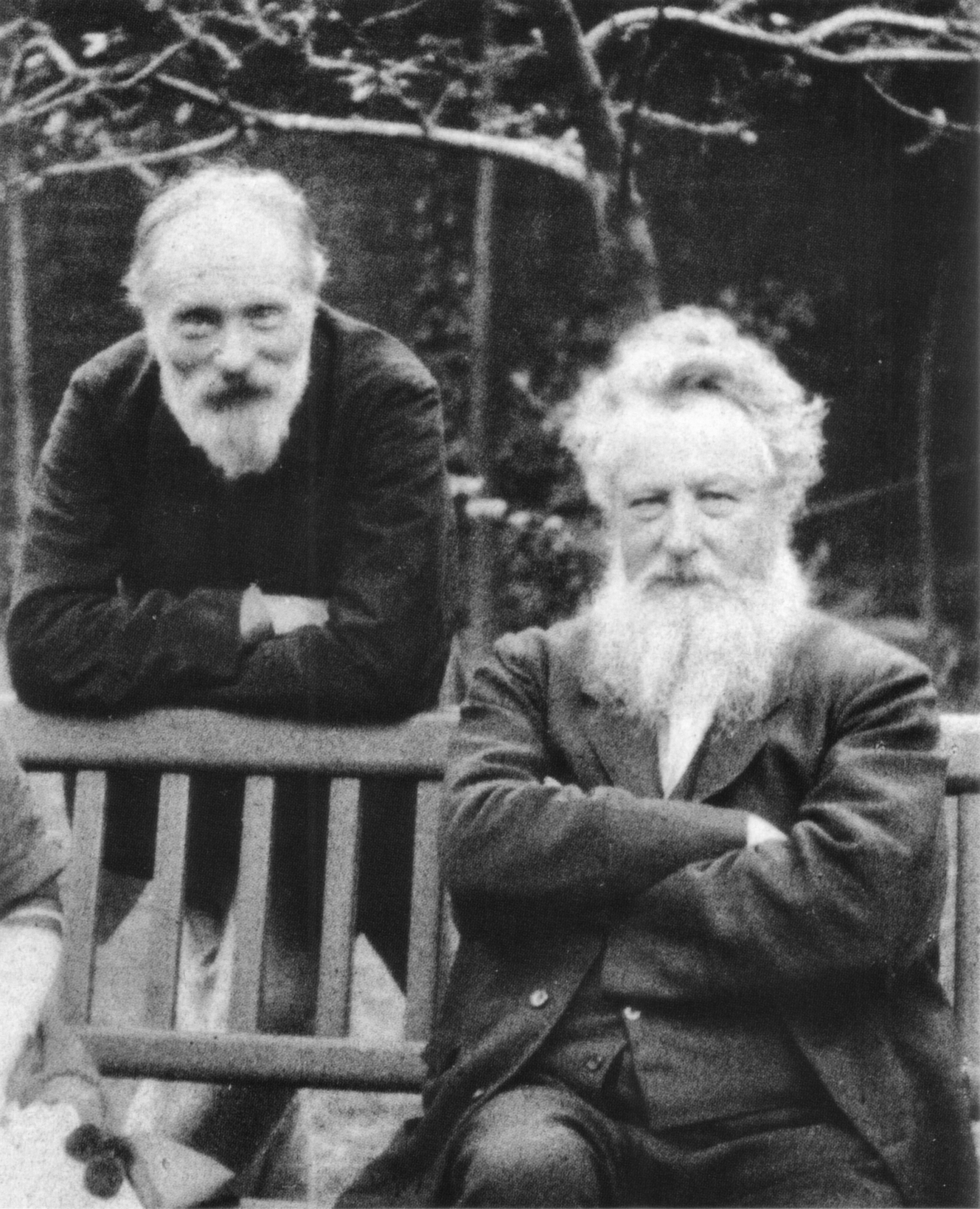
Morris (right) with Burne-Jones, 1890

The work of Morris & Co. continued during Morris's final years, producing an array of stained glass windows designed by Burne-Jones and the six narrative tapestry panels depicting the quest for the Holy Grail for Stanmore Hall, Shropshire. Morris's influence on Britain's artistic community became increasingly apparent as the Art Workers' Guild was founded in 1884, although at the time he was too preoccupied with his socialist activism to pay it any attention. Although the proposal faced some opposition, Morris was elected to the Guild in 1888, and to the position of master in 1892. Morris similarly did not offer initial support for the Arts and Crafts Exhibition Society, but changed his opinion after the success of their first exhibit, held in Regent Street in October 1888. Giving lectures on tapestries for the group, in 1892 he was elected president. At this time, Morris re-focused his attentions on preservation campaigning; those causes he championed including the structures of St Mary's Church in Oxford, Blythburgh Church in Suffolk, Peterborough Cathedral, and Rouen Cathedral.

Although his socialist activism had decreased, he remained involved with the Hammersmith Socialist Society, and in October 1891 oversaw the creation of a short-lived newsletter, the Hammersmith Socialist Record. Coming to oppose factionalism within the socialist movement, he sought to rebuild his relationship with the SDF, appearing as a guest lecturer at some of their events and supporting SDF candidate George Lansbury when he stood in the Wandsworth by-election of February 1894. In 1893 the Hammersmith Socialist Society co-founded the Joint Committee of Socialist Bodies with representatives of the SDF and Fabian Society; Morris helped draw up its "Manifesto of English Socialists". He offered support for leftist activists on trial, including a number of militant anarchists whose violent tactics he nevertheless denounced. He also began using the term "communism" for the first time, stating that "Communism is in fact the completion of Socialism: when that ceases to be militant and becomes triumphant, it will be communism." In December 1895 he gave his final open-air talk at Stepniak's funeral, where he spoke alongside the socialist Eleanor Marx, trade unionist Keir Hardie, and anarchist Errico Malatesta. Liberated from internal factional struggles, he retracted his anti-parliamentary position and worked for socialist unity, giving his last public lecture in January 1896 on the subject of "One Socialist Party."

In December 1888, the Chiswick Press published Morris's The House of the Wolfings, a fantasy story set in Iron Age Europe which provides a reconstructed portrait of the lives of Germanic-speaking Gothic tribes. It contained both prose and aspects of poetic verse. A sequel, The Roots of the Mountains, followed in 1889. Over the coming years he would publish a string of other poetic works: The Story of the Glittering Plain (1890), The Wood Beyond the World (1894), The Well at the World's End (1896), The Water of the Wondrous Isles (1897) and The Sundering Flood (1898). He also embarked on a translation of the Anglo-Saxon tale Beowulf; because he could not fully understand Old English, his poetic translation was based largely on that already produced by Alfred John Wyatt. On publication, Morris's archaizing Beowulf was critically panned. Following the death of the sitting Poet Laureate of Great Britain and Ireland, Alfred, Lord Tennyson, in October 1892, Morris was offered the position but turned it down, disliking its associations with the monarchy and political establishment; instead the position went to Alfred Austin.

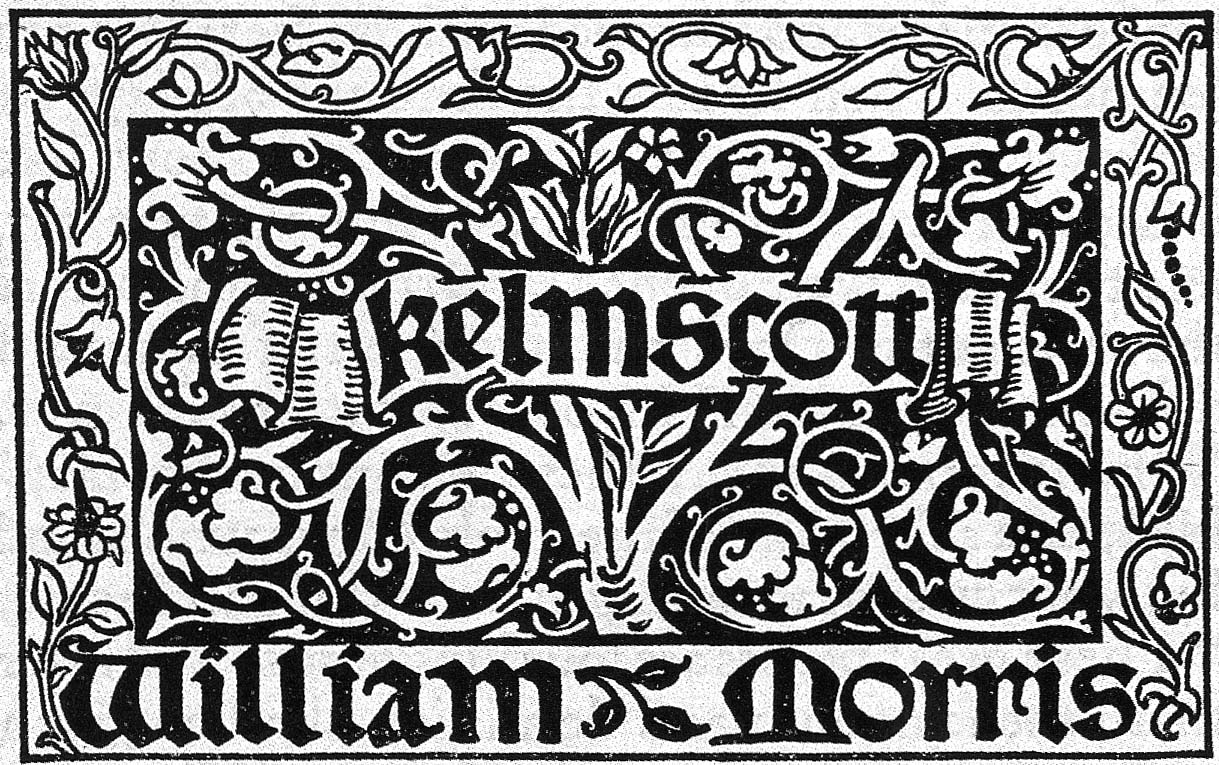
Morris's design for the Kelmscott Press trademark

In January 1891, Morris founded the Kelmscott Press, a private press which would go on to publish the celebrated Kelmscott Chaucer. By the early 1890s, Morris was increasingly ill and living largely as an invalid; aside from his gout, he also exhibited signs of epilepsy. In August 1891, he took his daughter Jenny on a tour of Northern France to visit the medieval churches and cathedrals. Back in England, he spent an increasing amount of time at Kelmscott Manor. Seeking treatment from the prominent doctor William Broadbent, he was prescribed a holiday in the coastal town of Folkestone. In December 1894 he was devastated upon learning of his 90-year-old mother's death.

In July 1896, Morris went on a cruise to Norway with construction engineer John Carruthers, during which he visited Vadsø and Trondheim; during the trip his physical condition deteriorated and he began experiencing hallucinations. Returning to Kelmscott House, he became a complete invalid, being visited by friends and family, before dying of tuberculosis on the morning of 3 October 1896. Obituaries appearing throughout the national press reflected that at the time, Morris was widely recognised primarily as a poet. Mainstream press obituaries trivialised or dismissed his involvement in socialism, although the socialist press focused largely on this aspect of his career. His funeral was held on 6 October, during which his corpse was carried from Hammersmith to Paddington rail station, where it was transported to Oxford, and from there to Kelmscott, where it was buried in the churchyard of St George's Church.

== Personal life ==
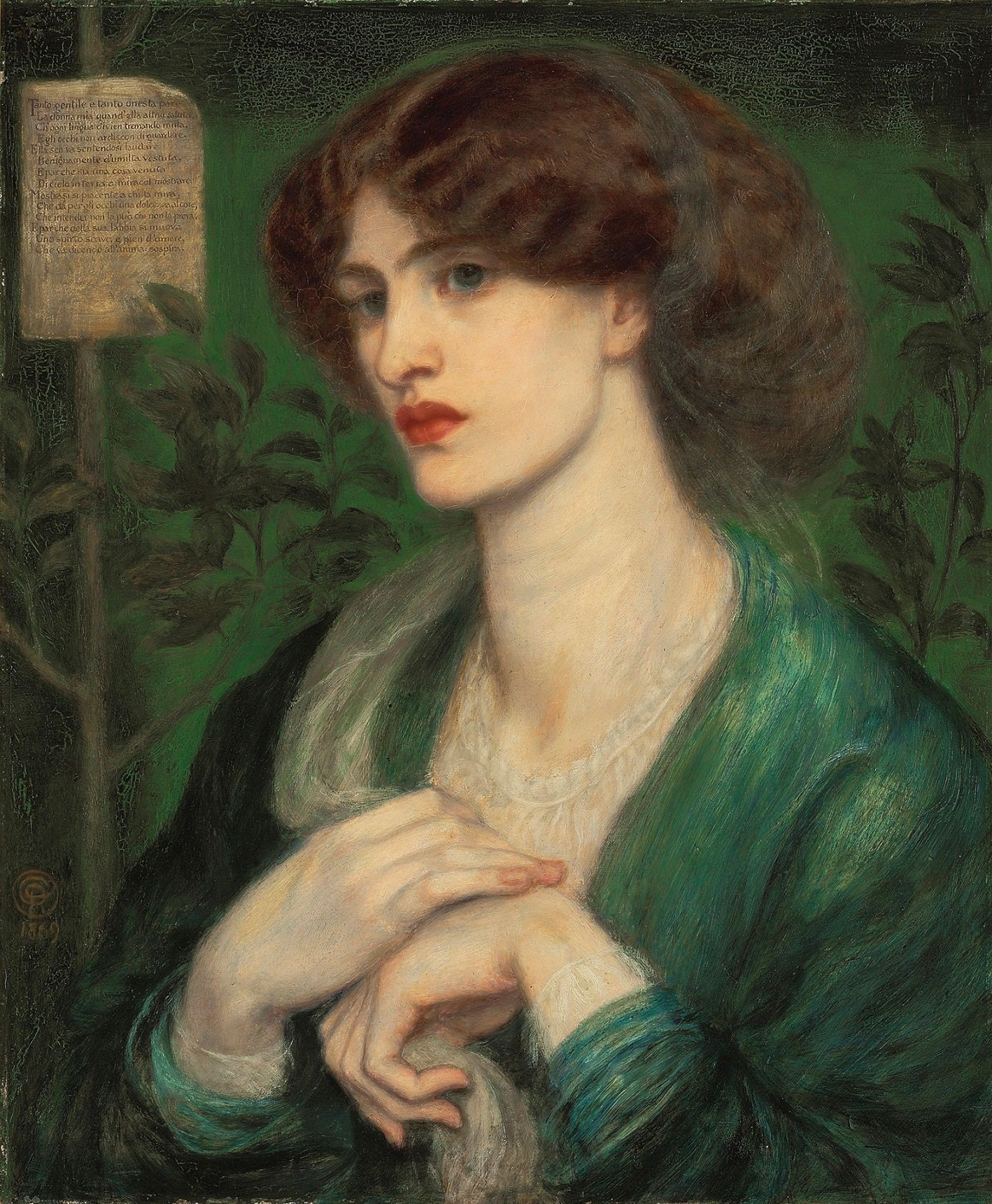
The Salutation of Beatrice, Jane Morris portrayed by Dante Gabriel Rossetti as Dante Alighieri's muse, Beatrice, 1869

Morris's biographer E. P. Thompson described him as having a "robust bearing, and a slight roll in his walk", alongside a "rough beard" and "disordered hair". The author Henry James described Morris as "short, burly, corpulent, very careless and unfinished in his dress ... He has a loud voice and a nervous restless manner and a perfectly unaffected and businesslike address. His talk indeed is wonderfully to the point and remarkable for clear good sense." Morris's first biographer Mackail described him as being both "a typical Englishman" and "a typical Londoner of the middle class" albeit one who was transformed into "something quite individual" through the "force of his genius". MacCarthy described Morris's lifestyle as being "late Victorian, mildly bohemian, but bourgeois", with Mackail commenting that he exhibited many of the traits of the bourgeois Victorian class: "industrious, honest, fair-minded up their lights, but unexpansive and unsympathetic". Although he generally disliked children, Morris also exhibited a strong sense of responsibility towards his family. Mackail nevertheless thought he "was interested in things much more than in people" and that while he did have "lasting friendships" and "deep affections", he did not allow people to "penetrate to the central part of him."

Politically, Morris was a staunch revolutionary socialist and anti-imperialist, and although raised a Christian he came to be an atheist. He came to reject state socialism and large centralised control, instead emphasising localised administration within a socialist society. Later political activist Derek Wall suggested that Morris could be classified as an ecosocialist. Morris was greatly influenced by Romanticism, with Thompson asserting that Romanticism was "bred into his bones, and formed his early consciousness." Thompson argued that this "Romantic Revolt" was part of a "passionate protest against an intolerable social reality", that of the industrial capitalism of Britain's Victorian era. He believed that it led to little more than a "yearning nostalgia or a sweet complaint" and that Morris became "a realist and a revolutionary" only when he adopted socialism in 1882. Mackail was of the opinion that Morris had an "innate Socialism" which had "penetrated and dominated all he did" throughout his life. Given the conflict between his personal and professional life and his socio-political views, MacCarthy described Morris as "a conservative radical".

Morris's behaviour was often erratic. He was of a nervous disposition, and throughout his life relied on networks of male friends to aid him in dealing with this. Morris's friends nicknamed him "Topsy" after a character in Uncle Tom's Cabin. He had a wild temper and when sufficiently enraged could suffer seizures and blackouts. Rossetti was known to taunt Morris to enrage him for the amusement of himself and their other friends. Biographer Fiona MacCarthy suggests that Morris suffered from a form of Tourette's syndrome. In later life he suffered from gout, a common complaint among middle-class men in the Victorian period. Morris sought Aglaia Coronio's comfort and sympathy during the most turbulent times in his marriage when his wife, Jane Morris, and Dante Gabriel Rossetti had an affair.

Morris's ethos was that one should "have nothing in your houses that you do not know to be useful or believe to be beautiful." He also held to the view that "No work which cannot be done with pleasure in the doing is worth doing" and adopted as his motto "As I can" from the fifteenth-century Flemish painter Jan van Eyck.

== Work ==
=== Literature ===
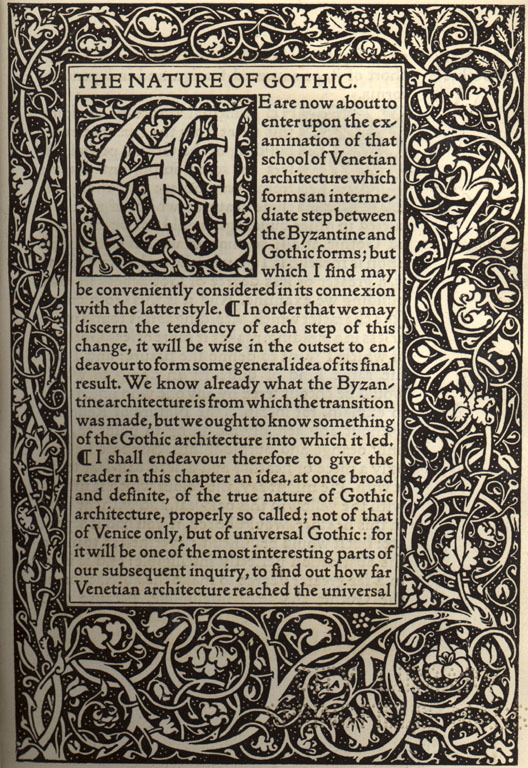
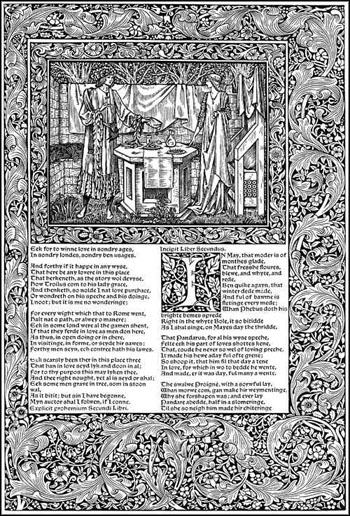
Left: The Nature of Gothic by John Ruskin, printed by Kelmscott Press. First page of text, with typical ornamented border. Right: Troilus and Criseyde, from the Kelmscott Chaucer. Illustration by Burne-Jones and decorations and typefaces by Morris.

Besides being an artist William Morris was a prolific writer of poetry, fiction, essays, and translations of ancient and medieval texts. His first poems were published when he was 24 years old, and he was polishing his final novel, The Sundering Flood, at the time of his death. His daughter May's edition of Morris's Collected Works (1910–1915) runs to 24 volumes, and two more were published in 1936.

Morris began publishing poetry and short stories in 1856 through The Oxford and Cambridge Magazine which he founded with his friends and financed while at university. His first volume, The Defence of Guenevere and Other Poems (1858), was the first book of Pre-Raphaelite poetry to be published. The dark poems, set in a sombre world of violence, were coolly received by the critics, and he was discouraged from publishing more for a number of years. "The Haystack in the Floods", one of the poems in that collection, is probably now one of his better-known poems. It is a grimly realistic piece set during the Hundred Years War in which the doomed lovers Jehane and Robert have a last parting in a convincingly portrayed rain-swept countryside. One early minor poem was "Masters in this Hall" (1860), a Christmas carol written to an old French tune. Another Christmas-themed poem is "The Snow in the Street", adapted from "The Land East of the Sun and West of the Moon" in The Earthly Paradise.

Morris met Eiríkur Magnússon in 1868, and began to learn the Icelandic language from him. Morris published translations of The Saga of Gunnlaug Worm-Tongue and Grettis Saga in 1869, and the Story of the Volsungs and Niblungs in 1870. An additional volume was published under the title of Three Northern Love Stories in 1873.

In the last nine years of his life, Morris wrote a series of imaginative fictions usually referred to as the "prose romances". These novels – including The Wood Beyond the World and The Well at the World's End – have been credited as important milestones in the history of fantasy fiction, because, while other writers wrote of foreign lands, or of dream worlds, or the future (as Morris did in News from Nowhere), Morris's works were the first to be set in an entirely invented fantasy world. These were attempts to revive the genre of medieval romance, and written in imitation of medieval prose. Morris's prose style in these novels has been praised by Edward James, who described them as "among the most lyrical and enchanting fantasies in the English language."

On the other hand, L. Sprague de Camp considered Morris's fantasies to be not wholly successful, partly because Morris eschewed many literary techniques from later eras. In particular, De Camp argued the plots of the novels are heavily driven by coincidence; while many things just happened in the romances, the novels are still weakened by the dependence on it. Nevertheless, large subgenres of the field of fantasy have sprung from the romance genre, but indirectly, through their writers' imitation of William Morris.

Early fantasy writers like Lord Dunsany, E. R. Eddison and James Branch Cabell were familiar with Morris's romances. The Wood Beyond the World is considered to have heavily influenced C. S. Lewis's Narnia series, while J. R. R. Tolkien was inspired by Morris's reconstructions of early Germanic life in The House of the Wolfings and The Roots of the Mountains. The young Tolkien attempted a retelling of the story of Kullervo from the Kalevala in the style of The House of the Wolfings; Tolkien considered much of his literary work to have been inspired by an early reading of Morris, even suggesting that he was unable to better Morris's work; the names of characters such as "Gandolf" and the horse Silverfax appear in The Well at the World's End.

Sir Henry Newbolt's medieval allegorical novel Aladore was influenced by Morris's fantasies. James Joyce also drew inspiration from his work.

=== Textile design ===
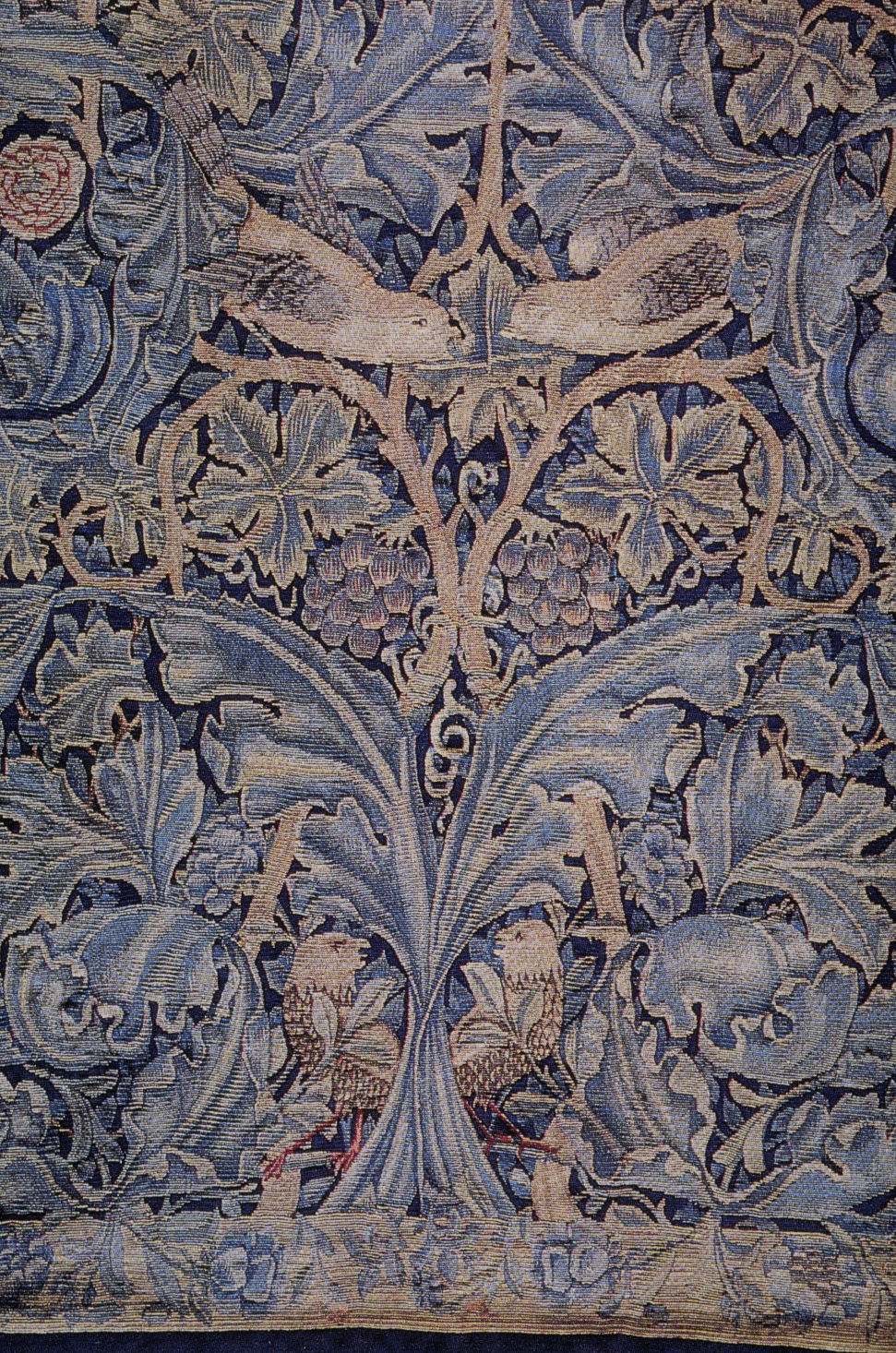
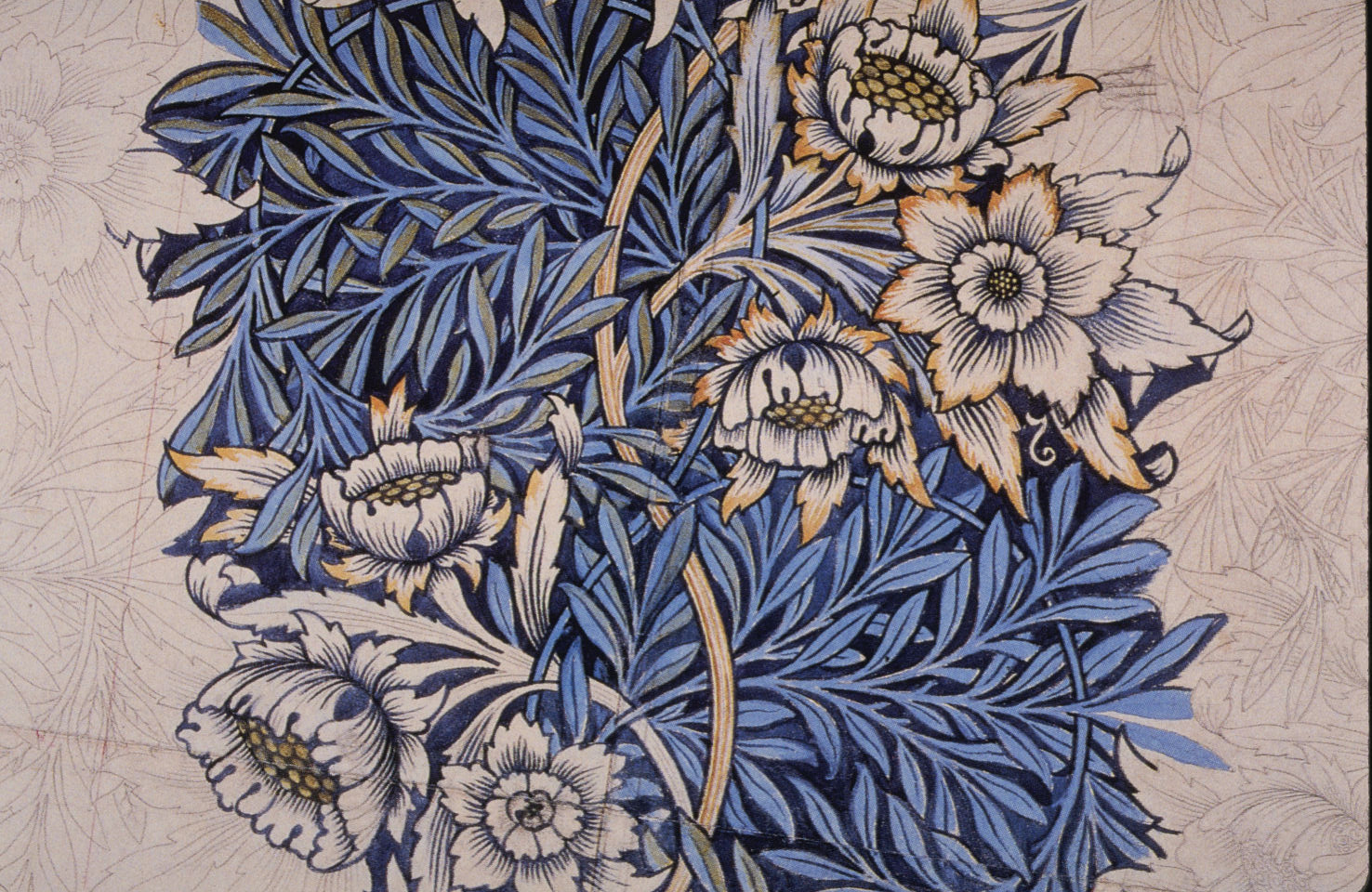
Left: Cabbage and vine tapestry, 1879. Right: Design for "Tulip and Willow" indigo-discharge wood-block printed fabric, 1873.

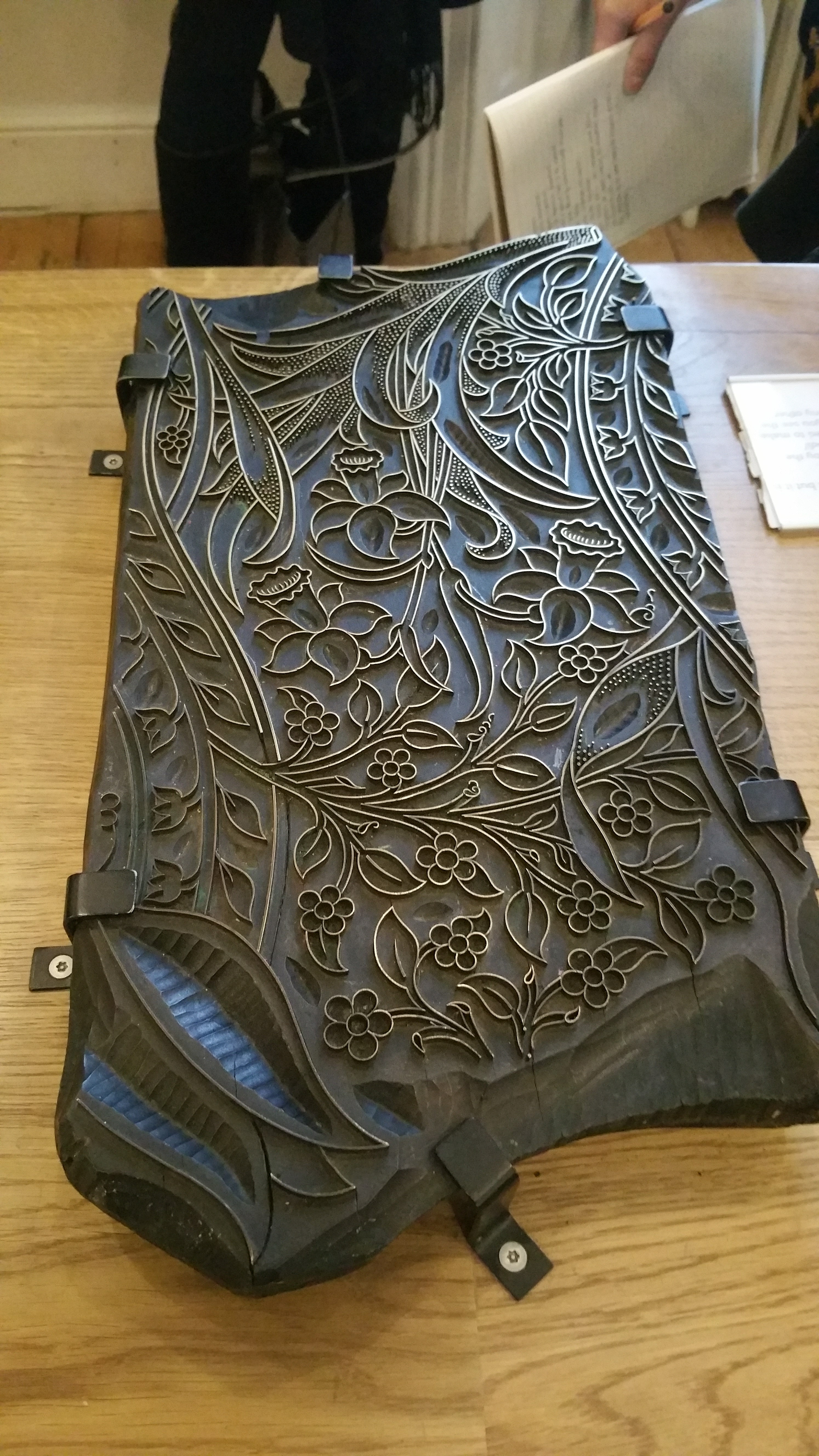
A wooden pattern for textile printing from William Morris's company

During his lifetime, Morris produced items in a range of crafts, mainly those to do with furnishing, including over 600 designs for wall-paper, textiles, and embroideries, over 150 for stained glass windows, three typefaces, and around 650 borders and ornamentations for the Kelmscott Press. He emphasised the idea that the design and production of an item should not be divorced from one another, and that where possible those creating items should be designer-craftsmen, thereby both designing and manufacturing their goods. In the field of textile design, Morris revived a number of dead techniques, and insisted on the use of good quality raw materials, almost all natural dyes, and hand processing. He also observed the natural world first hand to gain a basis for his designs, and insisted on learning the techniques of production prior to producing a design.

Mackail asserted that Morris became "a manufacturer not because he wished to make money, but because he wished to make the things he manufactured." Morris & Co.'s designs were fashionable among Britain's upper and middle-classes, with biographer Fiona MacCarthy asserting that they had become "the safe choice of the intellectual classes, an exercise in political correctitude." The company's unique selling point was the range of different items that it produced, as well as the ethos of artistic control over production that it emphasised.

It is likely that much of Morris's preference for medieval textiles was formed – or crystallised – during his brief apprenticeship with G. E. Street. Street had co-written a book on Ecclesiastical Embroidery in 1848, and was a staunch advocate of abandoning faddish woolen work on canvas in favour of more expressive embroidery techniques based on Opus Anglicanum, a surface embroidery technique popular in medieval England.

He was also fond of hand-knotted Persian carpet and advised the South Kensington Museum in the acquisition of fine Kerman carpets.

Morris taught himself embroidery, working with wool on a frame custom-built from an old example. Once he had mastered the technique he trained his wife Jane, her sister Bessie Burden and others to execute designs to his specifications. When "embroideries of all kinds" were offered through Morris, Marshall, Faulkner & Co. catalogues, church embroidery became and remained an important line of business for its successor companies into the twentieth century. By the 1870s, the firm was offering both embroidery patterns and finished works. Following in Street's footsteps, Morris became active in the growing movement to return originality and mastery of technique to embroidery, and was one of the first designers associated with the Royal School of Art Needlework with its aim to "restore Ornamental Needlework for secular purposes to the high place it once held among decorative arts."

Morris took up the practical art of dyeing as a necessary adjunct of his manufacturing business. He spent much of his time at Staffordshire dye works mastering the processes of that art and making experiments in the revival of old or discovery of new methods. One result of these experiments was to reinstate indigo dyeing as a practical industry and generally to renew the use of those vegetable dyes, such as the red derived from madder, which had been driven almost out of use by the anilines. Dyeing of wools, silks, and cottons was the necessary preliminary to what he had much at heart, the production of woven and printed fabrics of the highest excellence; and the period of incessant work at the dye-vat (1875–1876) was followed by a period during which he was absorbed in the production of textiles (1877–1878), and more especially in the revival of carpet-weaving as a fine art.

Morris's patterns for woven textiles, some of which were also machine made under ordinary commercial conditions, included intricate double-woven furnishing fabrics in which two sets of warps and wefts are interlinked to create complex gradations of colour and texture. Morris long dreamed of weaving tapestries in the medieval manner, which he called "the noblest of the weaving arts." In September 1879 he finished his first solo effort, a small piece called "Cabbage and Vine".

While Morris is well known for his opposition to industrial production techniques he none the less designed and produced several textile pieces for the Jacquard loom.

=== Book illustration and design ===
Nineteenth- and twentieth-century avant-garde artistic movements took an interest in the typographical arts, greatly enriching book design and illustration. Morris's designs, like the work of the Pre-Raphaelite painters with whom he was associated, referred frequently to medieval motifs. In 1891, he founded the Kelmscott Press, which by the time it closed in 1898 had produced more than fifty works using traditional printing methods, a hand-driven press and hand-made paper. They included his masterpiece, an edition of the Works of Geoffrey Chaucer with illustrations by Edward Burne-Jones. Morris invented three distinctive typefaces – Golden, Troy, and Chaucer, with the text being framed with intricate floral borders similar to illuminated medieval manuscripts. His work inspired many small private presses in the following century.

Morris's aesthetic and social values became a leading force in the Arts and Crafts Movement. The Kelmscott Press influenced much of the fine press movement in England and the United States during the late nineteenth and early twentieth centuries. It brought the need for books that were aesthetic objects as well as words to the attention of the reading and publishing worlds.

At Kelmscott Press, the book-making was under his constant supervision and practical assistance. It was his ambition to produce work that recreated the beauty of illuminated lettering, gilding and binding that used to make a volume a treasured possession. Morris designed his type after what he deemed the best examples of early printers, what he called his "golden type" which he copied after Jenson, Parautz, Coburger and others. With this in mind, Morris chose the paper which he adapted to his subject with the same care with which he selected his material for binding. As a result, only the wealthy could purchase his lavish works; Morris realized that creating works in the manner of the Middle Ages was difficult in a profit-oriented society.

== Legacy ==
Morris family tombstone at Kelmscott, designed by Webb

President of the William Morris Society Hans Brill referred to Morris as "one of the outstanding figures of the nineteenth century", while Linda Parry termed him the "single most important figure in British textile production". At the time of Morris's death, his poetry was known internationally and his company's products were found all over the world. In his lifetime, he was best known as a poet, although by the late twentieth century he was primarily known as a designer of wallpapers and fabrics.

He was a major contributor to the revival of traditional British textile arts and methods of production. Morris's ethos of production was an influence on the Bauhaus movement. Another aspect of Morris's preservationism was his desire to protect the natural world from the ravages of pollution and industrialism, causing some historians of the green movement to regard Morris as an important forerunner of modern environmentalism.

Aymer Vallance was commissioned to produce the first biography of Morris, published in 1897, after Morris's death, per the latter's wishes. This presented the creation of the Society for the Protection of Ancient Buildings as Morris's greatest achievement. Morris's next biographer was Burne-Jones's son-in-law John William Mackail, who authored the two-volume Life of William Morris (1899) in which he provided a sympathetic portrayal of Morris that largely omitted his political activities, treating them as a passing phase that Morris overcame.

MacCarthy's biography, William Morris: A Life for Our Time, was first published by Faber and Faber in 1994, and a paperback edition was published in 2010. For the 2013 Venice Biennale, artist Jeremy Deller selected Morris as the subject of a large-scale mural titled "We Sit Starving Amidst our Gold", in which Morris returns from the dead to hurl the yacht of Russian billionaire Roman Abramovich into the waves of an ocean.

MacCarthy curated the "Anarchy & Beauty" exhibition—a commemoration of Morris's legacy—for the National Portrait Gallery in 2014, for which she recruited around 70 artists who were required to undertake a test on Morris's News from Nowhere to be accepted. Writing for The Guardian prior to the opening of the exhibition on 16 October 2014, MacCarthy asserted:

Morris has exerted a powerful influence on thinking about art and design over the past century. He has been the constant niggle in the conscience. How can we combat all this luxury and waste? What drove him into revolutionary activism was his anger and shame at the injustices within society. He burned with guilt at the fact that his "good fortune only" allowed him to live in beautiful surroundings and to pursue the work he adored.

"Anarchy & Beauty"'s arts and crafts section featured Morris's own copy of the French edition of Karl Marx's Das Kapital handbound in a gold-tooled leather binding that MacCarthy describes as "the ultimate example of Morris's conviction that perfectionism of design and craftsmanship should be available to everyone."

In 2002, Morris was honoured by Waltham Forest London Borough Council with the naming of the William Morris ward.

In 2014, the Metropolitan Museum of Art exhibited William Morris: Textiles and Wallpaper, displaying early decorative arts the Morris, Marshall, Faulkner, and Company and later Morris & Company produced.

In 2016, Arts Catalyst commissioned British artist and academic David Mabb to produce a work responding to the use of Morris's designs in the living quarters aboard British nuclear submarines from the 1960s to the 1990s. The resulting work, A Provisional Monument to Nuclear Disarmament, was exhibited first at KARST in Plymouth and later at the Bildmuseet in Umea, Sweden.

From 6 October 2017 - 21 January 2018, the Fundación Juan March Madrid exhibited William Morris and Company. The Arts and Crafts Movement in Great Britain. The exhibition was co-organized with the Museu Nacional d'Art de Catalunya, Barcelona where the exhibit was on display 22 February - 20 May 2018. The exhibit was accompanied with a catalog (available only in Spanish) William Morris y compañía el movimiento Arts & Crafts en Gran Bretaña. (ISBN 978-8-470-75649-8)

In 2025, the William Morris Gallery opened the exhibition Morris Mania, examining how Morris's designs became globally recognised.

=== Notable collections and house museums ===
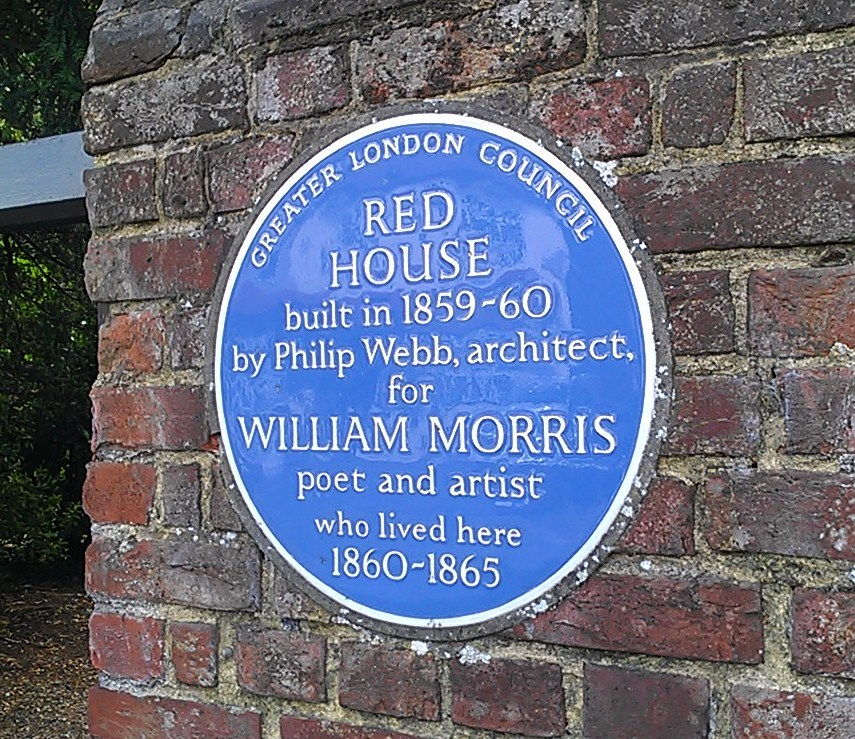
The blue plaque erected outside the Red House

A number of galleries and museums house important collections of Morris's work and decorative items commissioned from Morris & Co. The William Morris Gallery in Walthamstow, England, is a public museum devoted to Morris's life, work and influence. The William Morris Society is based at Morris's final London home, Kelmscott House, Hammersmith, and is an international members society, museum and venue for lectures and other Morris-related events.

The Art Gallery of South Australia is "fortunate in holding the most comprehensive collection of Morris & Co. furnishings outside Britain". The collection includes books, embroideries, tapestries, fabrics, wallpapers, drawings and sketches, furniture and stained glass, and forms the focus of two published works (produced to accompany special exhibitions). In July 2026, illuminations featuring William Morris textile designs will be projected onto the façade of the Carrick Hill historic mansion, also in South Australia.

The former "green dining room" at the Victoria and Albert Museum is now its "Morris Room". The V&A's British Galleries house other decorative works by Morris and his associates.

One of the meeting rooms in the Oxford Union, decorated with the wallpaper in his style, is named the Morris Room.

Wightwick Manor in the West Midlands, England, is a notable example of the Morris & Co. style, with lots of original Morris wallpapers, fabrics, carpets, and furniture, May Morris art and embroidery, De Morgan tiles, and Pre-Raphaelite works of art, managed by the National Trust. Standen in West Sussex, England, was designed by Webb between 1892 and 1894 and decorated with Morris carpets, fabrics and wallpapers. The illustrator Edward Linley Sambourne chose to decorate his London family home 18 Stafford Terrace with many Morris & Co wallpapers, which have been preserved and can still be seen today. Morris's homes Red House and Kelmscott Manor have been preserved. Red House was acquired by the National Trust in 2003 and is open to the public. Kelmscott Manor is owned by the Society of Antiquaries of London and is open to the public.

7, Hammersmith Terrace is the former home of Sir Emery Walker, a close friend and colleague of Morris. The house is decorated in the Arts & Crafts style, including with extensive collections of Morris wallpaper, furniture, and textiles. 7, Hammersmith Terrace is operated by the Emery Walker Trust, and is open to the public for tours.

The William Morris House, later named the William Morris Meeting Rooms, was established in 1922 in Wimbledon, in the London Borough of Merton. The Victorian building was chosen by the local Labour movement for local people and their organisations to have meeting rooms, with the house being opened by Arthur Henderson. The cooperative society that owns the site was named after Morris due to his enduring impact on both Wimbledon and the wider labour movement. The house contains a photograph of Morris taken by Sir Emery Walker which was gifted to the house by his daughter, May Morris. Furthermore, George Bernard Shaw took an interest in the house, sending a signed photograph of himself in 1930, with the inscription reading: "William Morris and I preached the Gospel of Labour together on many occasions. Many respectable persons thought we deserved hanging. I am proud to hang in a hall dedicated to him."

The Huntington Library, Art Collections and Botanical Gardens in San Marino, California, acquired the collection of Morris materials amassed by Sanford and Helen Berger in 1999. The collection includes stained glass, wallpaper, textiles, embroidery, drawings, ceramics, more than 2000 books, original woodblocks, and the complete archives of both Morris, Marshall, Faulkner & Co. and Morris & Co. These materials formed the foundation for the 2002 exhibition William Morris: Creating the Useful and the Beautiful and the 2003 exhibition The Beauty of Life: William Morris and the Art of Design and accompanying publication.

A Greater London Council blue plaque at Red House commemorates Morris and architect Philip Webb.

In 2013, the Cary Graphic Arts Collection at Rochester Institute of Technology bought William Morris's London-built Hopkinson & Cope Improved Albion press (No. 6551) at auction for $233,000. This printing press was specially reinforced to produce Morris's Chaucer in 1896. Other owners of Morris's Albion press include Frederic Goudy and J. Ben Lieberman.

In 2023, Walthamstow F.C. launched a new home football shirt with Admiral Sports featuring a William Morris print. The shirt was widely regarded as one of the best kit launches of the year and eventually won the Wood Pencil D&AD award for Printed Graphic.

== Literary works ==
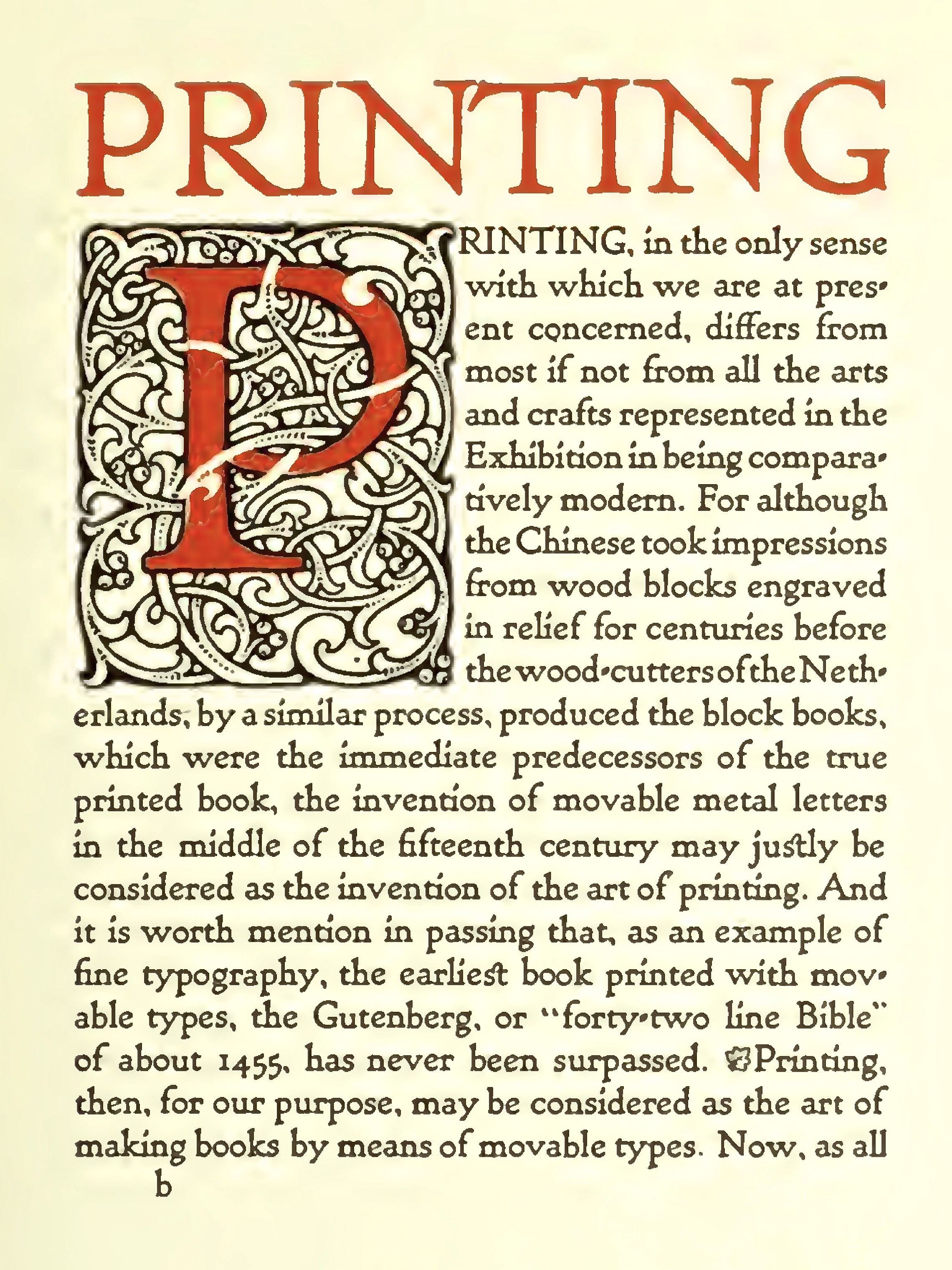
Morris's essay "Printing" as reprinted by the Village Press in Chicago run by Will Ransom and Frederic Goudy, c. 1903

Source:William Morris Archive. Morris's literary works, translations, life and images, the Book Arts

=== Novels ===
- A Dream of John Ball (novella, 1888)
- The House of the Wolfings (1889)
- The Roots of the Mountains (1889)
- News from Nowhere (1890)
- The Story of the Glittering Plain (1891)
- The Wood Beyond the World (1894)
- Child Christopher and Goldilind the Fair (1895)
- The Well at the World's End (1896)
- The Water of the Wondrous Isles (1897)
- The Sundering Flood (1897)

=== Short fiction ===
- Tales from The Oxford and Cambridge Magazine (1856), collected in Golden Wings and Other Stories, including:
  - "The Story of the Unknown Church"
  - "The Hollow Land"
  - "A Dream"
  - "Frank's Sealed Letter"
  - "Gertha's Lovers"
  - "Lindenborg Pool"
  - "Svend and His Brethren"
  - "Golden Wings"
- "A King's Lesson" (1888)

=== Poetry ===
- The Defence of Guenevere, and Other Poems (1858)
- The Life and Death of Jason (1867)
- The Earthly Paradise (1868–1870)
- The Story of Sigurd the Volsung and the Fall of the Niblungs (1877)
- The Pilgrims of Hope (1885)
- Chants for Socialists (1885)
- Poems By the Way (1891)

=== Plays ===
- Scenes from the Fall of Troy (late 1850s)
- Sir Peter Harpdon's End (1858)
- Anthony (late 1860s)
- Love is Enough (1872)
- The Tables Turned (1887)

=== Essays ===
- Hopes and Fears For Art (1882)
- A Summary of the Principles of Socialism (1884)
- Useful Work versus Useless Toil (1885)
- Signs of Change: Lectures on Socialism (1888)
- Arts and Crafts (1889)
- Gothic Architecture (1889)
- Socialism: Its Growth and Outcome (1893) (with E. Belfort Bax)

=== Published lectures and papers ===
- Lectures on Art delivered in support of the Society for the Protection of Ancient Buildings (Morris lecture on The Lesser Arts). London, Macmillan, 1882
- Architecture and History & Westminster Abbey. Papers read to the Society for the Protection of Ancient Buildings in 1884 and 1893. Printed at The Chiswick Press. London, Longmans, 1900
- Communism: a lecture London, Fabian Society, 1903
- Related: William Morris's Socialist Diary, ed. Florence Boos. 1st ed. Journeyman Press; revised edition, Five Leaves Press, 2018.

=== Translations ===
- Grettis Saga: The Story of Grettir the Strong with Eiríkur Magnússon (1869)
- The Story of Gunnlaug the Worm-tongue and Raven the Skald with Eiríkur Magnússon (1869)
- The Völsunga Saga: The Story of the Volsungs and Niblungs, with Certain Songs from the Elder Edda with Eiríkur Magnússon (1870) (from the Volsunga saga)
- Three Northern Love Stories, and Other Tales with Eiríkur Magnússon (1875)
- The Aeneids of Virgil Done into English (1876)
- The Odyssey of Homer Done into English Verse (1887)
- The Saga Library with Eiríkur Magnússon (1891–1905, 6 volumes)
- Of King Florus and the Fair Jehane (1893)
- The Tale of Beowulf Done out of the Old English Tongue (1895)
- Old French Romances Done into English (1896)

Morris's Beowulf was one of the first translations of the Old English poem into modern English.

Grendel reaches Heorot: Beowulf 710–714
Old English verse	Morris's translation
Ðá cóm of móre under misthleoþum	Came then from the moor-land, all under the mist-bents,
Grendel gongan· godes yrre bær·	Grendel a-going there, bearing God's anger.
mynte se mánscaða manna cynnes	The scather the ill one was minded of mankind
sumne besyrwan in sele þám héan·	To have one in his toils from the high hall aloft.

== List of stained-glass works ==
=== England ===
- St Peter's Church, Brooke, Norfolk
- All Saints' Church, Middleton Cheney, Northamptonshire

=== Channel Islands ===
- St Stephen's Church, Guernsey

=== United States ===
- Second Presbyterian Church, Chicago, Illinois

== Gallery ==
=== Morris & Co. stained glass ===
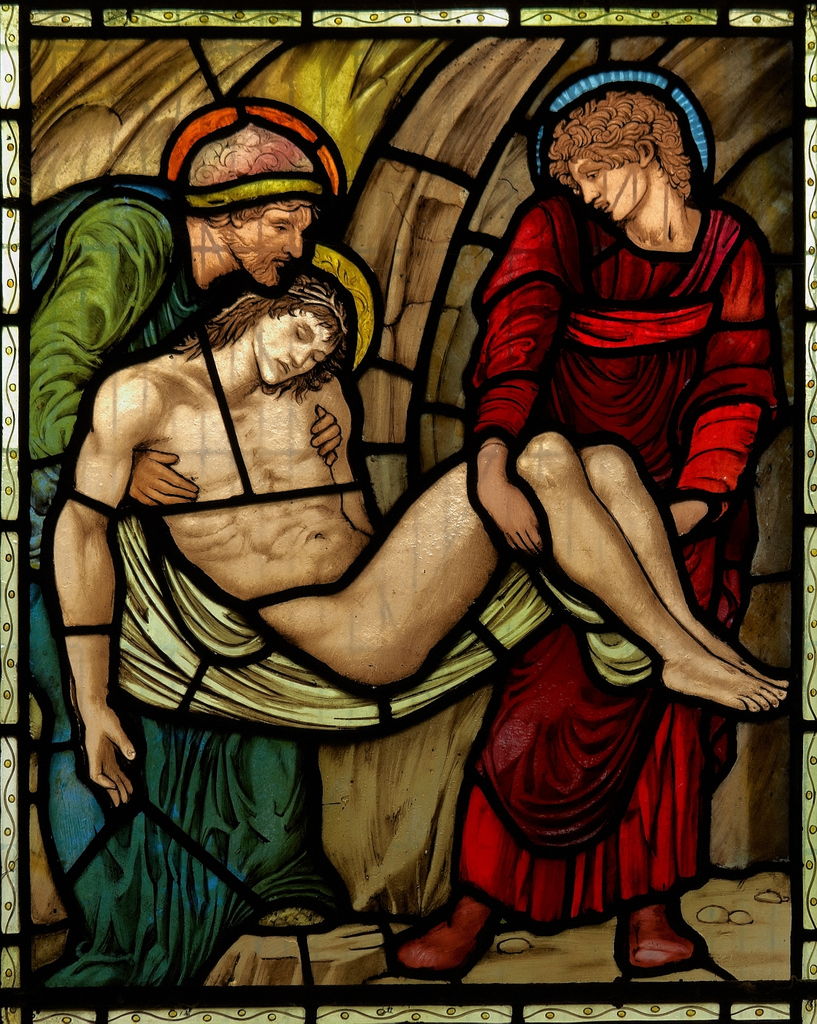
All Saints, Middleton Cheney, Northamptonshire

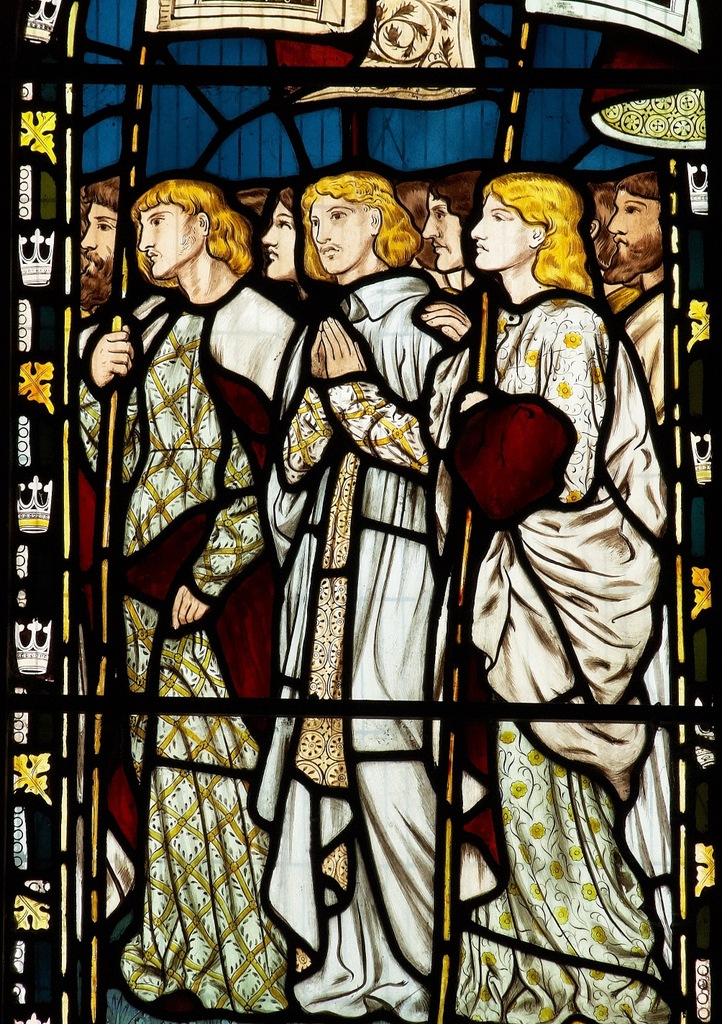
All Saints, Middleton Cheney – Solomon

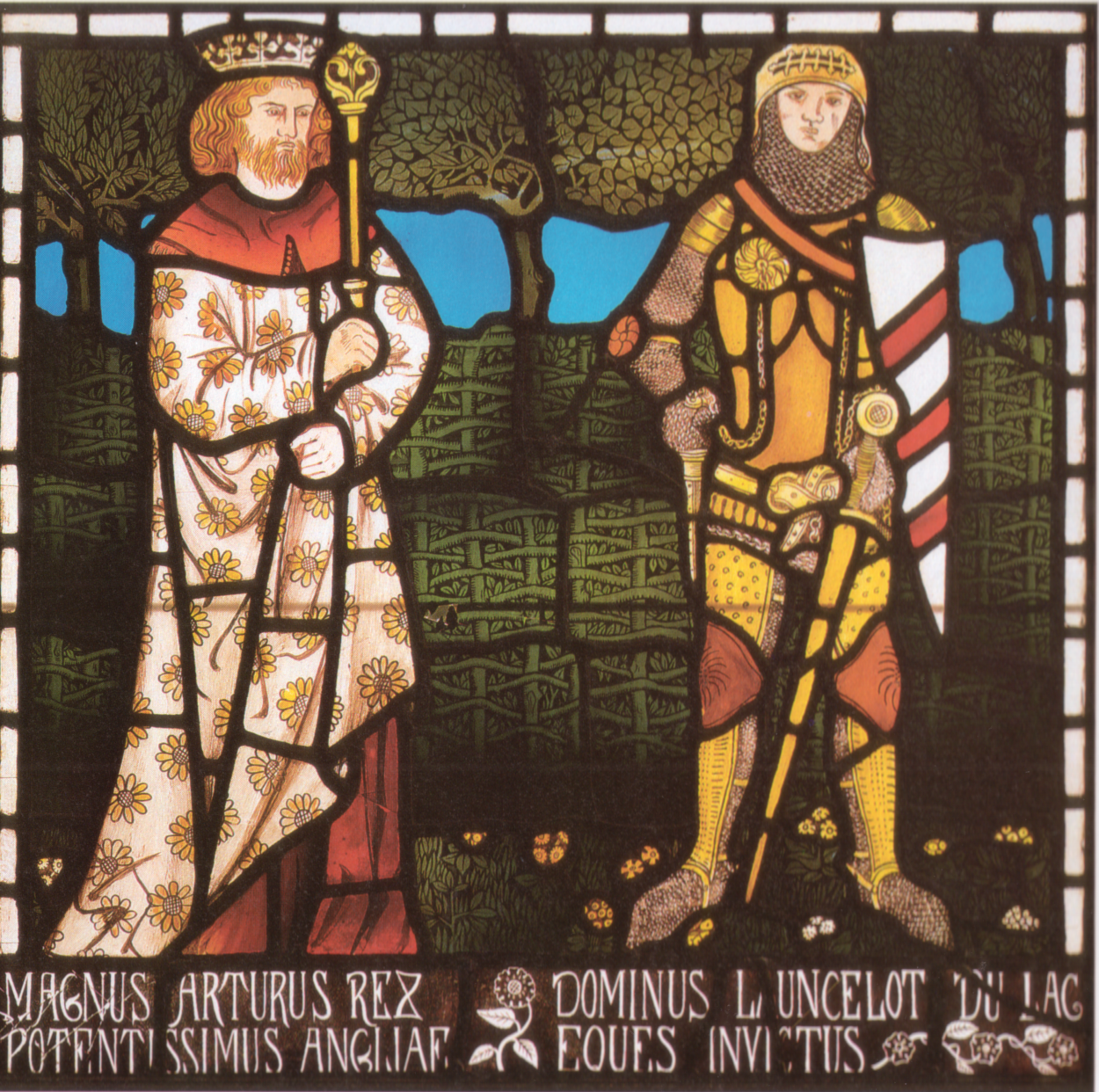
William Morris King Arthur and Sir Lancelot, (1862)

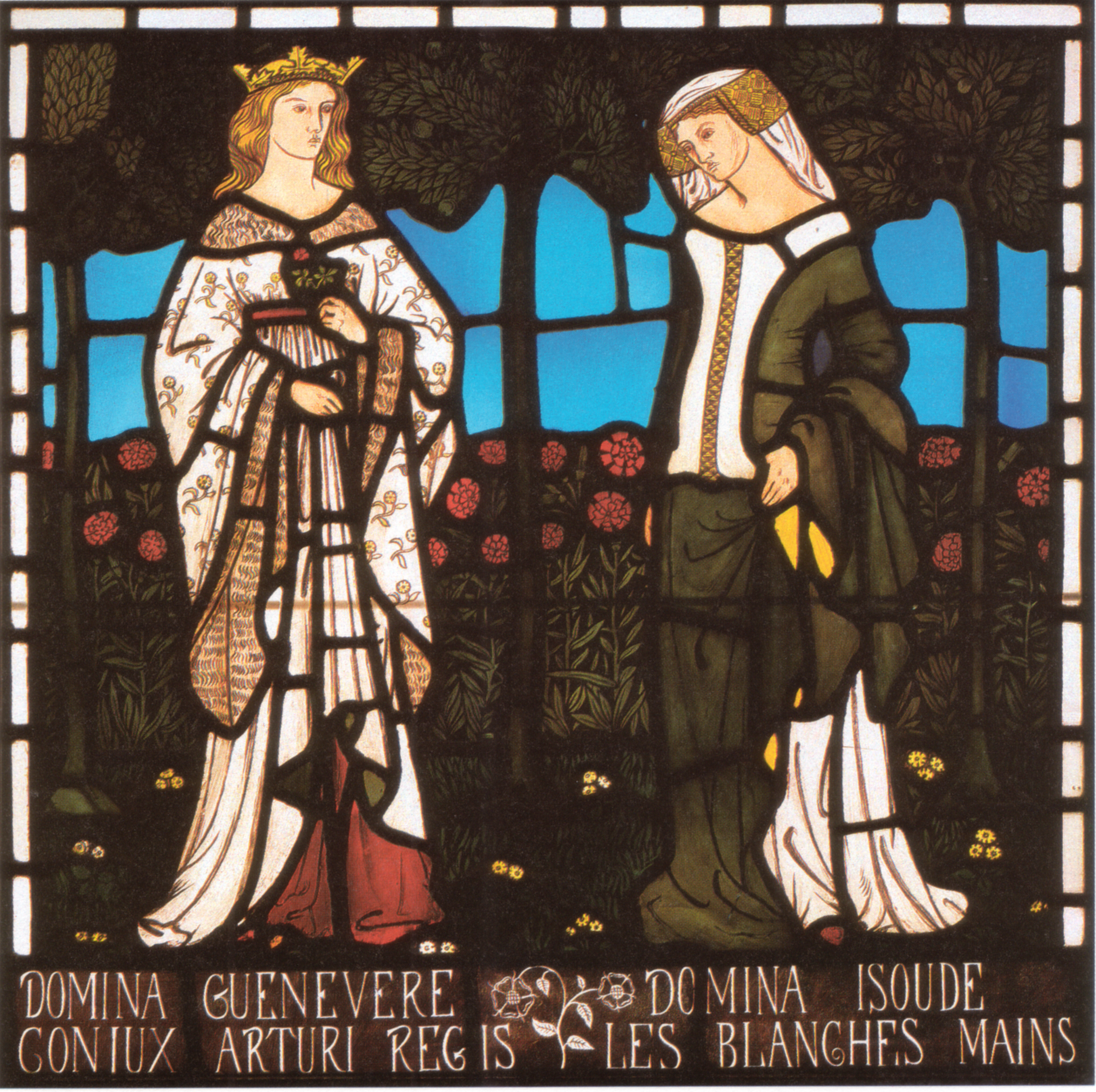
William Morris Queen Guenevere and Isoude, (1862)

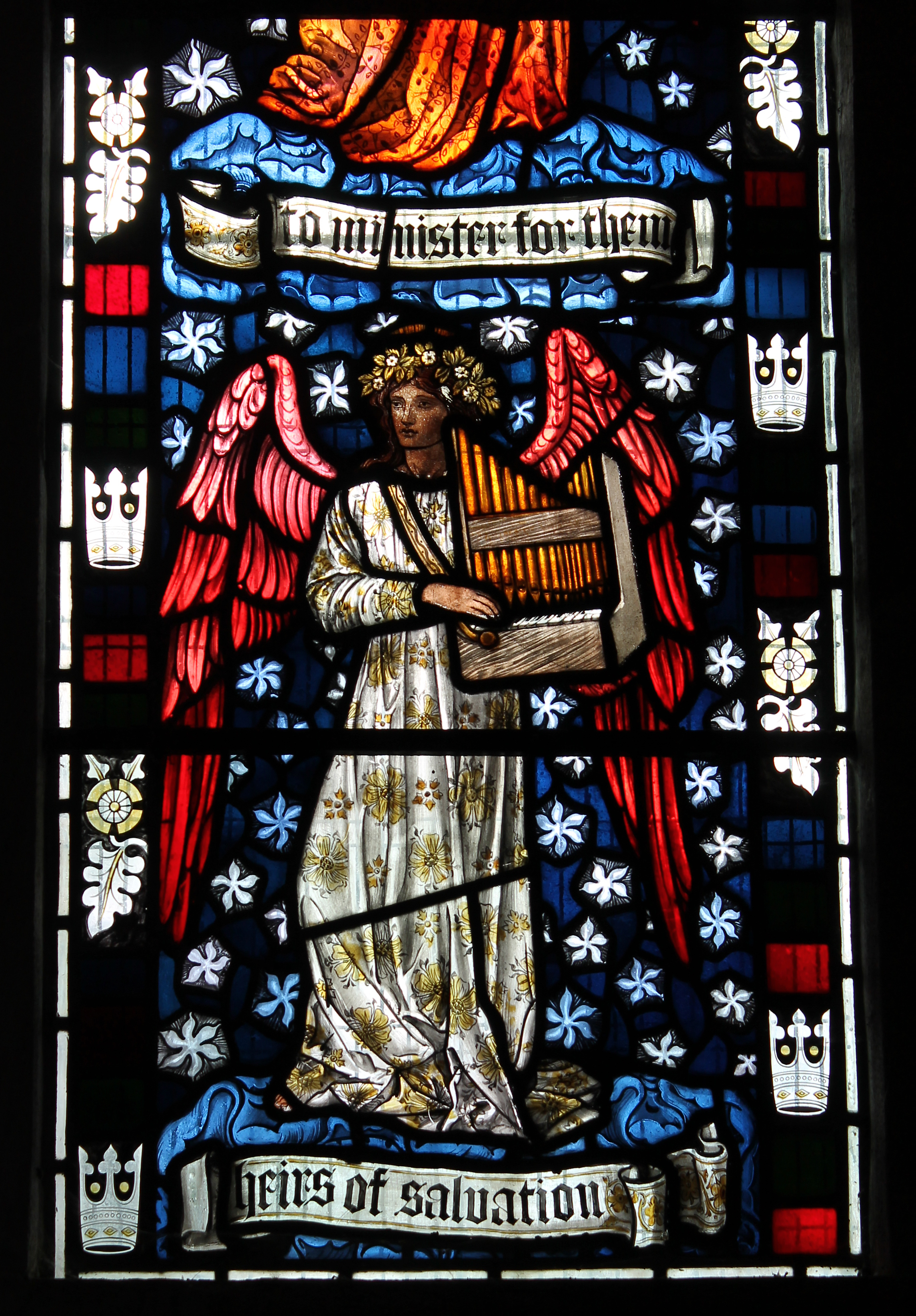
Detail, William Morris window, Cattistock Church, (1882).

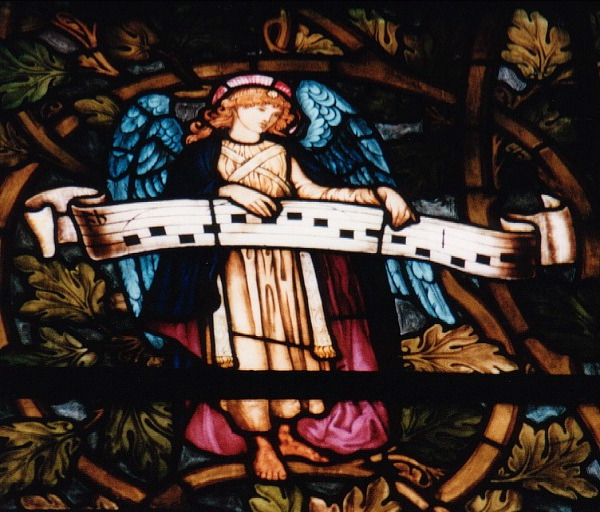
Detail from The Worship of the Shepherds window (1882).

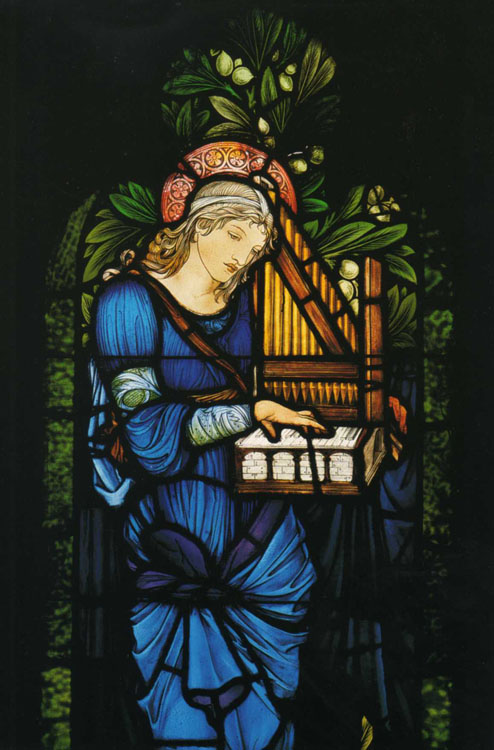
Burne-Jones-designed and Morris & Co.-executed Saint Cecilia window at Second Presbyterian Church (Chicago, Illinois)

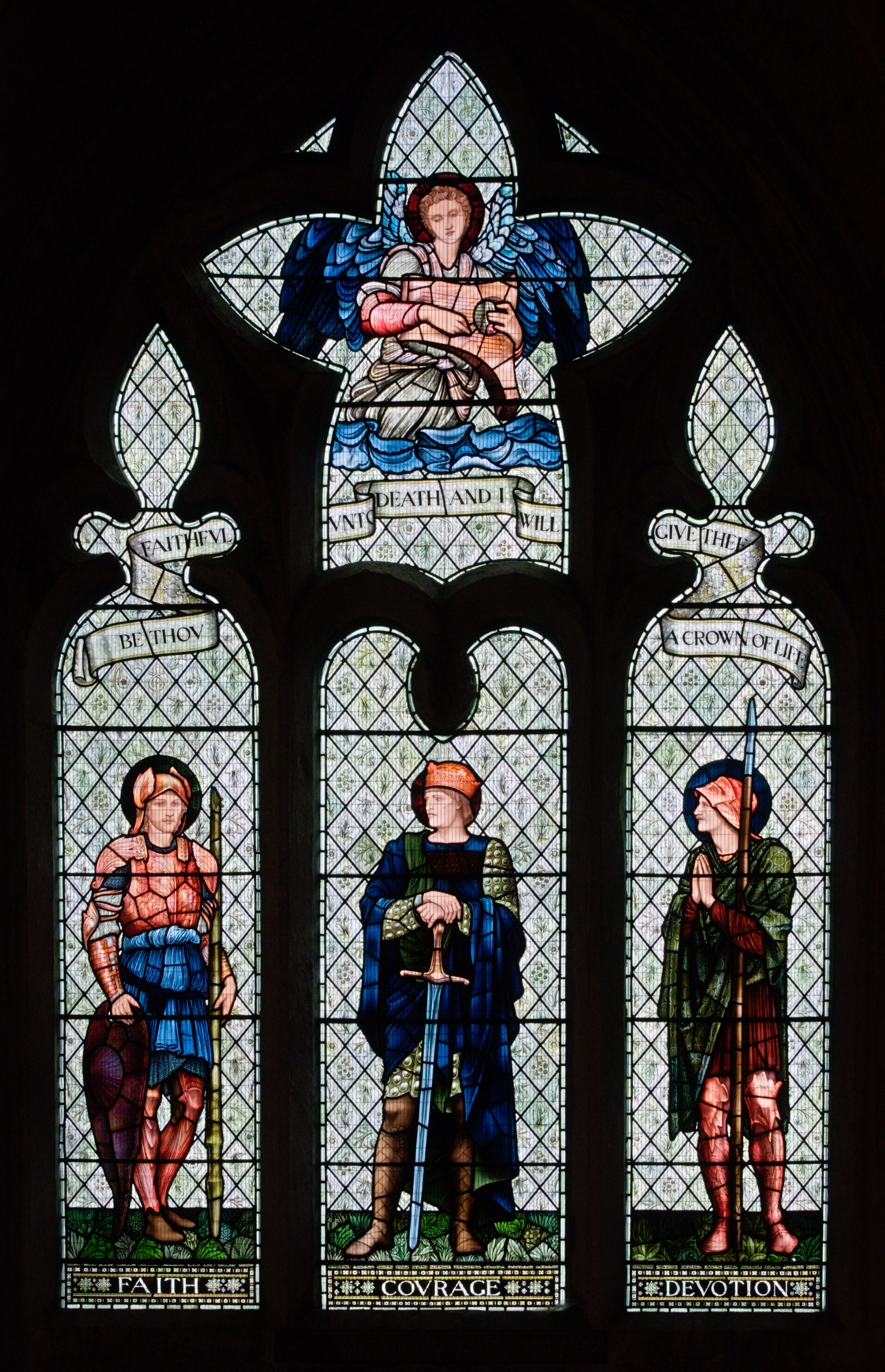
Burne-Jones-designed and Morris & Co.-executed Luce Memorial Window in Malmesbury Abbey, Malmesbury, Wiltshire, England (1901).

=== Morris & Co. patterns ===
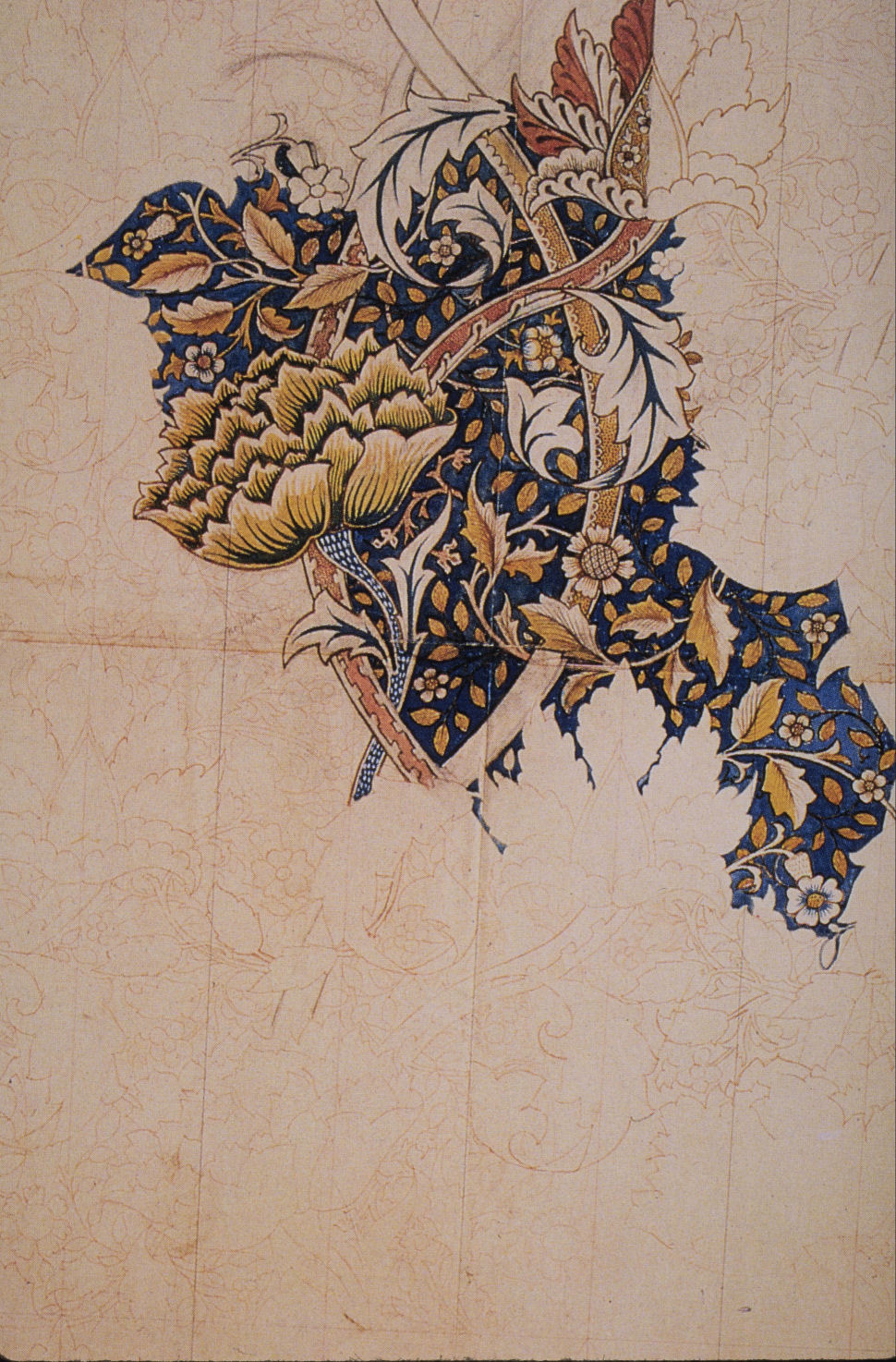
Design for Windrush printed textile, 1881–1883

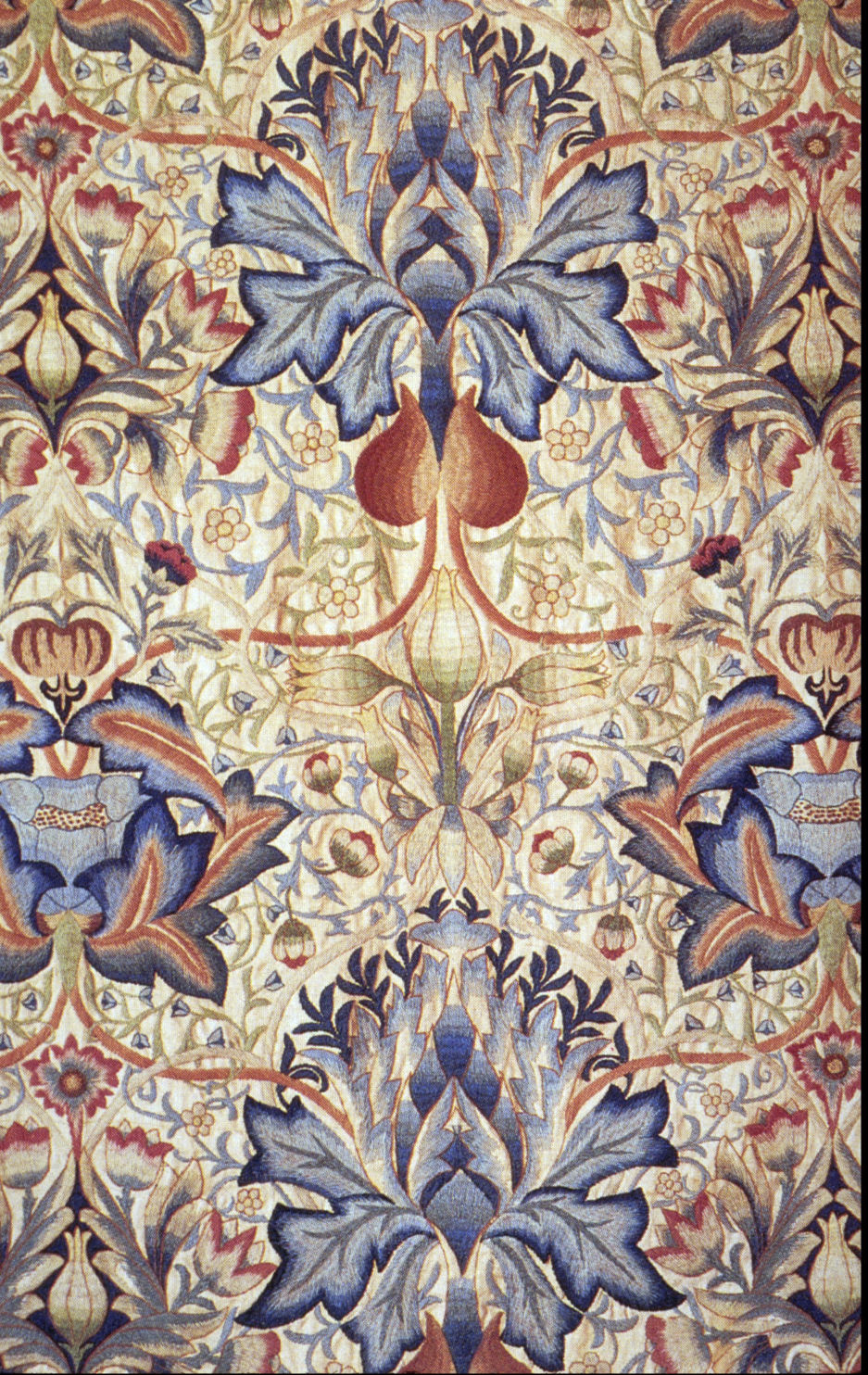
Acanthus embroidered panel, designed Morris, 1890

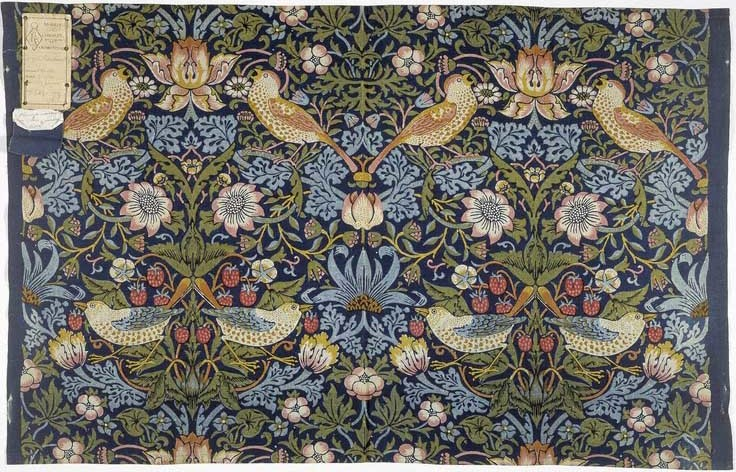
Strawberry Thief, furnishing fabric, designed Morris, 1883

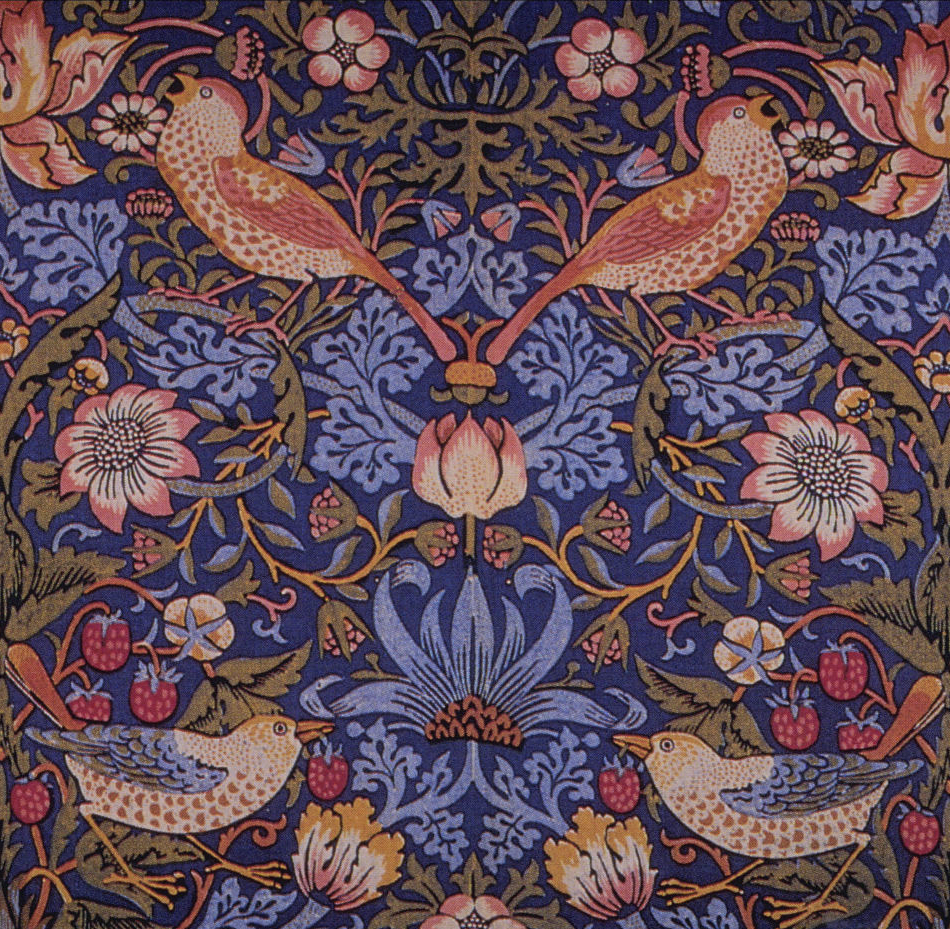
Morris Strawberry Thief 1883 detail

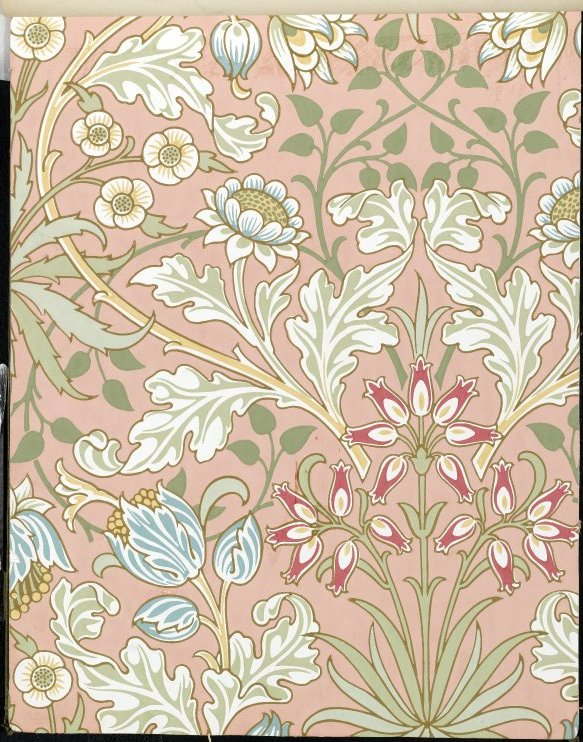
Wallpaper – Hyacinth, pattern #480 – 1915–1917

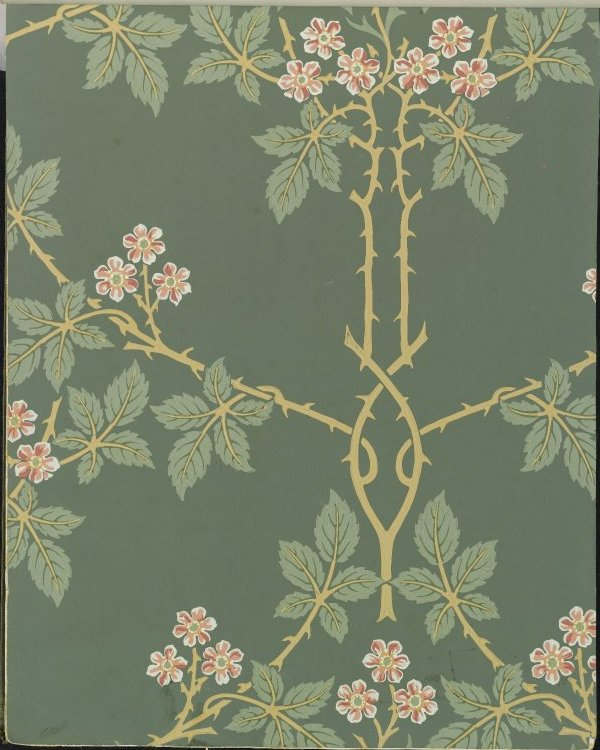
Wallpaper – Blackberry, pattern #388 – 1915–1917

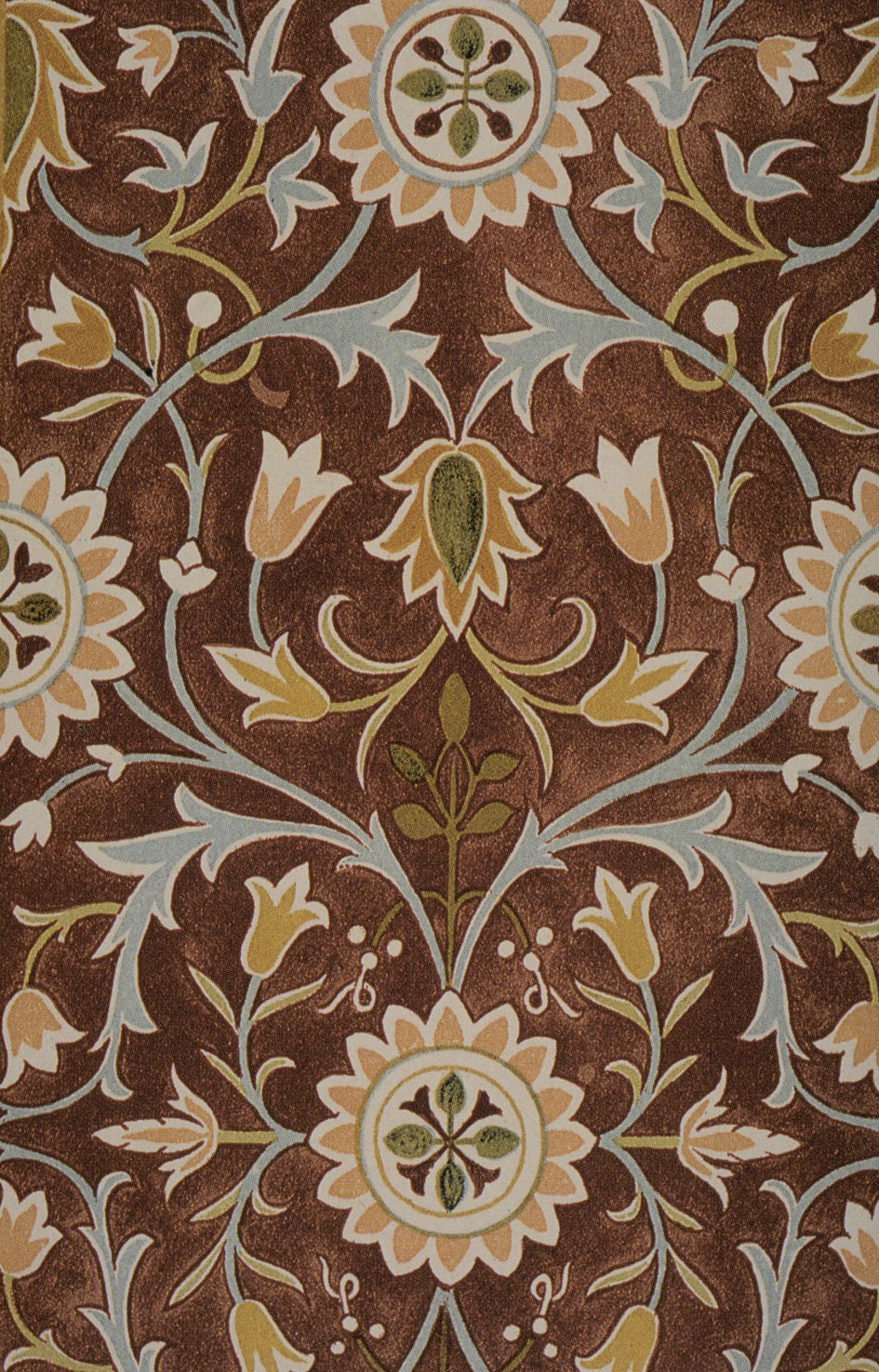
Detail of a watercolour design for the Little Flower carpet showing a portion of the central medallion, by William Morris

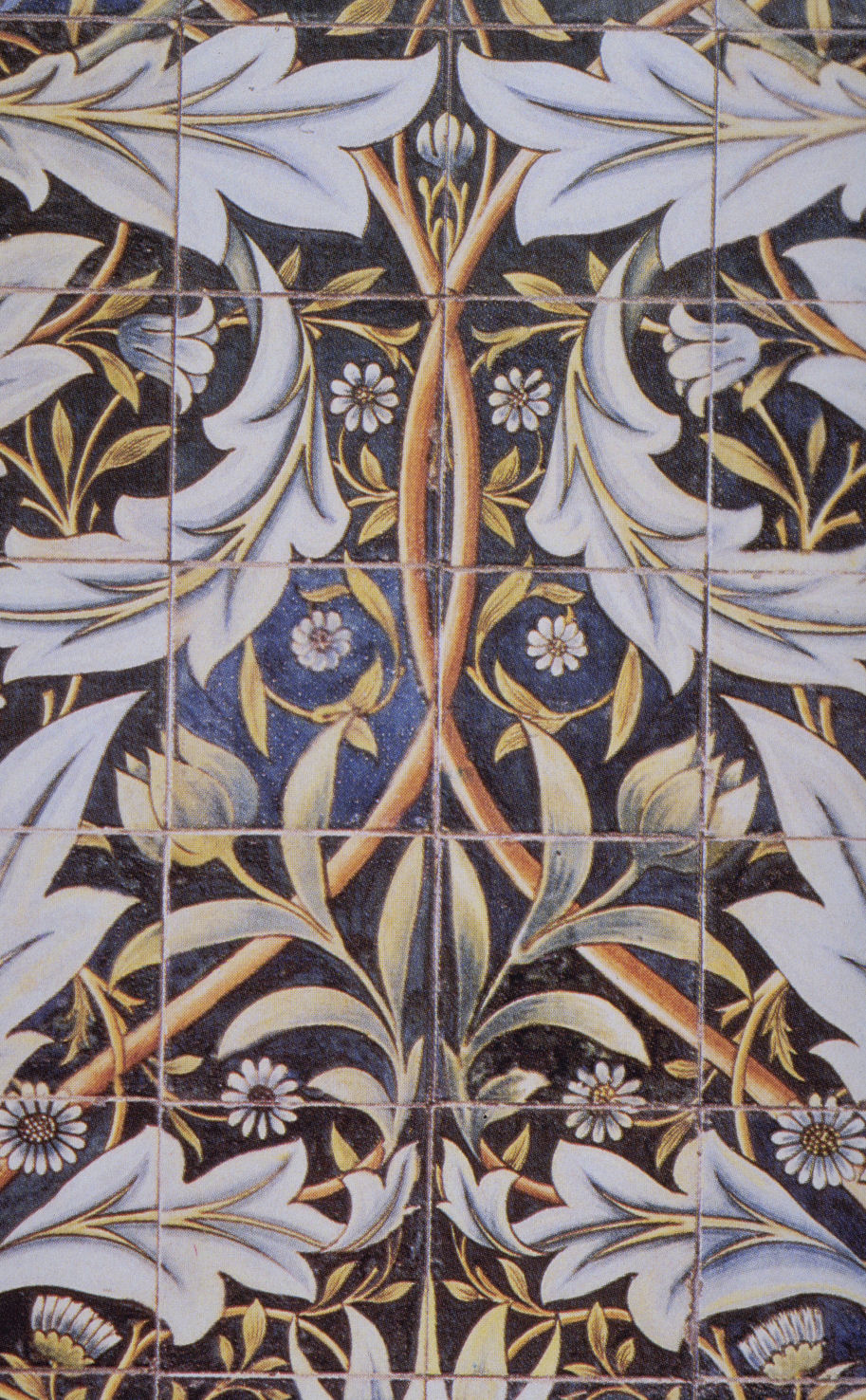
Panel of ceramic tiles designed by Morris and produced by William De Morgan, 1876

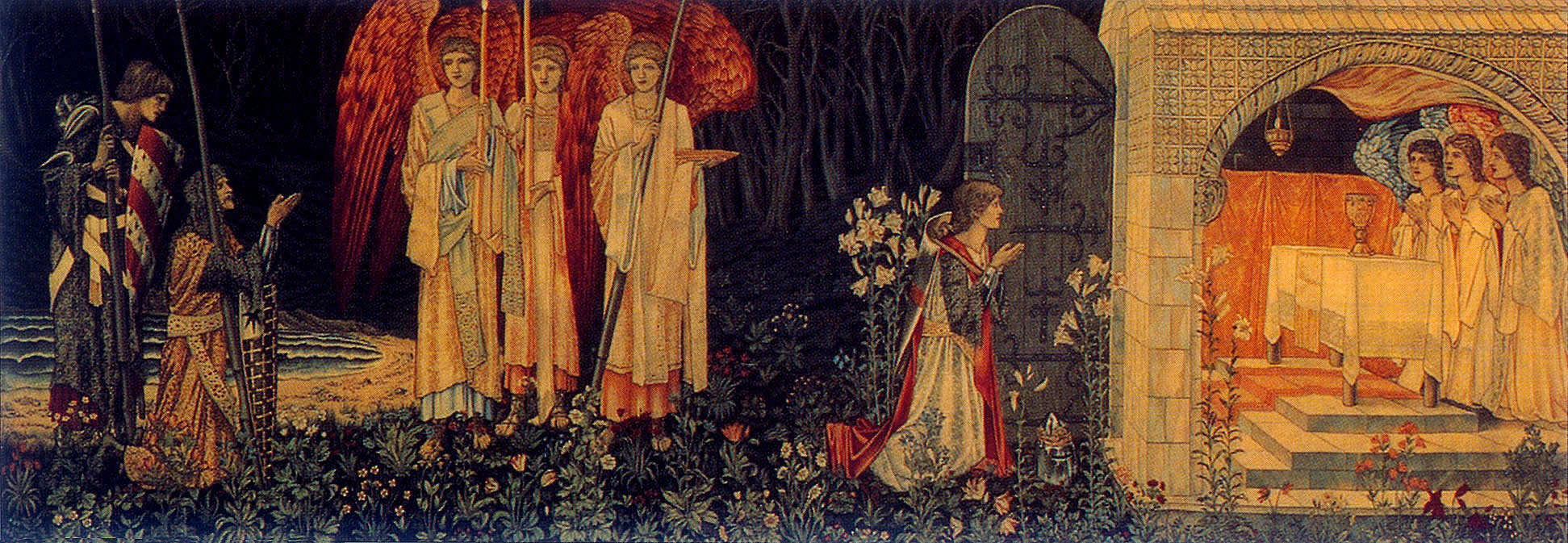
The Vision of the Holy Grail tapestry, 1890

== See also ==
- Merry England
- Robert Steele – medievalist who was a disciple of Morris
- Simple living
- Sydney Cockerell – friend of Morris and secretary of Kelmscott Press
- Victorian decorative arts
- William Morris wallpaper designs
- List of works by the Kelmscott Press
- Anarchism and the arts
