= Mademoiselle Josette, My Woman =

Mademoiselle Josette, My Woman (French: Mademoiselle Josette ma femme) may refer to:

- Mademoiselle Josette, My Woman (play), a 1906 work by Paul Gavault and Robert Charvay
- Mademoiselle Josette, My Woman (1914 film), a French silent film
- Mademoiselle Josette, My Woman (1926 film), a French-German silent film
- Mademoiselle Josette, My Woman (1933 film), a French film
- Mademoiselle Josette, My Woman (1950 film), a French film
