= Boisselot =

Boisselot (French: [bwaslo]) is a French surname and may refer to:

- Charles Boisselot (1784–1851), dramatic artist
- Paul-Louis Boisselot (1829–1905), playwright and vaudeville actor

Members of the large Boisselot family of instrument makers are:

- Antoine Boisselot (?–c. 1780), luthier and tourneur
- Claude Boisselot (1755–?), luthier
- Jean-Louis Boisselot (1782–1847), piano maker and owner of Boisselot & Fils
- Louis Boisselot (1754–1807), luthier and tourneur
- Louis-Constantin Boisselot (1809–1850), piano maker
- Marie-Louis-François Boisselot (1845–1902), piano maker
- Pierre Boisselot (1750–?), luthier and tabletier
- Xavier Boisselot (1811–1893), classical composer and piano maker
