= Jules Lefort =

French lyrical singer of the Victorian era

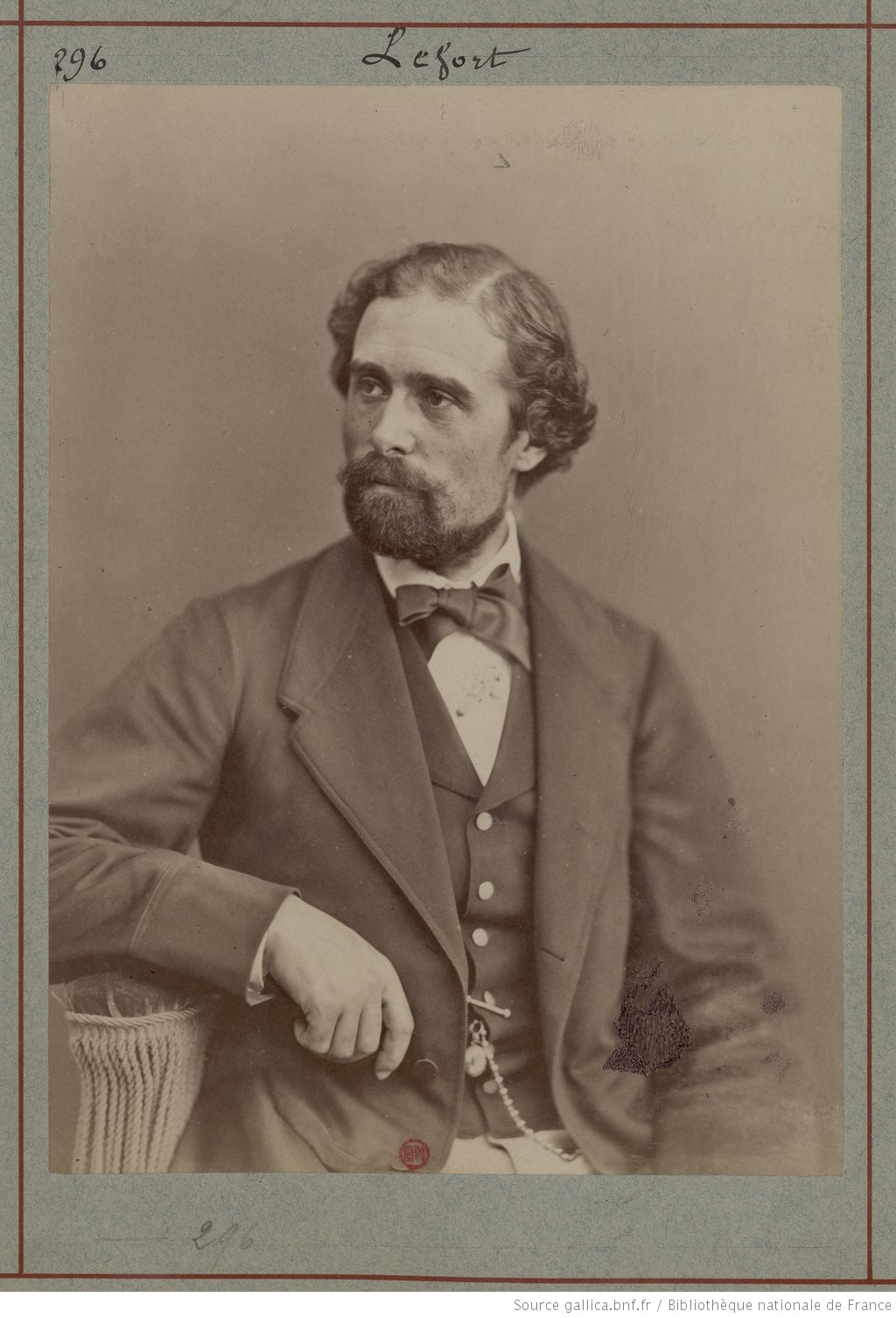
Jules Lefort

Jules Lefort (27 January 1822 – 7 September 1898), was a French lyrical singer of the Victorian era who in a career that spanned three decades regularly sang in the salons of wealthy and aristocratic patrons and in fashionable concert rooms both in Paris and London and across Europe. During his early singing career he was a tenor and a baritone but by the time of his later career in 1871 his voice had lowered to bass.

== Early life ==
Jules François René Lefort was born in Paris in 1822, the son of Jean François Hubert Lefort, a merchant, and Elisabeth Adèle née Dezedde. The family originated from Laboissière-en-Thelle, a commune in the Oise department in northern France. During much of his career Lefort sang mainly in Parisian salons, occasionally venturing further afield to venues across Europe and to London and the British provinces. Kurt Gänzl, the writer on musical theatre, has described him as, "a very clever artist, able to interpret the romances and songs of his age with delicacy and point, with intelligence and expression, in a manner which was highly effective... time and again, he was hailed as the outstanding male singer of romances and ballads in Paris and in London." There is some uncertainty about his vocal range at this stage in his career; his first press notice, in a short article about the Paris Opéra in January 1842 in the Parisian newspaper Les Coulisses, described the 19 year-old Lefort as a new baritone "with a beautiful voice" who, with proper training, would be able to sing tenor. Gänzl believes he was a light baritone. In the next few years he was a regular on the concert platform. By 1846 the musical press was calling him the 'baryton en vogue’, and by November 1846 he was a leading player in the ‘opéra de salon’ - performing operas and musical comedies privately in the homes of aristocrats and the rich.

== Musical career ==
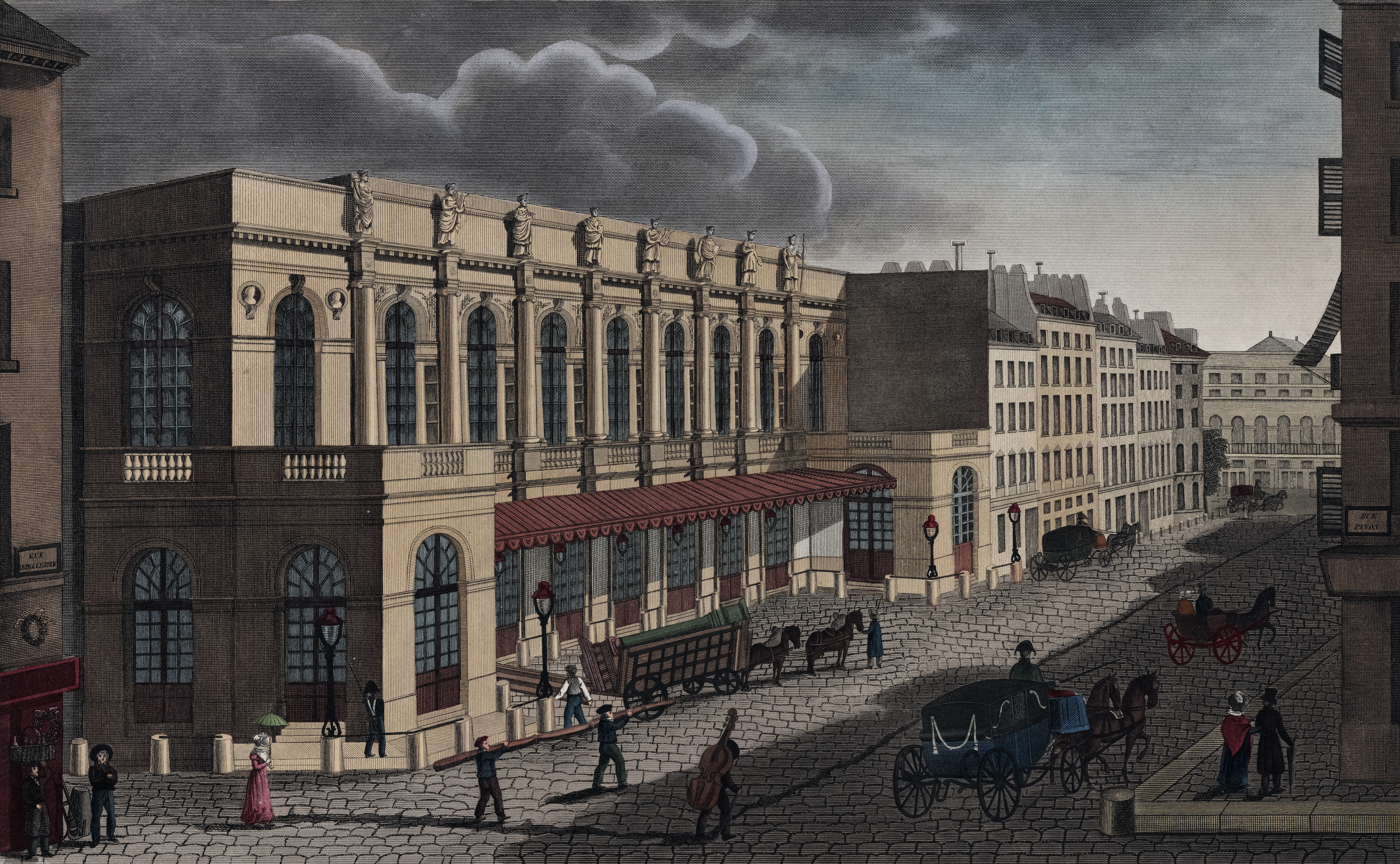
Lefort made his début with the Paris Opéra in 1848 at the Salle Le Peletier

He made his début at the Paris Opéra in 1848 singing the baritone role of Lord Enrico Ashton in Lucie de Lammermoor, and sang don Fadrique in Jeanne la Folle there in the same year. After a number of public performances in Paris, Orléans and Rouen he made his first appearance in London in June 1850 in a concert at Willis’s Rooms. In July 1850 he appeared in a concert with the German pianist and composer Belleville d’Oury, following which the music critic of The Times wrote that Lefort was ‘a French barytone [who] has produced an agreeable sensation in several concerts this season. He has a very agreeable voice, full-toned and flexible, and his singing, which is remarkably unaffected, has all the beauties with none of the ordinary defects of the French school’. Days later music publishers in London had printed and were selling various numbers ‘sung with so much success by M Lefort at Mme Oury’s concert’. After a brief return to Paris Lefort was back in London where, during October 1850, he appeared in a month long series of concerts under Michael William Balfe, the musical director and principal conductor at Her Majesty's Theatre. In May 1853 Lefort returned to London for a series of concerts before recrossing the Channel to appear at venues across Europe. In September 1854 Lefort sang before Prince Albert at Boulogne. During this period he became known for singing En avant les zouaves!, a song by Jules Verne to a score by Alfred Dufresne and published by Ledentu in 1855. On 27 June 1856 Lefort and his partner Pierre Levassor gave the first performance in London of Offenbach's Les deux aveugles in a concert version at the Hanover Square Rooms. In the same year he sang in Tout est bien qui finit bien before the Emperor Napoleon III and the Empress Eugénie at the Tuileries Palace; while shortly after he sang before Queen Victoria.

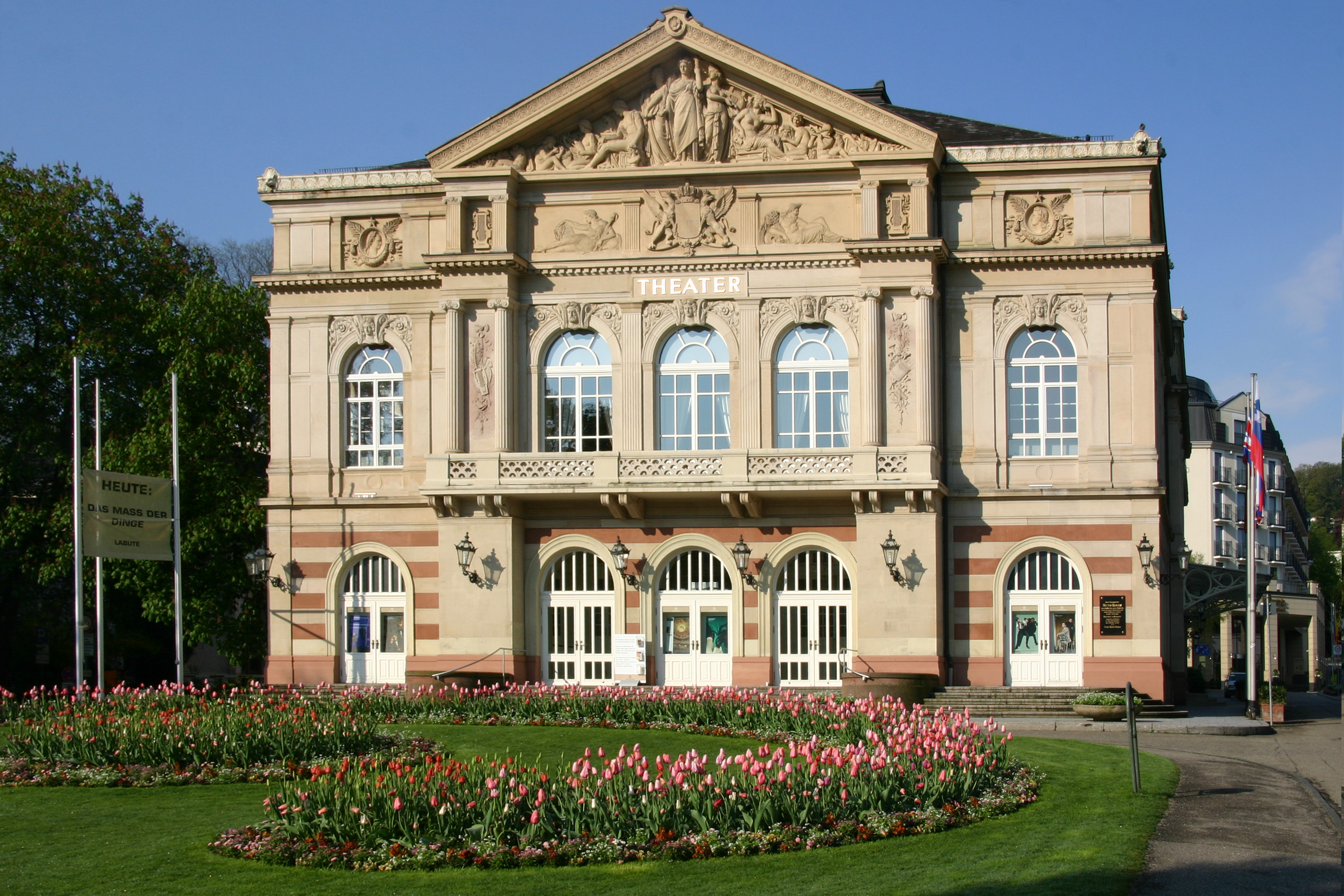
Lefort sang the role of Claudio in the first performance of Berlioz's Béatrice et Bénédict at the Theater Baden-Baden (1862)

Lefort created roles in several salon operas, including Felix in Jean-Baptiste Weckerlin's Tout est bien qui finit bien (1856); in Pauline Thys's l’Héritier sans le savoir (1858), and in Jules Beer's comic opera En état de siège (1859). In November 1858 Lefort introduced what was to become one of his most famous songs in the scena ‘Le Paradis perdu’, to music by Théodore Ritter and lyrics by Baron Darou de Coubaltes. When Hector Berlioz first performed fragments from his work-in-progress Les Troyens at the Parisian Beethoven Society he chose Lefort and Anne Charton-Demeur to sing in the demonstration. In August 1859, when Berlioz gave the first public performance of pieces from Les Troyens at a concert, Jules Lefort sang the role of Chorèbe to the Cassandre of Pauline Viardot Garcia, and with her performed the Didon and Énée duet ‘O nuit d’ivresse'. In a concert in 1860 he sang 'Song to the Evening Star' from Tannhäuser by Richard Wagner, while at the Théâtre Lyrique in 1861 he played the title role in Henry Boisseaux and Théodore Lajarte's Le Neveu de Gulliver but the piece was not a success and Lefort turned his back on dramatic works for the rest of his career, returning to salon singing. He was Claudio in the premiere in the Theater Baden-Baden of Béatrice et Bénédict (1862) by Hector Berlioz, under the direction of the composer. In 1862 he sang the title role of the King of Cocagne in Pauline Thys's le Pays de Cocagne. He appeared in Jules d'Aoust's one-act comic opera Une partie de dominos (1863). In 1866 Lefort was singing in Berlin, in Spain and toured Europe in a concert party alongside the operatic soprano Carlotta Patti, the Belgian composer and violinist Henri Vieuxtemps, the Dutch composer and cellist Alexandre Batta and the pianist Eugène Ketterer.

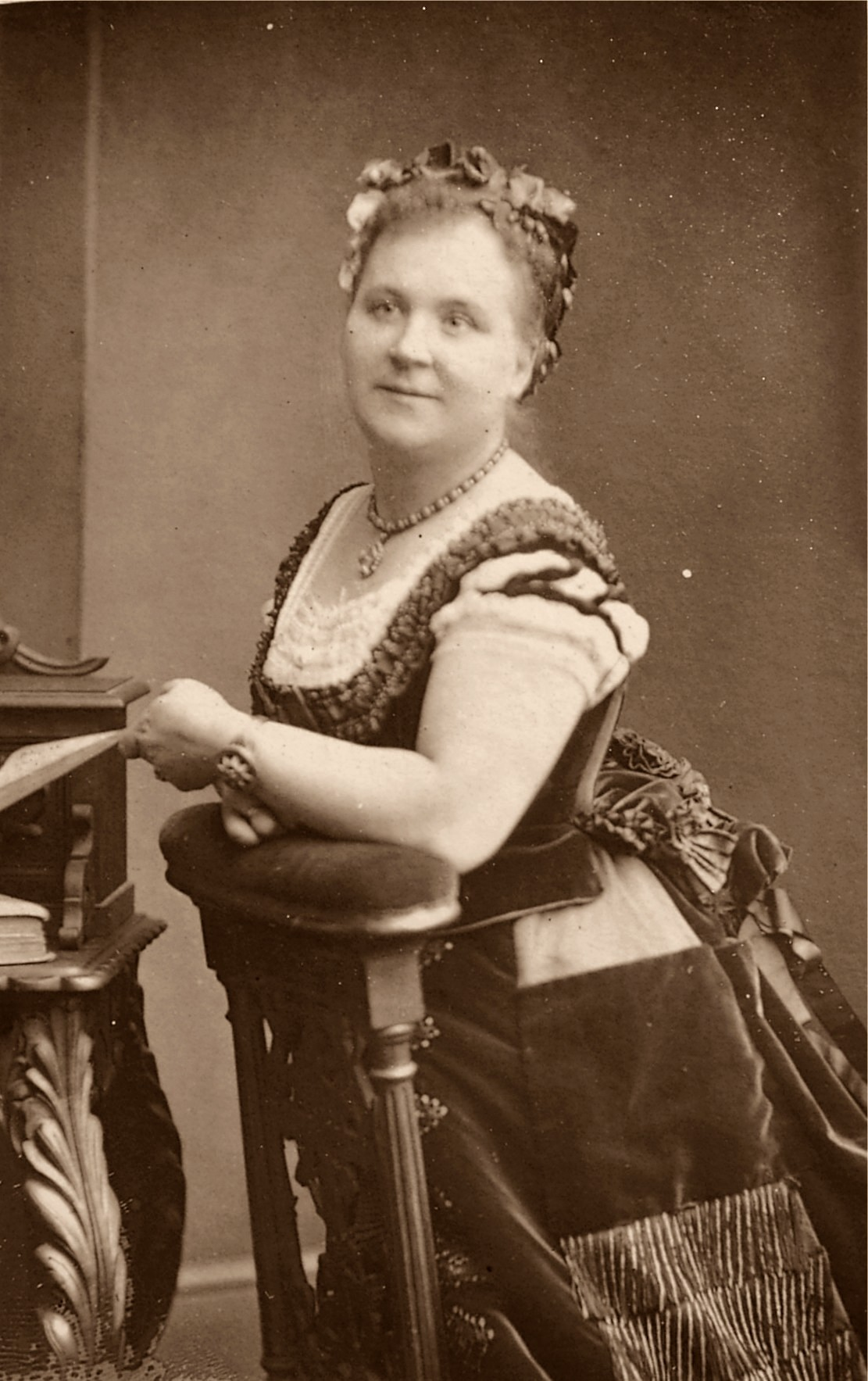
Lefort toured successfully for several seasons with Helen Lemmens-Sherrington from 1871

In June 1867 Lefort was back in London where he sang at a state concert before Queen Victoria at Buckingham Palace. At the same concert Charles Gounod gave his ‘Chanson de printemps’, and Lefort sang the duet 'Je suis alsacienne, je suis alsacien' from Offenbach’s Lischen et Fritzchen with Amélie Deméric-Lablache, joining in the quintet from Cosi fan tutte. A further tour commenced in 1868 with the soprano Carlotta Patti, the violinist Henri Vieuxtemps, the French actor and singer Jean-François Berthelier and the Belgian harpist Félix Godefroid. In March 1871 in London Lefort made his first appearance with the Royal Philharmonic Society, while later that year he made an extensive concert tour with Helen Lemmens-Sherrington and her husband, Jacques-Nicolas Lemmens and Sherrington’s sister, the soprano Jose Sherrington, together with the tenor Nelson Varley and the violinist Alexandre Cornelis. Following the success of the tour the Lemmenses and Lefort appeared together for several further seasons with their repertoire including a performance of Rossini's Stabat Mater in which Lefort sang the bass part. In London in June 1872 before the Emperor Napoleon III and the Empress Eugénie he sang opposite Marie Dumas in her Une soirée perdue to a score by Pauline Viardot.

After a few final performances in London and Paris in about 1875 he became a singing teacher in Paris, and was the author of De l'émission de la voix (1868), Méthode de Chant (1874) and Grammaire de la parole (1891).

Jules Lefort died in Paris aged 76.

== Personal life ==
Jules Lefort married three times: firstly, in 1848 to Charlotte Jeanne Judlin (1820 – 1883); they divorced in December 1872. Their son Pierre Louis Adrien Lefort (1856 – 1925), who, under the nom de plume Robert Charvay, was a journalist, playwright and lyricist of opérettes. Secondly, in 1883 he married Célinie Zénaïde Dupont (1829 – 1892). Lastly, in 1896 he married Victoria Caroline Gum (1859 -).
