= Boisselot & Fils =

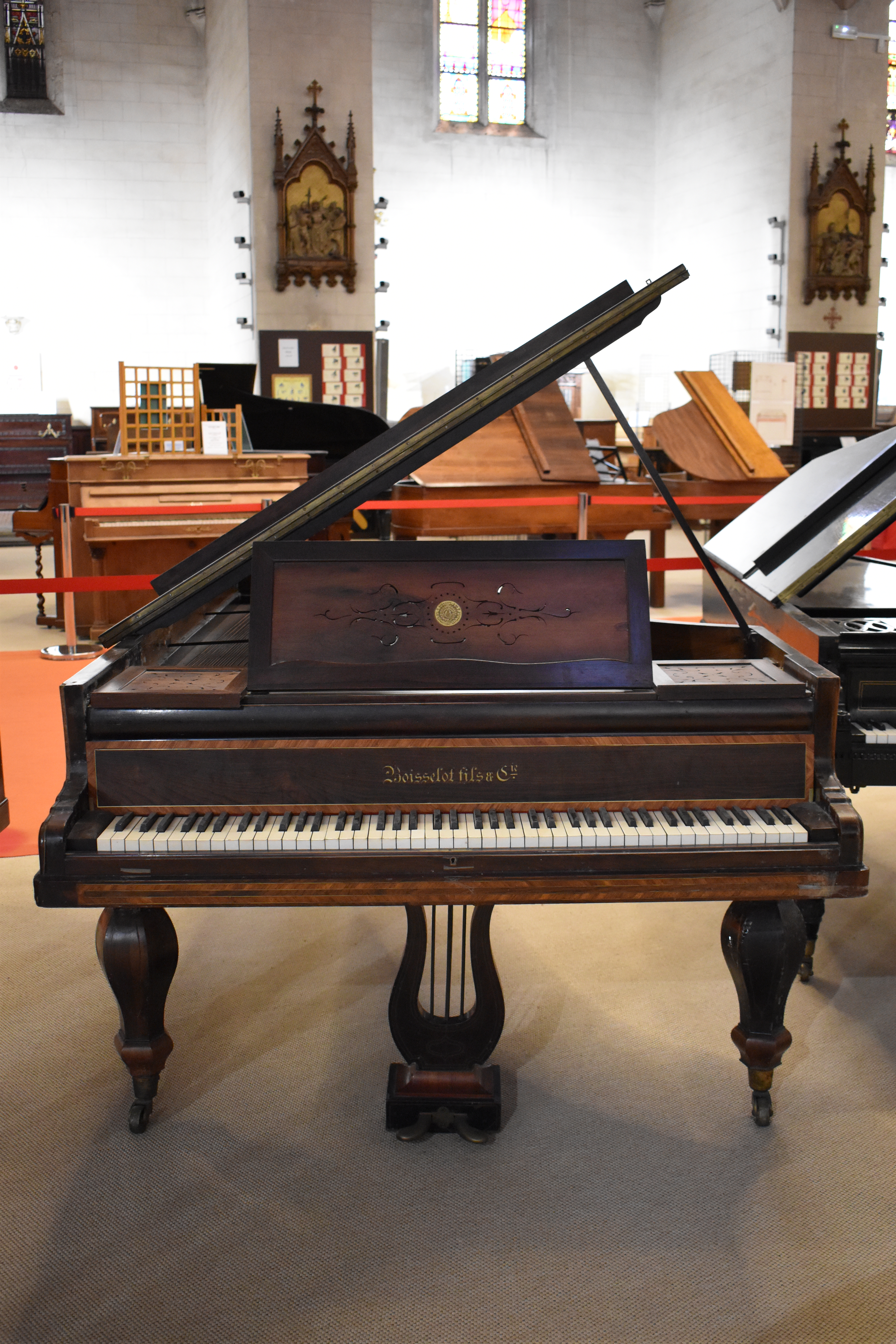
A Boisselot & Fils piano

Boisselot & Fils (French: [bwaslo e fis]) was a French piano manufacturing company established in 1831 in Marseille, France, by Jean-Louis Boisselot and sons, Louis-Constantin Boisselot and Xavier Boisselot. The rapid increase in the production capacity of the factory with 70 workers to 300 pianos per year from 1834 shows that father and son had prepared their case carefully. The constant expansion led in 1848 with 150 workers for the production of about 400 pianos a year. Highlighting this success, he was awarded with a gold medal at the French Industrial Exposition of 1844 (the 10th Paris Industrial Exhibition). Among other innovations Boisselot presented for the first time at the exhibition a mechanism by which individual notes and sounds were identified as Tonhalte or sostenuto pedal today.

The choice of Marseille as the location of such a factory had proved wise: Boisselot & Fils was in the 1840s one of the largest piano factory in France. The geographical location offered advantages: lower costs for workers, inexpensive availability of exotic woods over the harbor, easier access to export markets in Spain, Italy and in the French colonies.

In 1847, the company founded an office in Barcelona. After his father's death, Louis Constantin, who survived his father for only three years, led the company on his own. His death undertook his brother Xavier to resume his career as a composer in Paris and take over the management of the company in 1850. In 1865 Xavier handed over the management of the company to his nephew Franz Boisselot (1845-1908), the son of Louis Constantine, named after his godfather Liszt. Franz led the Boisselot & Fils from 1893, when it was re-established as Manufacture Marseillaise de pianos until his death in 1908, having the First World War brought the company to an end.
