= List of works by the Kelmscott Press =

List of books published by the Kelmscott Press (1891-1898)

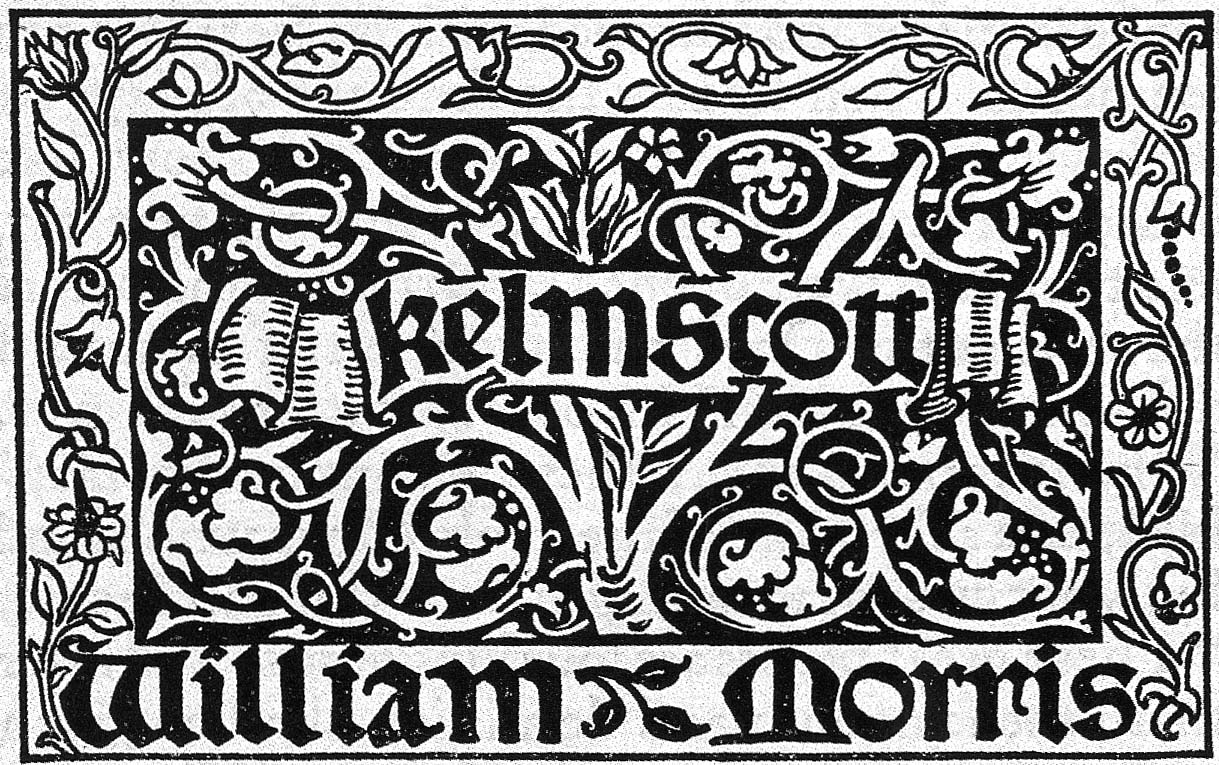
Colophon of Kelmscott Press

This is a list of books that were published by the Kelmscott Press. They are taken from the Chronological List of the Books Printed at the Kelmscott Press and A Note by William Morris on His Aims in Founding the Kelmscott Press. Titles with no listed author are by William Morris.

== 1891 ==
- The Story of the Glittering Plain.
- Poems By the Way.

== 1892 ==
- The Love-Lyrics and Songs of Proteus, Wilfrid Scawen Blunt.
- The Nature of Gothic, John Ruskin.
- The Defence of Guenevere.
- A Dream of John Ball.
- The Golden Legend, Jacobus de Voragine.
- The Recuyell of the Historyes of Troye, Raoul Lefèvre; trans. William Caxton; ed. H. Halliday Sparling.
- Biblia Innocentium, J. W. Mackail.

== 1893 ==
- The History of Reynard the Foxe, William Caxton; ed. H. Halliday Sparling.
- The Poems of William Shakespeare ed. F.S. Ellis.
- News from Nowhere.
- The Order of Chivalry, trans. Caxton; ed. F. S. Ellis.
- The Life of Thomas Wolsey, Cardinal Archbishop of York, George Cavendish; ed. F. S. Ellis.
- The History of Godefrey of Boloyne and of the Conquest of Iherusalem, William of Tyre; ed. H. Halliday Sparling.
- Utopia, Thomas More; ed. F. S. Ellis.
- Maud: A Monodrama, Alfred Tennyson.
- Gothic Architecture: A Lecture for the Arts and Crafts Exhibition Society.
- Sidonia the Sorceress, William Meinhold; trans. Jane Wilde.
- Ballads and Narrative Poems, D. G. Rossetti.
- The Tale of King Florus and the Fair Jehane; trans. Morris.

== 1894 ==
- The Story of the Glittering Plain.
- Of the Friendship of Amis and Amile, trans. Morris.
- Sonnets and Lyrical Poems, D.G. Rossetti.
- The Poems of John Keats, ed. F.S. Ellis.
- Atlanta in Calydon: A Tragedy, A.C. Swinburne.
- The Tale of the Emperor of Coustans and of Over the Sea, translated from Old French by Morris.
- The Wood Beyond the World.
- The Book of Wisdom and Lies, Sulkhan-Saba Orbeliani, trans. Oliver Wardrop
- The Poetical Works of Percy Bysshe Shelley, ed. F.S. Ellis.
- Psalmi Penitentiales, ed. F.S. Ellis.
- Epistola de Contemptu Mundi Di Frate Hieronymo [Salvonarola] da Ferrara, ed. C.F. Murray.

== 1895 ==
- The Tale of Beowulf, trans. A. J. Wyatt and Morris.
- The Poetical Works of Percy Bysshe Shelley, Volume II.
- Syr Perecyvelle of Gales, ed. F. S. Ellis.
- The Life and Death of Jason: A Poem.
- The Story of the Child Christopher and Goldilind the Fair.
- The Poetical Works of Percy Bysshe Shelley, Volume III.
- Hand and Soul, D. G. Rossetti.

== 1896 ==
- Poems Chosen out of the Works of Robert Herrick ed. F. S. Ellis.
- Poems Chosen Out of the Works of Samuel Taylor Coleridge ed. F. S. Ellis.
- The Well At the World's End.
- The Works of Geoffrey Chaucer.
- The Earthly Paradise. Volume I.
- Laudes Beatae Mariae Virginis ed. S. C. Cockerell.
- The Earthly Paradise. Volume II.
- The Floure and the Leafe, ed. F. S. Ellis.
- The Shepheardes Calendar, Edmund Spenser; ed. F. S. Ellis.
- The Earthly Paradise. Volume III.

== 1897 ==
- The Story of Sigurd.
- The Earthly Paradise. Volume IV.
- The Earthly Paradise. Volume V.
- The Earthly Paradise. Volume VI.
- The Earthly Paradise. Volume VII.
- The Water of the Wondrous Isles.
- The Earthly Paradise. Volume VIII.
- Syr Ysambrace, ed. F. S. Ellis.
- Sire Degrevaunt, ed. F. S. Ellis.

== 1898 ==
- Some German Woodcuts of the Fifteenth Century, ed. S. C. Cockerell.
- The Story of Sigurd the Volsung and the Fall of the Niblungs.
- The Sundering Flood.
- Love is Enough, or the of Freeing Pharamond: A Morality.
- A Note by William Morris on His Aims in Founding the Kelmscott Press.
