= Mademoiselle Josette, My Woman (1933 film) =

1933 film

- Directed by: André Berthomieu
- Written by: André Berthomieu
- Based on: Mademoiselle Josette, My Woman by Robert Charvay and Paul Gavault
- Starring: Annabella; Jean Murat; Edith Méra
- Cinematography: Jean Bachelet; Jean Isnard
- Music by: Georges Van Parys
- Production company: Films de France
- Distributed by: Films de France; Cinélax
- Release date: 7 April 1933
- Running time: 84 minutes
- Country: France
- Language: French

Mademoiselle Josette, My Woman (French: Mademoiselle Josette, ma femme) is a 1933 French comedy film directed by André Berthomieu and starring Annabella, Jean Murat and Edith Méra. It is based on the 1906 play of the same title by Robert Charvay and Paul Gavault. Berthomieu himself remade the film in 1950.

The film is the first sound film version of the play.

== Cast ==
- Annabella as Josette
- Jean Murat as André Ternay
- Edith Méra as Myrianne
- Jean Marconi as Valorbier
- Victor Garland as Joe Jackson
- Gaston Mauger as Dupré
- Blanche Denège as Madame Dupré
- Henri Trévoux as Le directeur
- Pierre Etchepare as Panard
- Jean Diéner as Dutilleul
- Arletty
- Jacques Pills
- Georges Tabet
- Paul Velsa as Prosper

== Reception ==
A review noted that Berthomieu had tried to translate "the iridescences of the character trough visual means".

== Bibliography ==
- James L. Limbacher. Haven't I seen you somewhere before?: Remakes, sequels, and series in motion pictures and television, 1896-1978. Pierian Press, 1979.
