= The Amber Witch (opera) =

Opera composed by William Vincent Wallace

- Opera by William Vincent Wallace
- The composer between 1855 and 1860
- Librettist: Henry Fothergill Chorley
- Based on: Maria Schweidler: Die Bernsteinhexe by Johannes Wilhelm Meinhold
- Premiere: 28 February 1861; Her Majesty's Theatre, London

The Amber Witch is an opera in four acts composed by William Vincent Wallace to an English libretto by Henry Fothergill Chorley, after Lady Duff-Gordon's translation of Meinold's Maria Schweidler: Die Bernsteinhexe.

It premiered at Her Majesty's Theatre, London on 28 February 1861 conducted by Charles Hallé with Helen Lemmens-Sherrington in the title role.

== Background and performance history ==
The libretto was based on a Gothic novel by Johann Wilhelm Meinhold, Maria Schweidler die Bernsteinhexe, which had been translated into English by Lady Duff-Gordon and published in 1844 as The Amber Witch. The work was very popular in Victorian England and had gone through several editions by the time Wallace chose it as the subject for his fourth and most ambitious opera. The novel, unlike the opera is on which it was based, retained its popularity and continued to be published both on its own and in anthologies into the 21st century. It was a favourite of Oscar Wilde's when he was a boy, and in 1895 it was published in a luxury edition illustrated by Philip Burne-Jones.

Helen Lemmens-Sherrington who created the title role in The Amber Witch

Wallace had sketched out most of the opera in the US in the mid-1850s, having had the libretto by Chorley to hand for some years, but difficulties in the London theatres held up its production in the capital. Having completed the orchestration of the work at Wiesbaden in 1860, the opera finally premiered at Her Majesty's Theatre on 28 February 1861 with Charles Hallé conducting. The Times reported that the first night's performance was a success and that "the music is almost as complicated as it is beautiful". Wallace considered it his best opera, and Queen Victoria attended one of the early performances, but it met with only mixed success with audiences. After its run at Her Majesty's Theatre, it transferred to the Theatre Royal Drury Lane with most of the original cast, including Charles Santley. (Euphrosyne Parepa-Rosa replaced Helen Lemmens-Sherrington in the title role.) Santley recalled in his memoirs that although The Amber Witch contained some fine music, it played to nearly empty houses at Drury Lane.

In 1866 at a concert to raise funds for Wallace's widow and children, two members of the original cast, Helen Lemmens-Sherrington and John Patey, sang three pieces from the Amber Witch – "Hark! How the chimes", "When the elves at dawn do pass" and "My Long Hair Is Braided". The opera was revived in London in the 1880s and again in 1899 by the Moody-Manners touring company. The latter revival was quite a success, and the opera remained in the Moody-Manners repertoire for several years, and received very worthwhile reviews in its many showings throughout the UK (incl. two performances in Dublin). Like most of Wallace's operas, it then sank into obscurity, although Mary's aria was a popular concert piece for a time and selections from the opera (arranged for organ) were played at New York's Chickering Hall in December 1886.

== Roles ==
Role	Voice type	Premiere Cast, 28 February 1861 (Conductor: Charles Hallé)
Mary	soprano	Helen Lemmens-Sherrington
Elsie	contralto	Fanny Huddart
Count Rudiger of Ravenstein	tenor	Sims Reeves
Commandant	baritone	Charles Santley
Pastor	bass	John Patey
Claus	tenor	William Terrott
King	bass	Thomas Bartleman

== Synopsis ==
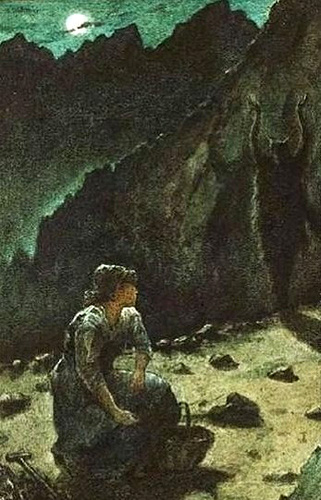
Apparition on the Streckelberg, by Philip Burne-Jones for the 1895 edition of Meinhold's The Amber Witch on which Wallace's opera is based

The opera is set in the island of Usedom in 17th-century Pomerania (now Germany/Poland) during The Thirty Years War and tells the story of Mary, the "Amber Witch" of the title, and the daughter of the local pastor, Abraham Schweidler. She has discovered a vein of amber on the Streckelberg hill outside her village of Koserow. She uses it to buy food and clothes for the starving villagers, but tells no one of the source of her apparent wealth.

Count Rudiger of Ravenstein falls in love with her and woos her disguised as a peasant. However, the local Commandant is also in love with her. When Mary spurns his affections and chooses Rudiger, the Commandant contrives with the aid of his jealous servant Elsie, the leader of a local witch coven, to have Mary accused of witchcraft and imprisoned. In a dramatic trial scene (Act 3, Sc. 3), Mary confesses, to save her distraught father from further pain, and is condemned to die at the stake. Count Rudiger, also imprisoned by order of the Commandant, escapes and rescues Mary as she is about to be tied to the stake, and the young lovers are reunited when the King pardons Mary and orders that her accuser take her place. Elsie, however, is found dead at the foot of the stake, having taken poison administered by her erstwhile accomplice, the Commandant, and he in turn is disgraced and banished by order of the King.

== Main arias and ensembles ==
- Prelude to Act 1 (Orchestra)
- 'The conquered foe is flying' (Opening Chorus, Mary, Elsie)
- 'Good eve, my gentle father' (Mary, Count Rudiger, and the pastor)
- 'O never laugh, Sir Knight' (Mary)
- 'Hark! How the chimes' (Mary, Count Rudiger, and the pastor)
- 'Do you want a letter?' – (Claus)
- 'A soldier must forever war be waging' (The commandant)
- 'Haughty maid' (The commandant)
- 'O bright is the palace dome' (Count Rudiger)
- 'Go sing how our troup was the first in war' (Count Rudiger and chorus)
- 'My long hair is braided' (Mary)
- 'Did I hear him called to ride' (Quintet, Mary and principals)
- Finale, Act 1 - March & Chorus 'Champion of Liberty (Ensemble)
- Introduction Act 2; 'Up the hill, where meteors guide' (Chorus, Elsie)
- 'O Lady Moon! on silver clouds reclining' (Mary and Count Rudiger)
- 'Love me and fear not I fail thee' (Count Rudiger)
- ' 'Till life at last be over' (Mary and Count Rudiger)
- Scene 'To yonder withered oak' Finale (Elsie, Chorus)
- Introduction, Act 3; 'Mary, Mary, up awake' (Chorus)
- 'The pain of Earth's most cruel wrong' (The commandant and the pastor)
- 'When the elves at dawn do pass' (Mary)
- Trio 'Melted is the frost that bound her' (Commandant, Pastor, Mary)
- Finale 'There she is, the sorceress' (Trial Scene, Ensemble)
- Introduction, Act 4 (Grand Scena, Rudiger)
- 'Lone, oppressed, in prison lying' (Count Rudiger)
- 'Come away, come away' (Count Rudiger and chorus)
- Duet 'Paid, paid, too long delay'd?' (Elsie and the commandant)
- 'Flos perpetuus rosarum' (Latin hymn) (Mary)
- Scene & Chorus 'Mock her not' (Mary, Pastor, Commandant, Chorus)
- 'I Stand Beside My Grave (Mary)
- Soldiers' Chorus 'The tyrant shall wake'
- Scene (Rudiger, King, Mary)
- Rondo-Finale 'O am I dreaming still?' (Mary)

== Recordings ==
There is no recording of the complete opera. Recorded excerpts include:

- the orchestral Prelude to Act 1, on the album British Opera Overtures, performed by Victorian Opera Orchestra, Richard Bonynge (cond.), on: Somm Célèste SOMMCD 0123, CD (2013).
- the aria My Long Hair is Braided, on the album The Power of Love: British Opera Arias, performed by Deborah Riedel, Australian Opera and Ballet Orchestra, Richard Bonynge (cond.), on: Melba 301082, CD (2000).
- the arias My Long Hair is Braided and Haughty Maid, my Passion Scorning, on the album Europe Day Concert, Live from St. John's Smith Square, London 9 May 2013, performed by Dáire Halpin (soprano), Martin Piskorski (tenor), European Union Youth Orchestra, Laurent Pillot (cond.), on: Classical Recording Company CRC 2309, CD (2013).

There was also a non-commercial concert performance of excerpts with piano accompaniment (10 November 2008) with the ensuing issue of a small number of CDs at the National Library of Ireland, Dublin. The title of the CD is Gems of Irish Opera vol. 1. It contains the extended love scene-duet beginning O Lady Moon from Act 2, performed by Aoife O'Sullivan (soprano), Dean Power (tenor), Una Hunt (piano).

== Sources ==
- Arundale, David, Recording Review: Power of Love: British Opera Arias, MusicWeb International, October 2002.
- Beale, Robert, Charles Hallé: a musical life, Ashgate Publishing, Ltd., 2007, p. 126. ISBN 0-7546-6137-7
- Bleiler, Everett Franklin (ed.), Five Victorian Ghost Novels, Courier Dover Publications, 1971. ISBN 0-486-22558-5
- Dwight, John Sullivan, Dwight's Journal of Music, 13 April 1861, p. 13.
- Flood, W. H. Grattan, William Vincent Wallace: A Memoir, Published at the offices of The Waterford News, 1912.
- Krehbiel, Henry Edward, Review of the New York Musical Season 1886-1887, originally published in 1887 and published in a facsimile edition by BiblioBazaar, 2008, p. 60. ISBN 0-559-65560-6
- Mapleson, James Henry, The Mapleson Memoirs, 1848-1888, Belford, Clarke & Co., 1888
- The Musical World, "Wallace Memorial Fund", 6 January 1866, p. 12.
- New York Times, "An old and famous story", 17 March 1895, p. 31.
- The Players, A Dramatic, Musical and Literary Journal, 9 March 1861, p. 283.
- Santley, Charles, Student and Singer: The Reminiscences of Charles Santley, originally published in 1892 and published in a facsimile edition by BiblioBazaar, 2008, p. 189. ISBN 0-559-00856-2
- Wilde, Oscar Complete shorter fiction with notes and introduction by Isobel Murray, Oxford University Press, 1998. ISBN 0-19-283376-6
