= Mademoiselle Josette, My Woman (1926 film) =

1926 film

- Directed by: Gaston Ravel
- Written by: Hans Jacoby; Tony Lekain
- Based on: Mademoiselle Josette, My Woman by Robert Charvay and Paul Gavault
- Starring: Dolly Davis; Livio Pavanelli; Ágnes Eszterházy
- Cinematography: Otto Kanturek
- Production companies: Alga Films; Films de France
- Distributed by: Filmhaus Bruckmann (Germany); Pathé (France)
- Release date: 9 September 1926
- Countries: France; Germany
- Languages: Silent; French/German intertitles

Mademoiselle Josette, My Woman (French: Mademoiselle Josette ma femme, German: Fräulein Josette - Meine Frau) is a 1926 French-German silent film directed by Gaston Ravel and starring Dolly Davis, Livio Pavanelli and Ágnes Eszterházy. It is based on the 1906 play of the same title by Robert Charvay and Paul Gavault.

It was shot at the Staaken Studios in Berlin and on location in Nice and at Lake Geneva. The film's sets were designed by the art directors Tony Lekain and Hermann Warm.

== Cast ==
- Dolly Davis as Josette
- Livio Pavanelli as André Ternay
- Ágnes Eszterházy as Myrianne
- André Roanne as Joë Jackson
- Sylvio De Pedrelli as Miguel de Paranagua
- Adolphe Engers as Panard
- Guy Ferrant
- Hugo Flink
- Clementine Plessner
- Eduard von Winterstein
- Maria West

== Reception ==
Paimann's Filmlisten summarized: "The film has certain qualities: it is well cast, neatly presented and photographed, and features a number of beautiful landscapes. The subject matter of the film in question could only be gleaned from the motifs, not the dialogue, for which an extremely brisk directorial pace could have provided an equivalent. However, the director, who otherwise worked very carefully, failed to achieve this. A number of very witty titles are pleasantly noticeable."

== Bibliography ==
- James L. Limbacher. Haven't I seen you somewhere before?: Remakes, sequels, and series in motion pictures and television, 1896-1978. Pierian Press, 1979.
