= Manuel Inocêncio Liberato dos Santos =

Portuguese composer

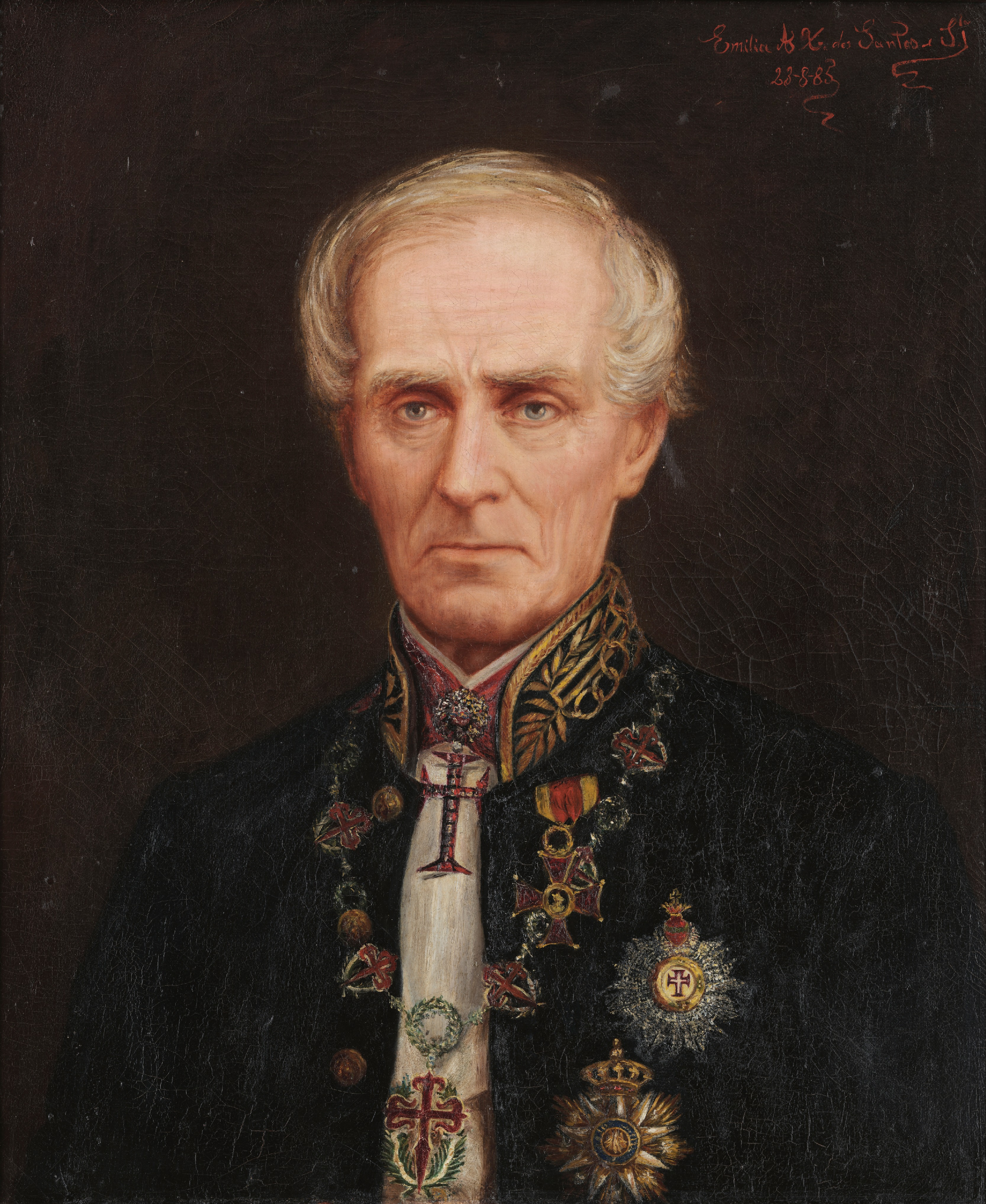
- Born: 23 August 1802; Lisbon, Portugal
- Died: 11 November 1887 (aged 85); Lisbon, Portugal
- Occupation: Musician

Manuel Inocêncio Liberato dos Santos de Carvalho e Silva (23 August 1802 – 11 November 1887) was a Portuguese musician who both composed and performed. He was a Fidalgo of the Royal Household and a Knight of the Order of Christ.

== Personal life ==
Manuel was born and died in Lisbon, Portugal. He fathered nine children, with Rita Ceríaca Joaquina Chaves da Fonseca e Silva, an aristocrat.

== Career ==
As a composer, Manuel was frequently present in the circle of King Luiz I and performed for Portuguese nobility. He combined the post of organist and master of the Royal House of Infants. In recognition, Queen Maria II presented him the Boisselot grand piano that Liszt had played. His father Manuel Inocêncio de Carvalho was a musician for the Royal House and the Theatre of S. Carlos. His mother was Balbina Hirsch.

== Liszt Boisselot piano ==
The Liszt Boisselot piano was donated to the Museum of Music. It has two pedals and seven octaves and is supported with a lyre-shaped part. The covers of the keys are ivory and ebony, while the soundboard is a cone and has a second soundboard in rosewood with which Boisselot intended to strengthen and enhance the sound of the instrument. The exterior is clad in rosewood and the inlaid decoration enriched with brass fillets. The side shelves decorated with lyres suggest the possibility of tracking or other instruments. The piano had a sign that identified the builder as well as the serial number, 2022.

== Works ==
- Te Deum (1858)
- Ave Maria (1887)
- Inês de Castro (opera) (1839)
- O Cerco de Diu (opera) (1841)
- II Conde di Leicester

== See also ==
- Additional biographical notes
- Information Centre Portuguese Music (CIMP) - list of compositions
- Works in Biblioteca National de Portugal
