= The Miracle Child =

1932 film

- Directed by: André Gillois
- Written by: Henri Diamant-Berger
- Starring: Blanche Montel; Armand Bernard; Nadine Picard; Marcel Vallée; Robert Goupil; Marguerite Guérau; Henri Kerny; Henri Marchand; Floryse; Viviane Elder; Marthe Mussine; Pierre Larquey; Ginette Leclerc
- Music by: Jean Renoir
- Production company: Films Diamant
- Distributed by: Compagnie Universelle Cinématographique
- Release date: 1932
- Country: France
- Language: French

The Miracle Child (French: L'enfant du miracle) is a 1932 French science fiction film based on a play of the same name by Robert Charvay and Paul Gavault. The plot of the film centers around a widow named Blanche Montel who endeavours to find a man she can have a child with so that she can pretend that the child was her late husband's and inherit his fortune. In a scene which has been cited as particularly humorous, a few characters interrupt a Spiritualist séance and are subsequently believed to be ghosts. Ginette Leclerc's minor role in The Miracle Child was one of her first acting roles in a long and successful career.
