= Viviane Elder =

Viviane Elder (born 23 May 1904 in Rennes, France – 21 October 1960 in Cannes, France) was an aviator, driver and actress from France.

In April 1936, Elder and two passengers caused concern when they were delayed for two days during a car rally in the Saharan desert. The magazine La Vie Arienne published a cover story on Elder titled "Viviane Elder - Perdue et Retrouvee" ("Lost and Found").

In 1948, Elder finished third in the 1100cc category race at the 18th Grand Prix des Frontières at Chimay, Belgium. Later the same year, she finished eighth in the Coupes du Salon race. In 1949, Elder competed in the 24 Hours of Le Mans car race in a Simca Huit, but did not finish.

== Filmography ==
- The Miracle Child (1932)
- Mephisto (1931)
