= Helen Lemmens-Sherrington =

English soprano (1834–1906)

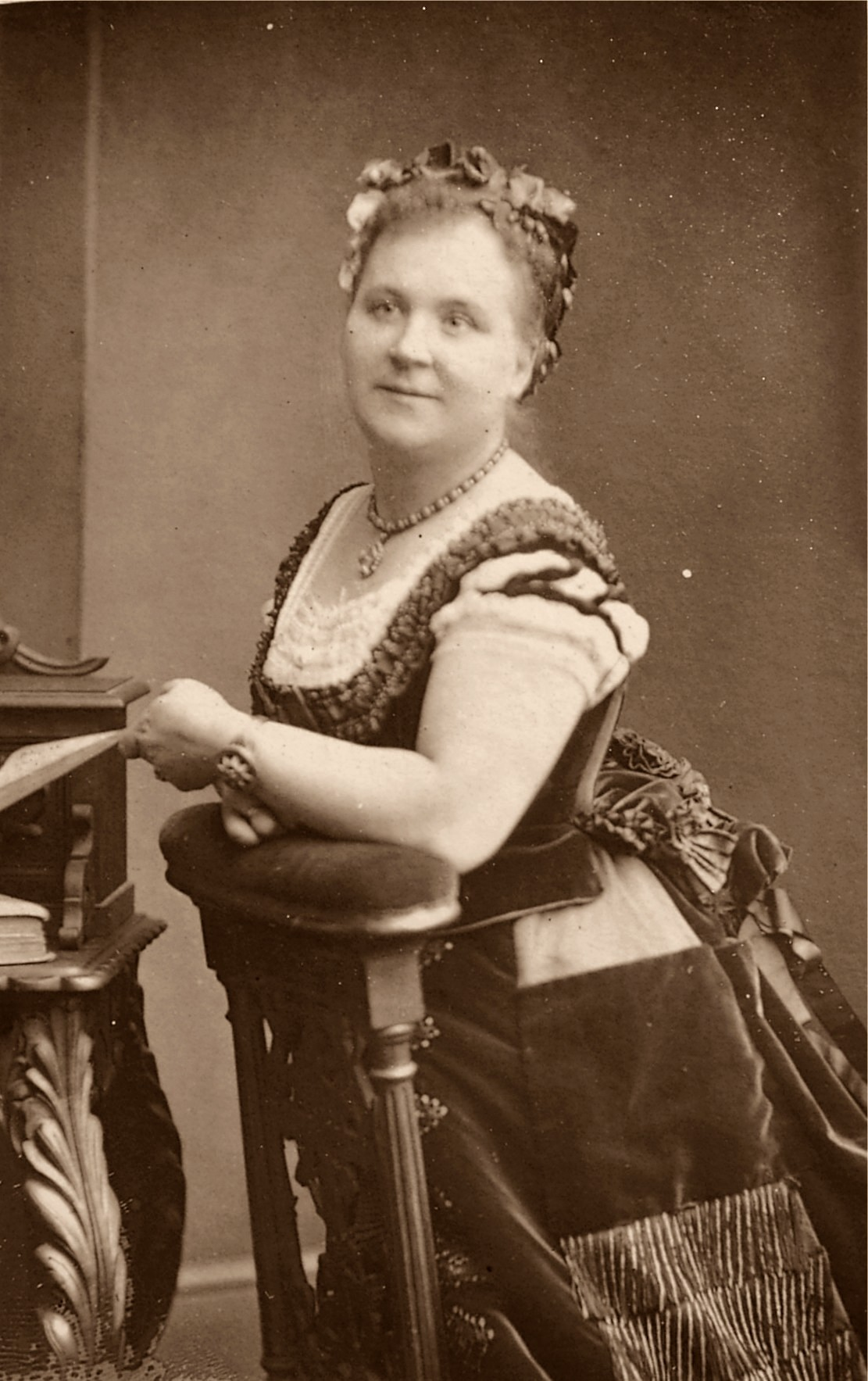
Helen Lemmens-Sherrington

Helen Lemmens-Sherrington (4 October 1834 – 9 May 1906) was an English concert and operatic soprano prominent from the 1850s to the 1880s. Born in northern England, she spent much of her childhood and later life in Belgium, where she studied at the Brussels Conservatory. After engagements in mainland Europe she made her London debut in 1856. Her singing career was mostly in concert, but in the first half of the 1860s she appeared in opera at Covent Garden and other leading London theatres.

After she retired from performing, Lemmens-Sherrington became a teacher, at her old music college in Brussels, and at the Royal Academy of Music in London and the Royal Manchester College of Music.

== Early life ==
Helen Sherrington was born in Preston, England, in 1834. When she was a child her family moved first to the Netherlands and then to Belgium. She studied singing at Rotterdam and at the Brussels Conservatory. She began her London career on the concert platform, building a reputation as a concert singer in the second half of the 1850s. After successes in the Netherlands and France she sang in London for the first time in 1856, and was invited to return in successive years. In 1859 The Illustrated London News said of her:

Madame Lemmens' voice is pure, brilliant and mellow: its compass exceeds two octaves and a half, with singular facility of vocalisation. With much natural feeling and artistic expression, Madame Lemmens possesses a refined and graceful style, and is altogether one of the most accomplished singers of the day.

In 1857 she married the Belgian organist and composer Jacques-Nicolas Lemmens, who founded the School of Church Music at Mechelen in 1878. They had two sons, who became engineers, and two daughters. One of them, Maggy Lemmens born in London on 7 September 1874 and died in Brussels on 29 March 1962, married a nephew of the architect Joseph Poelaert, René Poelaert, (1874–1946), stockbroker, director of the Central Mutual Fund and Public Funds, 5, Place de la Liberté, born 16 July 1874 in Brussels and died in Schaerbeek 12 December 1946, son of Constant Poelaert, lawyer at the Court of Appeal of Brussels (1827- 1898) and Ernestine Jacobs (1835–1882).

== Stage career ==
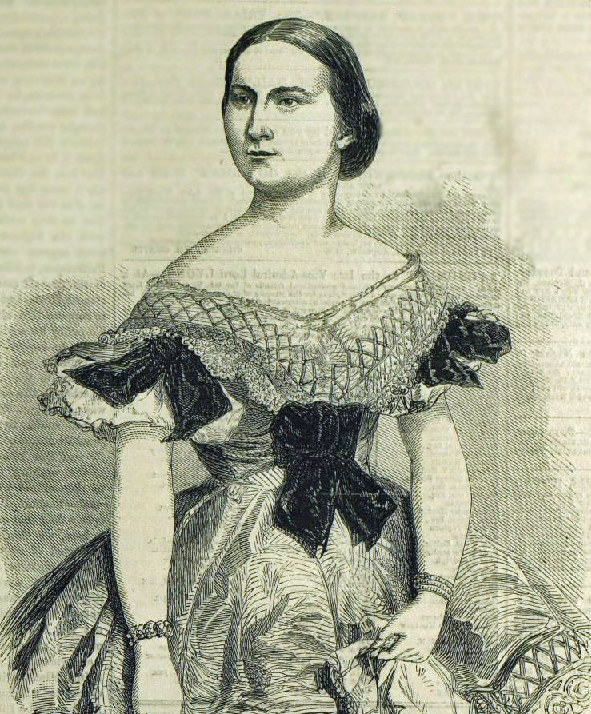
Lemmens-Sherrington in 1859

Lemmens-Sherrington's stage debut was in 1860, in the first production of a new opera, Robin Hood, by George Alexander Macfarren (libretto by John Oxenford). This was chosen by Edward Tyrrel Smith as the vehicle for an attempt to launch an English Opera at Her Majesty's Theatre, the English season to run concurrently with an Italian season on alternate nights. The singers engaged were Lemmens-Sherrington (Maid Marian), Mme Lemaire, Charles Santley, Mr Parkinson and John Sims Reeves (Locksley). The orchestra was conducted on English nights by Charles Hallé. The duet with Reeves, "When lovers are parted" and Marian's song "True love, true love in my heart" (the theme of which ran through the whole score) were "exquisitely warbled" and received enthusiastic applause. It was so successful that Reeves and Sherrington got a better box office even than Thérèse Tietjens and Antonio Giuglini on the alternate nights in Il trovatore and Don Giovanni. Immediately after this, with Santley, Janet Monach Patey and others, she appeared briefly in Wallace's The Amber Witch, but the bailiffs moved in, and on transfer to Drury Lane Theatre her role was taken by Euphrosyne Parepa-Rosa.

In January to March 1864, at Her Majesty's, Lemmens-Sherrington sang Marguerite in Gounod's Faust, in the second year of the English production, in the cast with Santley (introducing Dio possente), Reeves (distinguished in Act 1) and Marchesi (Mephisto). In the Royal English Opera at Covent Garden she appeared in Macfarren's Helvellyn (also shared with Parepa-Rosa) and in Rose, or Love's Ransom. For the next two seasons she appeared in the Italian Opera at Covent Garden, appearing as Donna Elvira (Don Giovanni), Adalgisa (Norma), Élisabeth de Valois (Don Carlos), Isabella (Robert le diable) and Prascovia (L'étoile du nord). After this her career was principally on the concert platform; she frequently sang with Santley, Patey, Antoinette Sterling, Sims Reeves and Signor Foli, at the popular "ballad concerts" under the management of John Boosey.

In 1871 she and her husband made an extensive tour with the popular French baritone Jules Lefort. In the same year Lemmens-Sherrington was one of the original group of musicians to be awarded the Gold Medal of the Royal Philharmonic Society. She was also among the first artists to have her singing voice recorded, including a duet with her husband. A description drawn from The Daily Telegraph shows that at a private hearing at The Crystal Palace on Good Friday 1878, "...both duets and solos were successfully tried by Madame Lemmens-Sherrington, M. Lemmens, Signor Foli, M. Manns and other skilled musicians, whose acute sense caused a phenomenon as yet unexplained—namely, that the musical sounds are reproduced in a higher key, half a tone being the difference. While M. Lemmens and his accomplished wife were singing a duet into the branched mouthpiece something caused them both to laugh, and this incident was faithfully reproduced by the machine"

== Later years ==
At the time of her husband's death, in 1881, Lemmens-Sherrington was appointed professor of singing at the Brussels Conservatory, and in 1891 at the Royal Academy of Music. From that time onwards she frequently resided in England. She also taught at the Royal Manchester College of Music, where one of her pupils was the contralto Edna Thornton.

In early 1889, just short of the 33rd anniversary of her first appearance in London, she appeared at the Royal Albert Hall in a performance of Peter Benoit's Flemish oratorio Lucifer. George Bernard Shaw, who was present, observed, "Madame Sherrington's method was always of the safest; and she has the advantage, not common among artists, of being a clever and sensible woman." "And, save once, when she pulled down the pitch during an unaccompanied chorus, and so made the entry of the organ an appalling catastrophe, there was no falling off to complain of." She received "a hearty spontaneous reception which she acknowledged with all her old grace." The work itself was a complete failure. On 1 November 1894 Lemmens-Sherrington came out of retirement to sing for the last time in public, in Haydn's Creation at a concert in Manchester honouring Hallé. The Manchester Guardian commented that though the voice was not as rich and powerful as it had been twenty years earlier, "an artist is always an artist, and in everything she sang last night, Madame Sherrington displayed the skill of an artist by her finished vocalisation."

Her last years were spent in retirement at 7 Rue Capouillet, Brussels, where she lived with two sisters. She died there on 9 May 1906, at the age of 71.
