= Bezauberndes Fräulein =

Musical comedy in four scenes by Ralph Benatzky

- Musical comedy by Ralph Benatzky
- Translation: The Charming Young Lady
- Librettist: Ralph Benatzky
- Language: German
- Based on: La petite chocolatière by Paul Gavault
- Premiere: 24 May 1933; Volkstheater, Vienna

Bezauberndes Fräulein (The Charming Young Lady) is a musical comedy in four scenes, similar in style to an operetta. Ralph Benatzky wrote both music and libretto, inspired by the French farce La petite chocolatière by Paul Gavault. The work premiered on 24 May 1933, in the Volkstheater in Vienna, Austria.

== Roles ==
The cast does not require operatic voices, just singing actors.

Role	Voice type/actor type	
Annette, the charming lady	soubrette	
Paul	tenor	Max Hansen (tenor)
Rosette	soubrette	Lizzi Waldmüller
Louise	alto	
The Boss, Louise's father	baritone	
Annette's father	baritone	
Julie, Paul's housekeeper	alto	
The chauffeur	baritone	
a colleague of Paul's	baritone	
Hektor, Annette's fiancé	actor	
a waiter	actor	

== Scoring ==
The required orchestra comprises piano, flute, oboe, two clarinets, two trumpets, bassoon, three saxophones, banjo, guitar, percussion and strings. Alternatively, the instrumental music has also been arranged for two pianos.

== Synopsis ==
=== Setting ===
The piece is set in an unnamed German-speaking city in the early 1930s. In modern performances, it is normally set in the present.

=== First scene ===
Setting: Living area in Paul's weekend house

Slightly overstretched painter Felix and his favourite model Rosette are visiting the weekend house of their friend Paul, a high-ranking civil servant. They want to retire to sleep immediately after their last hand of bridge, but Paul is full of anticipation for the coming day. For the first time, his boss has indicated he will visit on Sunday, as he now knows that his daughter Louise has secretly become engaged to Paul. Louise's visit is also anticipated.

Felix and Rosette know Louise and find her rather boring, and also nothing special to look at. They therefore contemplate how to break off Paul's engagement to Louise. In the middle of the night, a solution presents itself: the doorbell rings. Felix opens the door and is overcome by the beautiful form of the young lady standing in front of him. She has a flat tyre and is requesting help. While Paul reacts unhelpfully, Felix accompanies the "charming lady" to her car and acts as if to help. She is not interested and converses with her chauffeur, so he slashes the tyre and makes the flat tyre worse. Annette, the young lady, must be offered a bed for the night in Paul's house. The chauffeur sets out with Paul's housekeeper Julie on foot, to inform Annette's father what has happened. All the others go to bed.

=== Second scene ===
Setting: Living area in Paul's weekend house

A new day has started. Paul does everything he can to get rid of Annette, but the more he talks to her, the more attracted she seems to become to him. She wants to wait in peace until she is picked up by her father, the prosperous "Chocolate King". When the doorbell rings, Paul hopes she will immediately be gone; instead of Annette's father, Paul's boss and his daughter Louise enter the house. They are both outraged to find an unknown woman there in a negligee, and leave the house within minutes. Paul is totally bemused, while Felix is quite satisfied with the proceedings. This doesn't last, as the "Chocolate King" enters, but not alone, rather with Annette's fiancé Hektor in tow. Annette awaits accusations and blame, but Hektor appears quite relaxed — no word of reproach passes his lips. Now Annette is angry; she can't stand Hektor's passivity and ends the engagement on the spot. Felix's plan appears to be working.

=== Third scene ===
Setting: Office in the Ministry

Felix has arranged for Annette to visit Paul during his lunch break in his office. Paul, shy to a fault, doesn't know how to deal with the situation. Annette kisses Paul just as Paul's boss enters the room. The boss is furious, having depended on Paul as a right-hand man for many years and hoping to welcome him as a son-in-law. Paul realises that Felix is behind the situation. While just a moment before, he wasn't sure whether he should perhaps court Annette, now it is clear: Annette must be removed from his life.

=== Fourth scene ===
Setting: By a river

While entertaining thoughts of the "charming lady", Paul is also beset by an urge to throw himself into the river and end his life. Suddenly he notices a woman in a simple dress, the uniform of the Salvation Army, approaching him. As she nears him, he realises it is Annette. His heart beats wildly. Annette offers that for him, she would sacrifice all her riches. Paul abandons his morose thoughts and takes her in his arms. Two men are watching, concealed: the "chocolate king" and Felix; they have successfully pulled the necessary strings to reach the happy ending.

== Musical highlights ==
Paul's Song "Ach Louise, kein Mädchen ist wie diese!" ("Ah Louise, unlike any other girl!")

Felix' Couplet "Hokuspokus fidibus" ("Hocus Pocus of Faiths")

Paul's Song "Was hast du schon davon, wenn ich dich liebe?" ("What is it to you, if I'm in love?")

Annette and Paul, tango, "Sie kommen zum Tee!" ("They're coming to tea!")

Annette's father, Felix, Chauffeur, Paul, Annette "Bezauberndes Fräulein / Ja, was ist denn heute los mit mir?“ ("Charming lady / Yes, what's wrong with me today?")

== Film adaptations ==
The musical comedy was filmed in 1953 under the direction of Georg Thomalla. The director played the male lead himself. Other cast members included Ingrid Andree, Herta Staal, Gisela Fackeldey and Karl Schönböck. A 1977 TV film was directed by Erich Neureuther.
