= Paul Gavault =

French dramatist, playwright and theatre director

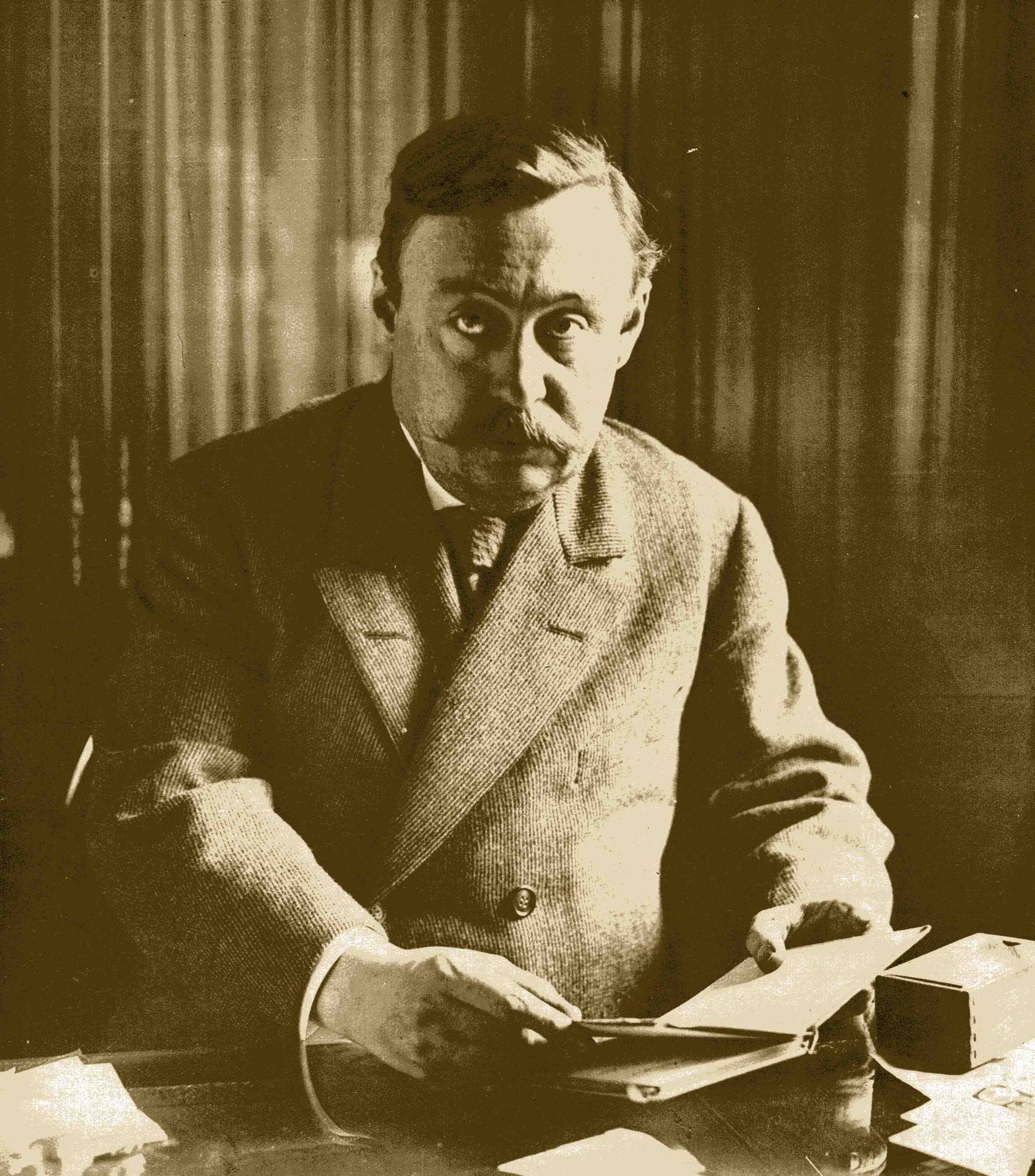
- Born: Paul Armand Marcel Gavault; 1 September 1866; 17th arrondissement of Paris
- Died: 25 December 1951 (aged 85); Paris
- Occupations: Dramatist, playwright and Theater director

Paul Armand Marcel Gavault (1 September 1866 – 25 December 1951) was a French dramatist, playwright and former director of the théâtre de l'Odéon.

== Biography ==
He enjoyed a hit with his 1906 comic play Mademoiselle Josette, My Woman which was co-authored by Robert Charvay.

Paul Gavault was a screenwriter for the Le Film d'Art production company, working in particular for the films La Grande Bretèche (1909, after Balzac), Joseph vendu par ses frères (1909, codirected with Georges Berr), Le Luthier de Crémone (1909), Le Légataire universel (1909), Werther (1910, after Goethe), Madame de Langeais (1910, after Balzac), Carmen (1910, after Mérimée), Vitellius (1910), L'Héritière (1910), Jésus de Nazareth (1911) and L'Usurpateur (1911), Mademoiselle Josette, ma femme (1914).

He was named director of the théâtre de l'Odéon in 1914.

== Works ==
- 1897 : Le Pompier de service, with Victor de Cottens, Théâtre des Variétés
- 1898 : Les Petites Barnett, with Louis Varney, Théâtre des Variétés
- 1900 : Moins cinq..., with Georges Berr, Théâtre du Palais-Royal
- 1901 : L'Inconnue, with Georges Berr, Théâtre du Palais-Royal
- 1901 : Madame Flirt, with Georges Berr, Théâtre de l'Athénée
- 1902 : Les Aventures du capitaine Corcoran, with Georges Berr and Adrien Vély, Théâtre du Châtelet
- 1903 : Paris aux Variétés, Théâtre des Variétés
- 1903 : L'Enfant du miracle, 3 acts comédie bouffe, with Robert Charvay
- 1904 : La Dette, with Georges Berr, Théâtre de l'Odéon
- 1906 : Mademoiselle Josette, ma femme, with Robert Charvay, Théâtre du Gymnase Marie Bell
- 1907 : La Dame du 23, with Albert Bourgain, Théâtre du Palais Royal
- 1907 : La Revue du centenaire, 3 acts show with Pierre-Louis Flers and Eugène Héros, Théâtre des Variétés
- 1909 : Monsieur Zéro
- 1909 : Moins cinq
- 1909 : La Petite chocolatière, Théâtre de la Renaissance
- 1912 : Le Bonheur sous la main
- 1912 : L'idée de Françoise, Théâtre de la Renaissance
- 1914 : Ma tante d'Honfleur, Théâtre des Variétés
- 1914 : Le Mannequin
- 1925 : L'École du bonheur, 3 acts comedy, Théâtre Daunou
- 1933 : Le Paradis perdu, Théâtre de l'Athénée
- 1933 : Bezauberndes Fräulein, 4 acts operetta by Ralph Benatzky, based on La Petite chocolatière

== Filmography ==
- La Petite chocolatière, directed by André Liabel (France, 1914, based on the play La Petite chocolatière)
- Mademoiselle Josette, ma femme, directed by André Liabel (France, 1914, based on the play Mademoiselle Josette, ma femme)
- The Richest Girl, directed by Albert Capellani (1918, based on the play La Petite chocolatière)
- The Frisky Mrs. Johnson, directed by Edward Dillon (1920, based on the play Madame Flirt)
- L'idée de Françoise, directed by Robert Saidreau (France, 1923, based on the play L'idée de Françoise)
- Ma tante d'Honfleur, directed by Robert Saidreau (France, 1923, based on the play Ma tante d'Honfleur)
- Mademoiselle Josette, My Woman, directed by Gaston Ravel (France, 1926, based on the play Mademoiselle Josette, ma femme)
- The Chocolate Girl, directed by René Hervil (France, 1927, based on the play La Petite chocolatière)
- The Chocolate Girl, directed by Marc Allégret (France, 1932, based on the play La Petite chocolatière)
- Ma tante d'Honfleur, directed by André Gillois (France, 1932, based on the play Ma tante d'Honfleur)
- Un coup de téléphone, directed by Georges Lacombe (France, 1932, based on Un coup de téléphone)
- The Miracle Child, directed by André Gillois (France, 1932, based on the play L'Enfant du miracle)
- Le Crime du chemin rouge, directed by Jacques Séverac (France, 1933, based on Les yeux du cœur)
- Mademoiselle Josette, My Woman, directed by André Berthomieu (France, 1933, based on the play Mademoiselle Josette, ma femme)
- Wer wagt – gewinnt, directed by Walter Janssen (Germany, 1935, based on the operetta Bezauberndes Fräulein)
- La signora in nero, directed by Nunzio Malasomma (Italy, 1943, based on the play La Petite chocolatière)
- En förtjusande fröken, directed by Börje Larsson (Sweden, 1945, based on the operetta Bezauberndes Fräulein)
- Ma tante d'Honfleur, directed by René Jayet (France, 1949, based on the play Ma tante d'Honfleur)
- The Chocolate Girl, directed by André Berthomieu (France, 1950, based on the play La Petite chocolatière)
- Mademoiselle Josette, My Woman, directed by André Berthomieu (France, 1950, based on the play Mademoiselle Josette, ma femme)
- The Charming Young Lady, directed by Georg Thomalla (West Germany, 1953, based on the operetta Bezauberndes Fräulein)

== Bibliography ==
- « Le nouveau directeur de l'Odéon : M. Paul Gavault », Le Miroir, 10 mai 1914
- Christian Genty, Histoire du Théâtre national de l'Odéon : journal de bord, 1782-1982, Fischbacher, Paris, 1982, 320 p. ISBN 2-7179-0002-0
