= The Amber Witch =

1838 novel published by Wilhelm Meinhold

- Title page of The Amber Witch, English translation
- Author: Wilhelm Meinhold
- Original title: Maria Schweidler, die Bernsteinhexe
- Translator: E. A. Friedlander
- Language: German
- Set in: 17th-century
- Publication date: 1838
- English publication date: 1844

The Amber Witch is a German novel published by Wilhelm Meinhold (1797–1851) in 1838. Its German title is Maria Schweidler, die Bernsteinhexe. The novel was originally published as a literary hoax which purported to be an actual 17th-century chronicle. Meinhold later admitted to the hoax but had some difficulty in proving that he was its author. In 1844, it was published in Britain as The Amber Witch in two English translations: one by E. A. Friedlander and another, more enduring, translation by Lucie, Lady Duff-Gordon.

Lady Duff Gordon's translation was very popular with the Victorians and went through numerous editions, including a luxurious one in 1895 illustrated by Philip Burne-Jones. The novel was a favourite of Oscar Wilde's when he was a boy, and in 1861 it was made into an opera, The Amber Witch, composed by William Vincent Wallace. Wallace's opera has faded into obscurity, but the novel on which it was based has continued to be republished, both on its own and in anthologies.

== Background ==
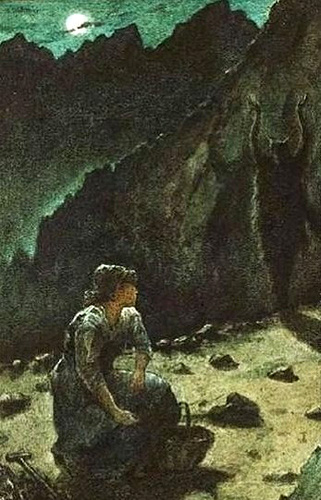
Apparition on the Streckelberg, an illustration by Philip Burne-Jones for an 1895 edition of The Amber Witch.

Meinhold claimed to have discovered a manuscript written by a 17th-century minister, Abraham Schweidler (purportedly a pastor of Coserow and known for his fire and brimstone sermons) amongst rubbish in the choir of the old Coserow church. The manuscript contained the story of the pastor's daughter Maria, the "Amber Witch".

The tale was described by Meinhold, in the subtitle of the novel, as "the most interesting trial for witchcraft ever known". When it first appeared, almost all of the German critics believed it was an authentic historical document. The work attracted critical notice, not only for the dramatic nature of its narrative but also for disputes about which parts of it were original and which were Meinhold's reconstructions, written in imitation of the 17th-century style.

Meinhold's intention was to set a trap for the disciples of David Strauss and his school, who pronounced the Bible to be a collection of legends from historical research assisted by internal evidence. In a direct challenge to these "modern documentary critics", Meinhold wrote in his preface to The Amber Witch:

I have therefore attempted, not indeed to supply what is missing at the beginning and end, but to restore those leaves which have been torn out of the middle, imitating, as accurately as I was able, the language and manner of the old biographer, in order that the difference between the original narrative and my own interpolations might not be too evident. This I have done with much trouble, and after many ineffectual attempts; but I refrain from pointing out the particular passages which I have supplied, so as not to disturb the historical interest of the greater part of my readers. For modern criticism, which has now attained to a degree of acuteness never before equalled, such a confession would be entirely superfluous, as critics will easily distinguish the passages where Pastor Schweidler speaks from those written by Pastor Meinhold."

Only in a later edition did the author admit that the tale was entirely imaginary. His admission that it was a hoax was at first rejected but was soon accepted as the truth. As The Times wrote in the late 1840s:

Meinhold did not spare them [Strauss and his disciples] when they fell into his snare, and [he] made merry with the historical knowledge and critical acumen that could not detect the contemporary romancer under the mask of two centuries ago, while they decide so positively as to the authorities of the most ancient writings in the world.

The hoax was done with great skill and attention to detail, using language that would have been used in 17th-century Germany.

Writer Seabury Quinn wrote an article in the August 1925 issue of Weird Tales in which, unaware of the hoax, he recounted the plot of The Amber Witch as if it were an actual historical event.

== Plot ==
The story is set during the Thirty Years' War. The purported author, Reverend Abraham Schweidler, almost loses his only child, Maria, to a plot by a rejected suitor, Sheriff Appelmann, who has accused Maria of practicing witchcraft. In this he was aided by an evil and jealous woman of the neighborhood.

After a trial and under threat of the most dire torture, Maria, wholly innocent of the crime, confesses. While on her way to the stake, she is rescued by a courageous young nobleman who loves her and who exposes the evil plot against her.

== See also ==
- Pomerania
- Thirty Years' War
- Wilhelm Meinhold

== Bibliography ==
- Bleiler, E.F., ed. (1971). Five Victorian Ghost Novels. New York: Dover Publications, Inc. ISBN 978-0-486-22558-6.
