= Les deux aveugles =

One-act operetta by Jacques Offenbach

Jacques Offenbach by Nadar, c. 1860s

Les deux aveugles (French pronunciation: [le døz‿avœɡl], The Two Blind Men or The Blind Beggars) is an 1855 one-act French bouffonerie musicale (operetta) by Jacques Offenbach. The libretto was written by Jules Moinaux and was a condensation of his 3-act Les musiciens ambulants.

The half-hour long piece is a comic sketch about two (supposedly) blind beggars, consisting of an overture and four numbers. Offenbach was bold in making light of the disabled poor, but he believed that his patrons would see the humour of the piece. Most Parisians had been pestered by beggars on Parisian street corners, and Offenbach's blind beggars were con men, rather than deserving outcasts of society. The little piece was an instant hit, praised for its catchy dance tunes, and it soon spread Offenbach's name and music around the world.

== Performance history ==
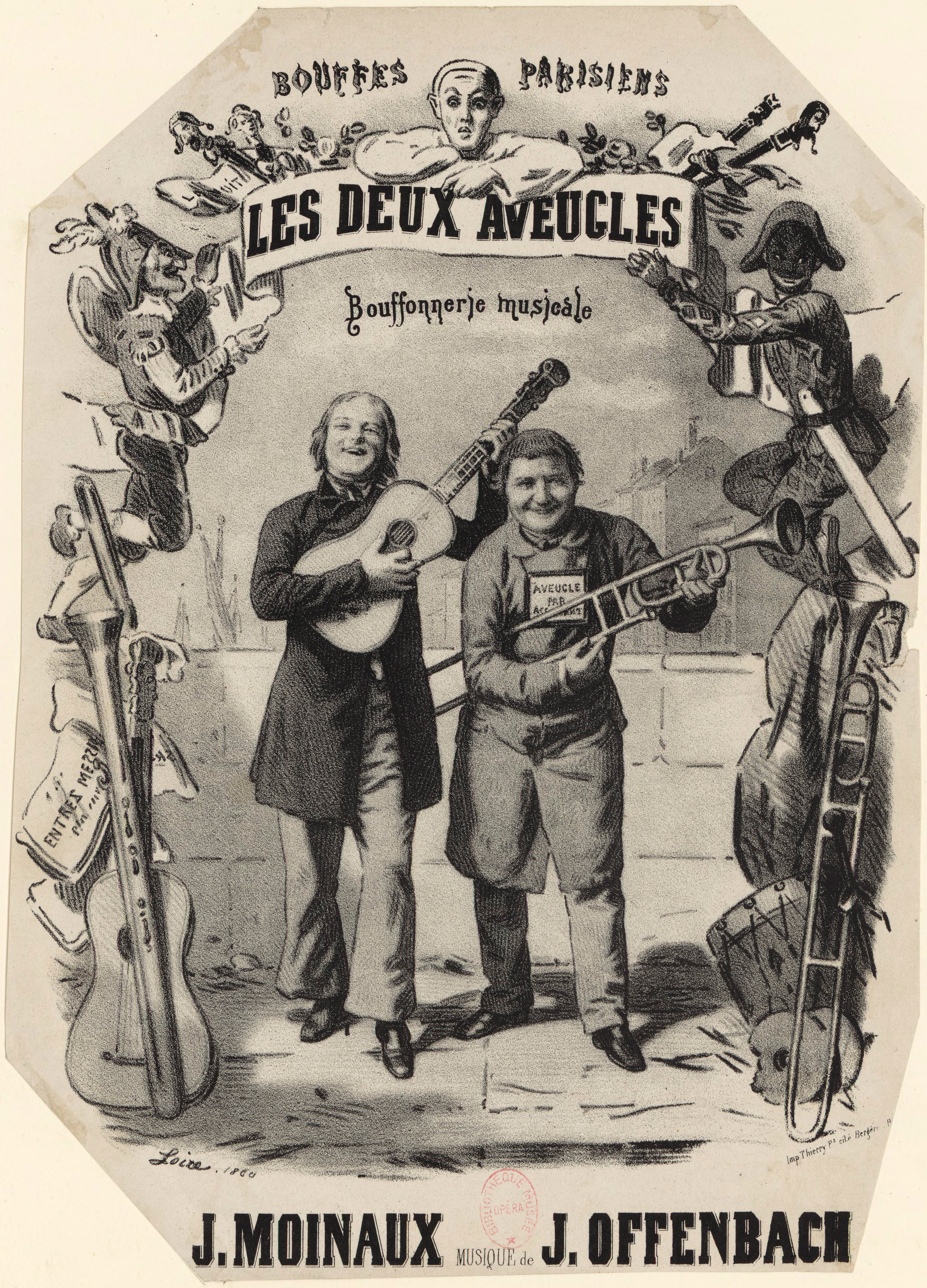
Drawing for the cover of the piano-vocal score, 1860

Les deux aveugles premiered on the opening night of the Bouffes-Parisiens on 5 July 1855 at the company's first theatre, the tiny Salle Lacaze on the Champs-Elysées in Paris. It was the hit of the evening and was performed at the Salle Lacaze into the fall, making stars of the comedians who appeared in it. After Offenbach's new winter theatre, the Salle Choiseul, opened in December, the show continued to be presented there. It had become so successful, that Louis-Napoléon invited Offenbach's company to perform it for representatives to the Congress of Paris in the Salon de Diane in the Palace of the Tuileries on 28 February 1856. A revised version was presented in Paris at a matinee gala at the Opéra-Comique's second Salle Favart on 28 May 1858, with revivals on 6 November 1900, 14 December 1910, and 12 December 1934.

The piece was first seen in Berlin at Kroll's on 10 March 1856 and in Vienna at the Carltheater on 19 April, where it played as part of a tour by the French actor Pierre Levassor from the Théâtre du Palais-Royal. The first work by Offenbach to be presented in Vienna, it strongly influenced the subsequent career of Karl Treumann. On 27 June 1856 Levassor and his partner Jules Lefort gave the first performance in London, a concert version at the Hanover Square Rooms, and it was also part of the opening night of the Bouffes-Parisiens' first London season in 1857, which ran at St James's Theatre from 20 May to 14 July. It was given in Antwerp (in French) on 21 November 1856, New York at the Metropolitan Music Hall on 31 August 1857, Buenos Aires on 13 October 1861, and Saigon, the first opera ever performed there, in the autumn of 1864.

Les deux aveugles was translated into German by Carl Friedrich Wittmann as Zwei arme Blinde and was performed in Vienna at the Theater am Franz-Josefs-Kai on 26 May 1863 and in Dresden on 19 November 1866. In English it played at London's Gallery of Illustration as Beggar Thy Neighbour on 29 March 1870, at London's large Gaiety Theatre as A Mere Blind (translated by H. B. Farnie and starring Fred Sullivan) on 15 April 1871, and by Harry Rickards' company at the School of Arts in Sydney, Australia, as The Blind Beggars on 9 September 1873. The Opéra de Monte Carlo performed it in French on 7 May 1902, and London's Ambassadors Theatre, on 11 May 1914 (also in French). It had clearly become one of Offenbach's most successful one-act works.

Arthur Sullivan saw the piece performed by the amateur "Moray Minstrels" group in London and was prompted to collaborate with F. C. Burnand on the first of his many operettas, Cox and Box (1866). In its use of the voice imitating a musical instrument and the combination together of separate melodies (though done previously by Sullivan), Offenbach's work points towards features of the one-act Sullivan piece, with which it shared an evening.

A complete performance of Les deux aveugles (followed by Croquefer, ou Le dernier des paladins) forms part of the 1996 television film Offenbachs Geheimnis, directed by István Szabó, with Laurence Dale as Patachon and Graham Clark as Girafier.

The work was presented by Palazzetto Bru Zane on a double bill with Le compositeur toqué by Hervé at the Théâtre Marigny, Paris, for a series of performances beginning in January 2019.

== Subsequent works ==
With Les deux aveugles Offenbach became the darling of Second Empire Paris. His later pieces would continue to mock customs of the day, without really upsetting the status quo enjoyed by the theatre-going public. Offenbach's early operettas were small-scale one-act works, since the law in France limited musical theatre works (at all except the principal theatres) to one-act pieces with no more than three singers and, perhaps, some mute characters.

In 1858, this law was changed, and Offenbach was able to offer full-length works, beginning with Orpheus in the Underworld.

== Roles ==
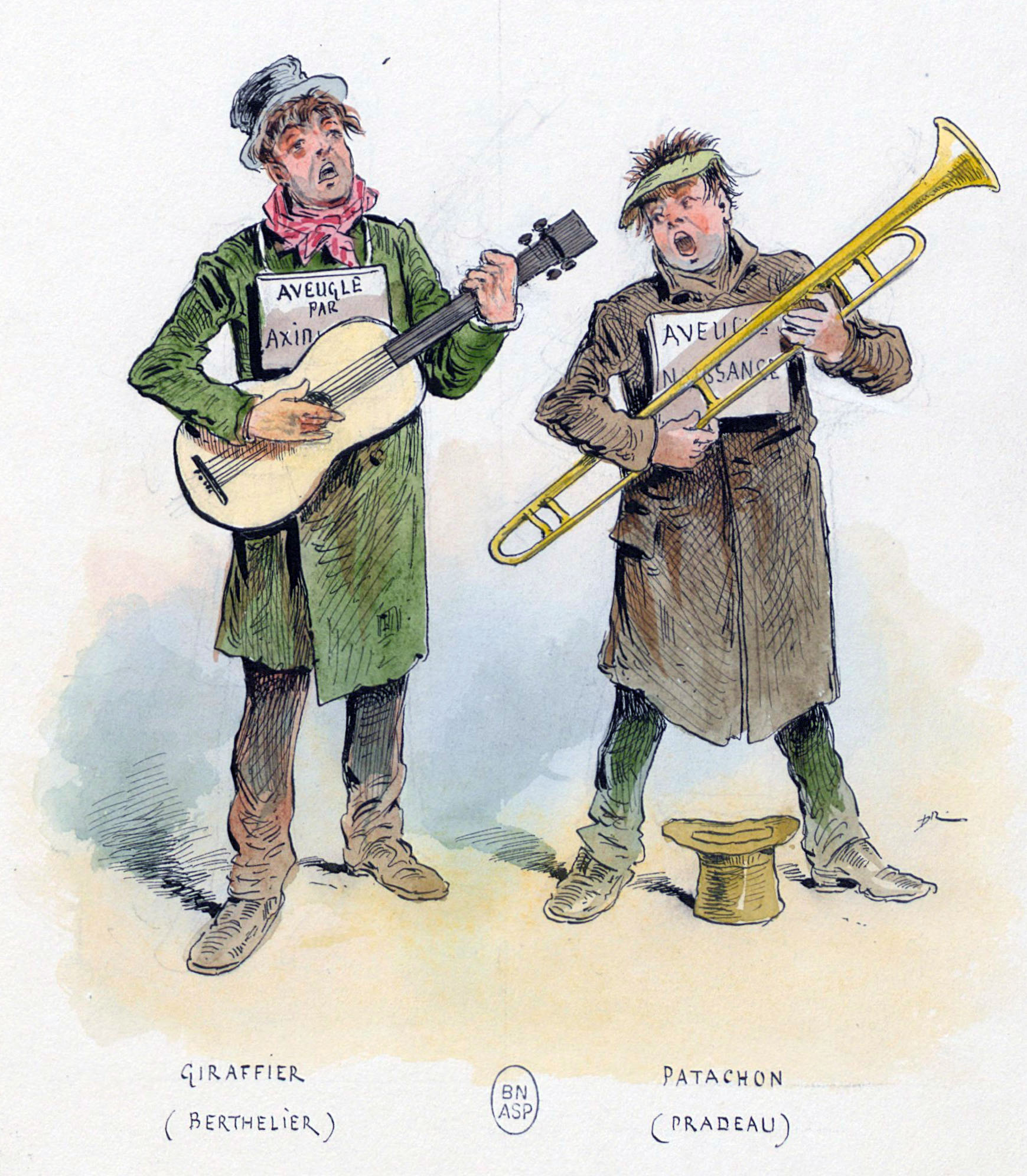
Berthelier and Pradeau, 1855

Role	Voice type	Premiere cast, 5 July 1855 (Conductor: Jacques Offenbach)	Revised version, 28 May 1858 (Conductor: Giannini)
Giraffier	tenor	Jean-François Berthelier	Jean-François Berthelier
Patachon	tenor	Étienne Pradeau	Charles-Louis Sainte-Foy

== Synopsis ==
Time: 19th century
Place: Paris

Two "blind" beggars compete for the best position on a bridge, first in a musical battle with Patachon playing on a trombone and Giraffier a mandolin, then in a game of cards, in which they cheat and betray their pretense of blindness. 'Business' has not been brisk. When passers-by drop coins, the beggars are able to see well enough to retrieve them. To impress each other, they fabricate wild stories, accompanied by singing. The contest becomes comically grotesque.

== Music ==
The music consists of an overture and four short numbers, of which the bolero, a duet which begins "La lune brille, le ciel scintille" ("The moon beams, the sky sparkles"), is probably the standout.
