= Anne Charton-Demeur =

French opera singer (1824–1892)

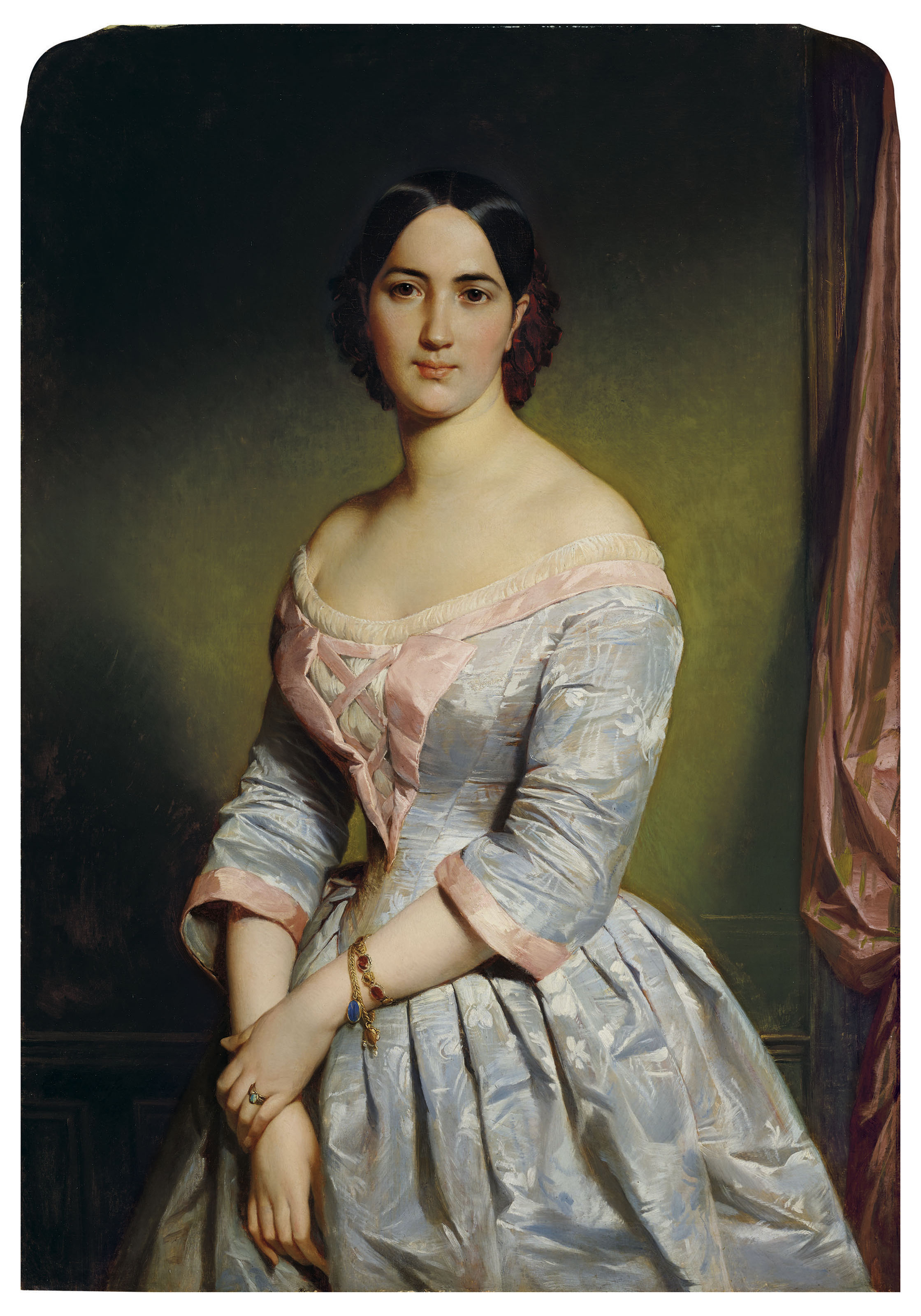
Anne Arsène Charton-Demeur, by Édouard Dubufe

Anne Arsène Charton-Demeur (5 March 1824 – 30 November 1892) was a French opera singer. Classified by different authors as a soprano or a mezzo-soprano, she appeared in leading roles in many operas, particularly in the original productions of Berlioz's operas Béatrice et Bénédict and Les Troyens.

== Life ==
She was born in Saujon, Charente-Maritime, and was taught music by Bizot of Bordeaux. In 1842 she made her début there as Lucia in Lucia di Lammermoor. She sang in Toulouse and in 1846 in Brussels. In July of the same year she made a successful début at Drury Lane in London, as Madeleine in Le postillon de Lonjumeau and also appeared in La Juive in England in July, and with great success as Angèle in Le domino noir.

In 1847 she married Jules-Antoine Demeur, a flautist from Belgium, whom she met at Drury Lane. He subsequently travelled with his wife on her engagements.

In 1849 and 1850 she was the principal female singer in John Mitchell's French opera company at St James's Theatre in London, and became highly popular in various light parts, many of which were new to England. These included Angèle, Henriette in L'ambassadrice, Isabelle in Le pré aux clercs, Zanetta in Auber's opera of that name, Laurette in Richard Coeur-de-lion, Adèle in Auber's Le concert à la cour, Lucrezia in Actéon, the Queen of Léon in Boisselot's Ne touchez pas à la reine, The Countess in Le comte Ory, Anna in La dame blanche, Camille in Zampa, Rose de Mai in Le val d'Andorre, Virginie in Le caïd, and Catarina in Les diamants de la couronne. The critic Henry Chorley wrote: "She made an impression when singing in French comic opera by her pleasing voice and appearance and by a certain cosiness of manner which was very charming".

In 1852 she appeared in July at Her Majesty's Theatre as Amina in La sonnambula, and in August in the Duke of Saxe-Coburg-Gotha's Casilda.

Having sung with little success in 1849 and 1853 at the Opéra-Comique in Paris, she adopted the Italian stage, and appeared successfully in St Petersburg, Vienna, in North and South America, and in Paris at the Théâtre-Italien as Desdemona in Rossini's Otello in 1862.

In August of that year, Anne Charton-Demeur played the heroine in the original production of Berlioz's Béatrice et Bénédict, so much to the composer's satisfaction that he requested her to play Dido in Les Troyens, first produced at the Théâtre Lyrique, opening on 4 November 1863. Berlioz wrote in his Mémoires about her great beauty, her passionate acting and singing as Dido, although she had not sufficient voice wholly to realise his ideal heroine, and her generosity in accepting the engagement at a pecuniary loss to herself, a more lucrative offer having been made her for an engagement in Madrid. On the conclusion of the run of the opera she sang at Madrid, but afterwards returned to the Lyrique, where, in May 1866, she played Donna Anna in Don Giovanni.

After formally retiring from singing about 1869, she appeared occasionally in concerts. She died in Paris in 1892.
