= Paul Puget =

French composer

Paul Charles Marie Curet, (also known as Puget, 25 June 1848 – 15 March 1917) was a French composer.

== Life ==
Born in Nantes into a family of musicians (his father Henri Puget was a renowned tenor at his time), Paul Puget studied at the Conservatoire de Paris, piano in Antoine François Marmontel's class and musical composition with Victor Massé. In 1873, he entered the competition of the Institut de France and obtained the first Grand Prix de Rome for his cantata Mazeppa.

From his stay at the Villa Médicis from 1874 to 1877, date his Ouverture de Macbeth for orchestra, the ode Sur l'aveuglement des hommes du siècle (text by Jean-Baptiste Rousseau) for barytone, choir and orchestra, and a Symphonie en ut. In 1896, he composed stage music for Musset's Lorenzaccio, premiered by Sarah Bernhardt at the Théâtre de la Renaissance. In 1900, he was appointed conductor of the choirs of the Opéra de Paris.

Albeit he is mainly known for his lyrical works, he also composed many art songs, pieces for piano, and a Bassoon solo with piano accompaniment, which served as a competition piece at the Conservatoire de Paris in 1899 and 1916, the Scènes champêtres for orchestra, and some religious music.

In 1883, he was in the news. The Count of Lagoda, a Russian officer, who lost his fortune and whom the young actress Blanche Miroir left in Saint Petersburg, found a portrait of Blanche Miroir framed in flowers in his home. He provoked the musician, and a sword fight took place on 18 April, near Paris. The Russian was slightly injured in the right arm. The next day, Mr. de Lagoda left for Brussels. He reproached the actress for her betrayal, and it is as a result of these scenes of jealousy that he tried to kill her and killed himself.

Paul Puget died in Paris on 15 March 1917 and is buried at the Montmartre Cemetery.

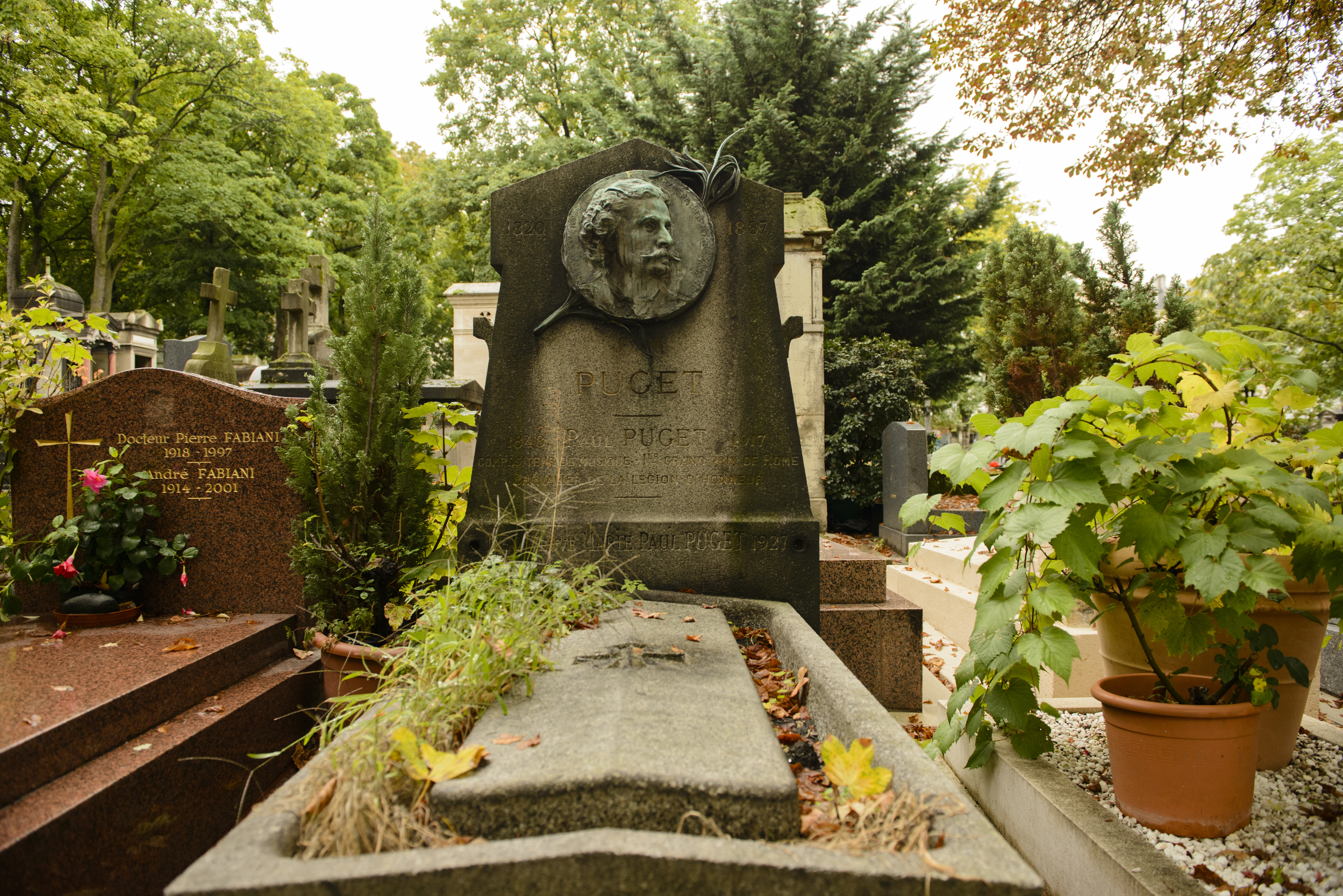
Grave at Montmartre Cemetery

== Stage works ==
- Le Maître danseur, operetta-bouffe in 1 act (1869)
- Les Jardins d’Armide, opéra-bouffe in 3 acts (1872)
- La Marocaine, opéra-comique in 1 act
- André del Sarto, lyrical drama in two acts, based on Musset
- Le Signal, opéra-comique in 1 act (1886)
- Beaucoup de bruit pour rien, lyrical drama in 4 acts, based on Shakespeare (1899)
- Ulysse et les sirènes, ancient scene

== Bibliography ==
- François-Joseph Fétis and Arthur Pougin: Biographie universelle des musiciens et bibliographie générale de la musique: Supplément et complément, volume 2 (Paris: Firmin-Didot, 1880), p. 372-373.
