= Theater Baden-Baden =

Coordinates: 48°45′35″N 8°14′16″E

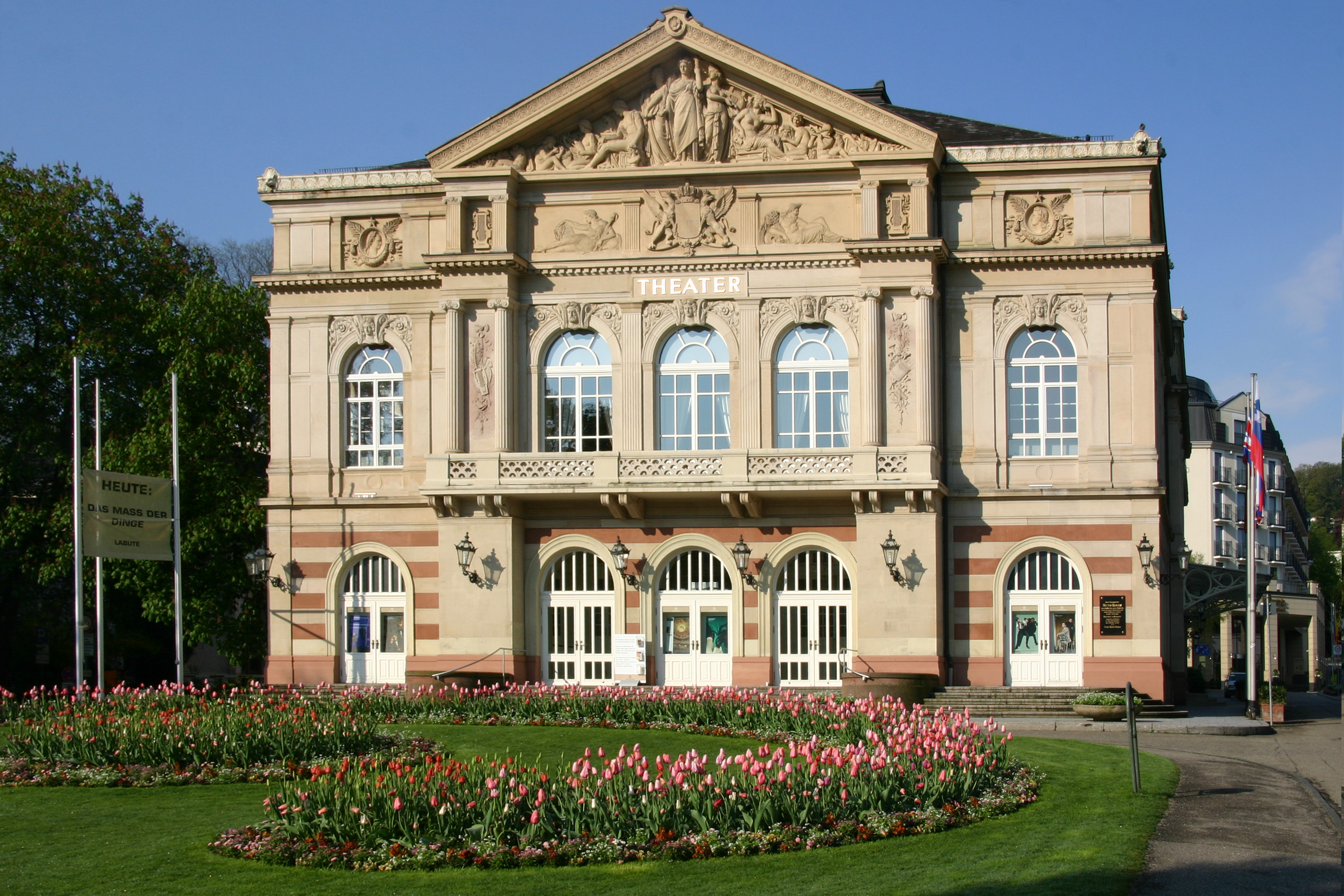
Theater of Baden-Baden

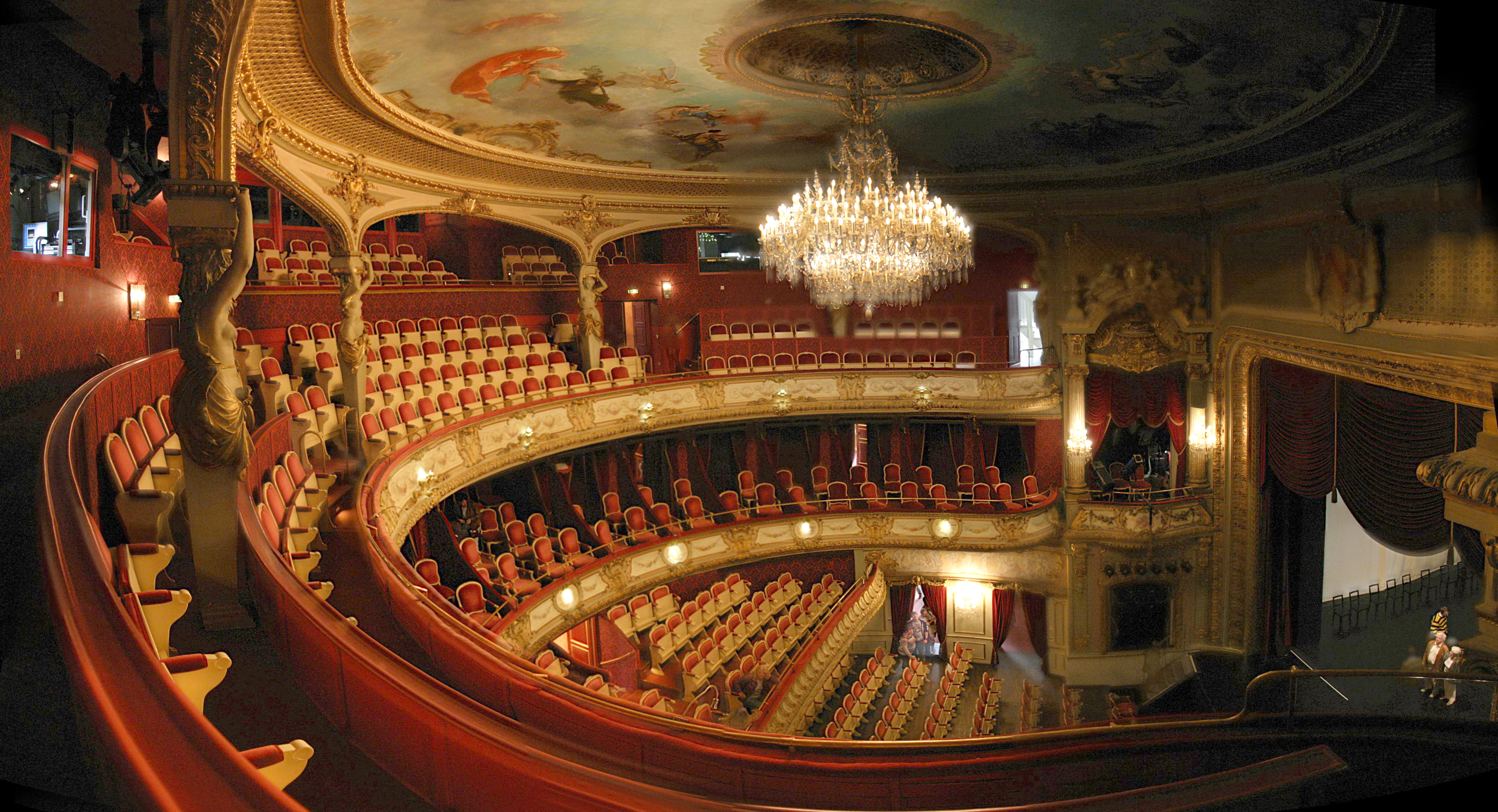
Auditorium

Theater Baden-Baden at Goetheplatz (Götheplatz in German) is the city theater of Baden-Baden in the Black Forest in Baden-Württemberg, Germany built between 1860 and 1862.

== History ==
At the instigation of Edouard Bénazet, a former casino director, the theater was modeled on the Paris Opera by Charles Couteau.

Especially for the opening in August 1862 Hector Berlioz composed the opera Béatrice et Bénédict after Shakespeare's Much Ado About Nothing. In 1869 Jacques Offenbach conducted the premiere of his operetta La princesse de Trébizonde.

Since 1918 the theater has had an ensemble of permanently employed actors. Opera and other works of the musical theater are also performed as part of guest performances and co-productions. At the beginning of the 1990s the theater was completely renovated and equipped with modern technology.

In 2025, Theater Baden-Baden announced that Simon Meienreis would be the theater director for the 2026/27 season.

== Festivals and events ==
The theater is one of the venues of the New Pop Festival. The premises, especially the foyer, can be rented for weddings and other events.
