= Jean-Louis Boisselot =

French Composer and piano manufacturer

Jean-Baptiste-Louis Boisselot (French: [ʒɑ̃lwi bwaslo]; 18 August 1782 – 21 May 1847) was the founder of the piano company Boisselot & Fils. Coming from a family of violin makers based in Montpellier around 1770, he started his business by selling scores and musical instruments, especially from 1809 on when he focused on the sale of pianos and harps abroad.

== Biography ==
Boisselot was born in Montpellier. After opening an office in Marseille in 1820, Boisselot settled there in 1823 and permanently devoted his time and effort to the most important part of his business, the sale of pianos, rivalling Pape, Érard and Pleyel. His older son Louis-Constantin (1809–1850) was sent on learning voyages to piano makers in Paris and Nîmes between 1826 and 1827, and again in 1834 to extend his knowledge in England. From 1830 to 1831 he, together with his son in Marseille, perfected his own piano manufacturing, presenting from the outset experienced foremen from Germany and England.

On his death in 1847, he left his two sons Louis-Constantin and Xavier Boisselot with a thriving company that sold pianos to a demanding clientele. This was also arranged by Franz Liszt himself, who played the preferred instruments of his friend and supporter Boisselot in Marseille. Following the example of his Parisian rivals, he opened the Boisselot concert hall with a concert. A grand piano built the same year by the Boisselots, was used by Liszt for several years at his Weimar residence, where most of his piano works were composed.

He died in Marseille.
