= Louis-Constantin Boisselot =

Louis-Constantin Boisselot (French: [lwi kɔ̃stɑ̃tɛ̃ bwaslo]; 11 March 1809 – 5 June 1850 in Marseille) was a French piano manufacturer and the great artisan of the creation of the house of Boisselot in Marseille.

Boisselot was born in Montpellier. He married Fortunée Funaro (1816–?), the daughter of a merchant at Marseille, on 25 November 1835. They had a son, Marie-Louis-François Boisselot (1845–1902), known simply as Franz, because he had as godfather Franz Liszt (1811–1886), a long-time friend of the family.

In 1843, he patented a piano equipped with sympathetic strings sounding an octave above, an idea that would eventually lead to Blüthner's 1873 aliquot scaling patent for grand pianos and at the Paris Exposition the following year, where he presented another piano with a "pedal tone" which preceded the "sostenuto mechanism" that Steinway re-introduced in 1874. He succeeded his father Jean-Louis Boisselot in the manufacture of pianos in 1847, a business continued by successive generations of his family until the late nineteenth century.

The collections of the Klassik Stiftung Weimar include around fifty historical musical instruments. A highlight is the grand piano from the Boisselot & Fils workshop (Marseille 1846), which was given to Franz Liszt as a gift and on which the compositions of the Weimar years were created. Liszt expressed his devotion to this instrument in his letter to Xavier Boisselot in 1862: “Although the keys are nearly worn through by the battles fought upon them by the music of the past, present and future, I will never agree to change it, and have resolved to keep it until the end of my days, as a favoured work associate”.

Paul McNulty was chosen by Klassik Stiftung Weimar to make a copy of Liszt’s personal Boisselot 1846 piano. The piano was made by 200 Liszt’s celebration as a project of the South German government. Both original and copy are property of Stiftung Weimar.

== See also ==
- Xavier Boisselot
