= Ne touchez pas à la reine =

Ne touchez pas à la reine (Hands Off the Queen) is an opéra comique in three acts by French composer Xavier Boisselot after a libretto by Eugène Scribe and Gustave Vaëz. It was first staged in Paris at the Opéra-Comique on 16 January 1847.
