= Wilhelm Meinhold =

German novelist (1797–1851)

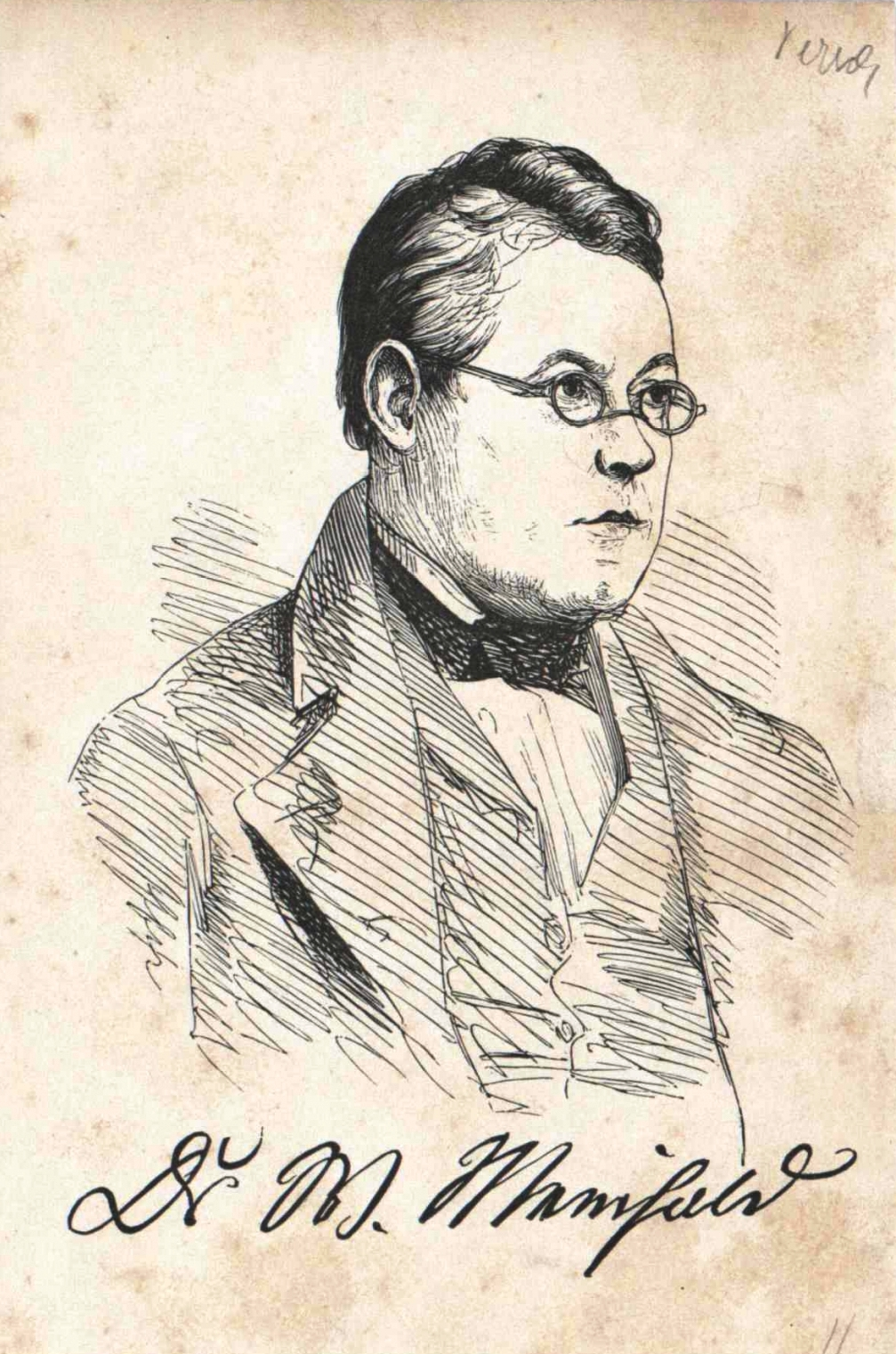
Wilhelm Meinhold

Johannes Wilhelm Meinhold (27 February 1797 – 30 November 1851) was a Pomeranian priest and author.

== Life ==
Meinhold was born in Lütow on the island of Usedom, where his father Georg Wilhelm Meinhold (1767–1728) was a Lutheran priest.

Growing up in the atmosphere of the Napoleonic Wars, he enrolled as a student at the University of Greifswald in Swedish Pomerania in the fall of 1813. After his theological education, he was priest in Koserow on Usedom from 1821 until 1827. For the next 17 years, he was priest in Krummin, also on Usedom, before he relocated to Farther Pomerania.

He retired early on account of his insubordinate behavior and died in 1851 in Berlin-Charlottenburg.

Meinhold was a poet, playwright, and novelist.

== Works ==
Meinhold's best known works are two historical Gothic romance novels:

- Maria Schweidler, die Bernsteinhexe, which was first published anonymously in 1838. It was translated into English as The Amber Witch by Lucie, Lady Duff-Gordon (1821–1869) in 1843.
- Sidonia von Bork, die Klosterhexe (1847), which was translated into English as Sidonia the Sorceress by Jane Wilde, the mother of Oscar Wilde, in 1849. The book was printed by William Morris' Kelmscott Press in 1894. (See Sidonia von Borcke.)
