= Mademoiselle Josette, My Woman (play) =

1906 play

Mademoiselle Josette, My Woman (French: Mademoiselle Josette, ma femme) is a French comic play written by Paul Gavault and Robert Charvay which premiered in 1906. Numerous film adaptations have been made of it.

The play was staged at the théâtre du Gymnase and presented as "a "situation comedy" in the manner of Scribe". It was a considerable commercial and critical success.

== Bibliography ==
- James L. Limbacher. Haven't I seen you somewhere before?: Remakes, sequels, and series in motion pictures and television, 1896-1978. Pierian Press, 1979.
