= Robert Charvay =

French dramatist and journalist (1858–1925)

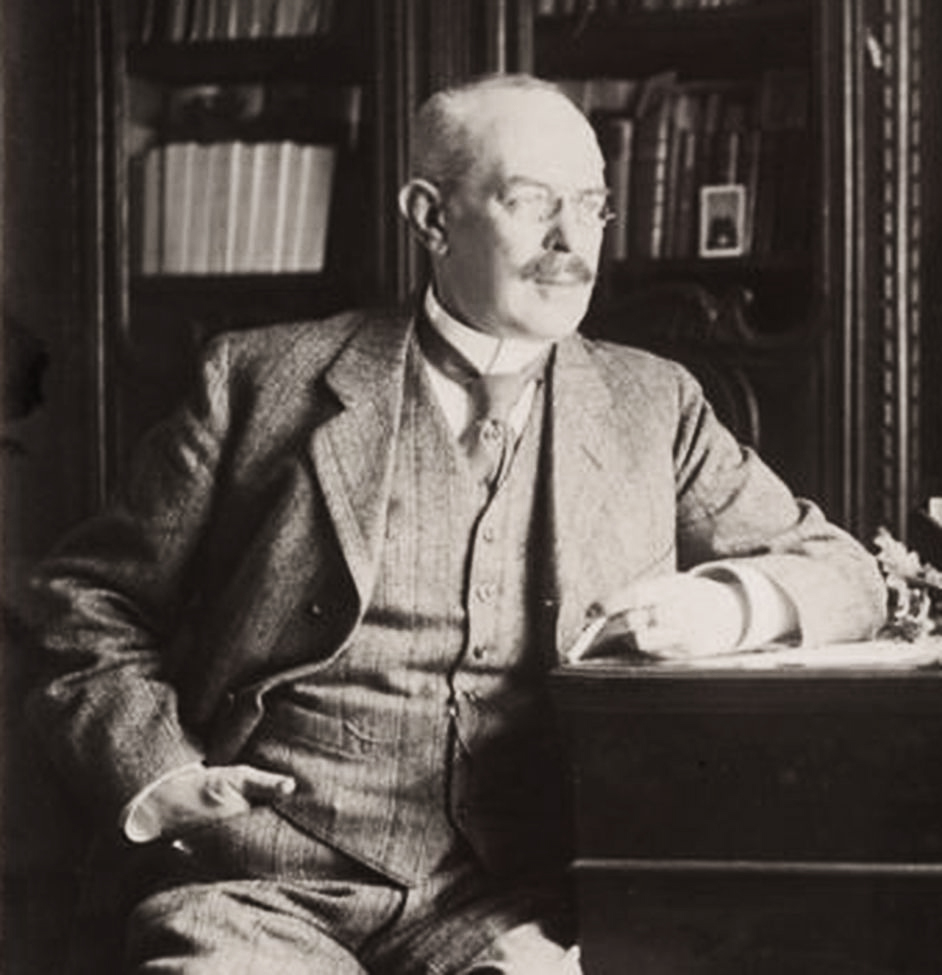
- Charvay c. 1910
- Born: Adrien Lefort; 5 March 1858
- Died: 30 December 1925 (aged 67)
- Occupations: Dramatist, journalist
- Parent: Jules Lefort (father)
- Writing career
- Pen name: Robert Charvay

Robert Charvay (5 March 1858 – 30 December 1925) is the pen name of Adrien Lefort, a French dramatist and journalist who worked for the daily Écho de Paris, where he signed his papers with the nickname Le Nain jaune (lit. 'the yellow dwarf').

He was the son of Charlotte Jeanne Judlin (1820–1883) and the French lyrical singer Jules Lefort (1822–1898). His parents divorced in 1872.

== Works as dramatist ==
- Le Fiancé de Thylda, operetta buffa in 3 acts, written with Victor de Cottens, music by Louis Varney, 1900; remade under the title Le Voyage avant la noce
- L'Enfant du miracle, comedy buffa in 3 acts written with Paul Gavault, 1903
- Papa Mulot, three acts dramatic comedy, 1904
- Mademoiselle Josette, My Woman, four acts comedy written with Paul Gavault, 1906
- Monsieur Pickwick, burlesque comedy in five acts, 1911

=== Screen adaptations ===
His comedy Mademoiselle Josette, My Woman has been adapted four times on the screen:

- Mademoiselle Josette, ma femme (1914) by André Liabel
- Mademoiselle Josette, ma femme (1926) by Gaston Ravel
- Mademoiselle Josette, ma femme (1933) by André Berthomieu
- Mademoiselle Josette, ma femme (1951) by André Berthomieu
