= Xavier Boisselot =

French composer and musical instrument manufacturer

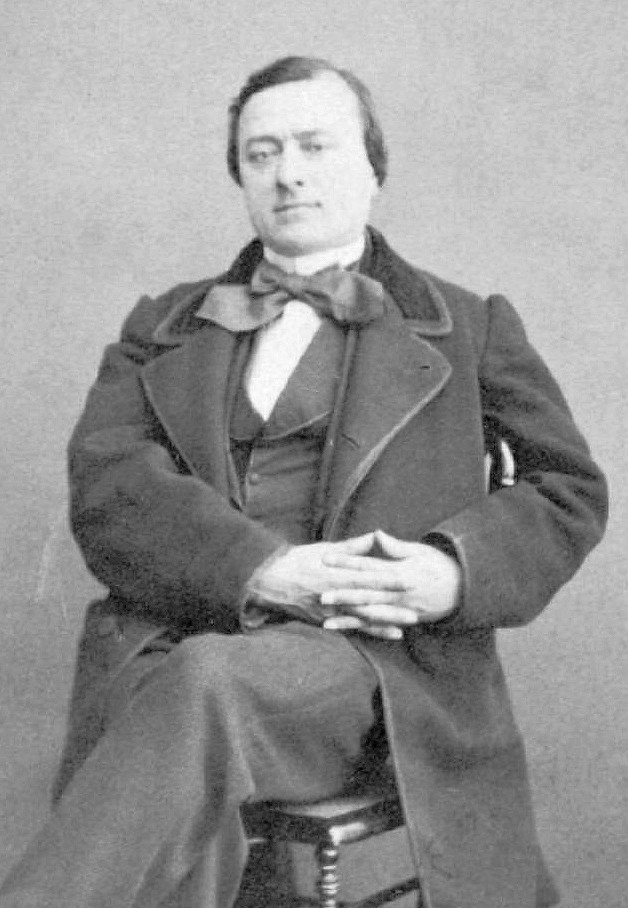
- Boisselot in 1861
- Born: Dominique-François-Xavier Boisselot; 3 December 1811; Montpellier, France
- Died: 8 April 1893 (aged 81); Paris
- Occupations: composer, piano manufacturer
- Parent: Jean-Louis Boisselot (father)
- Awards: Prix de Rome 1836

Dominique-François-Xavier Boisselot (French: [ɡzavje bwaslo]; 3 December 1811 – 8 April 1893) was a French composer and musical instrument manufacturer. He is the author of the opéra-comique in three acts Ne touchez pas à la reine to a libretto by Eugène Scribe and Gustave Vaëz. Boisselot left many art songs, including Villanella, whose text was written for Boisselot by Théophile Gautier in 1837.

== Biography ==
Born in Montpellier, the younger son of Jean-Louis Boisselot, he learned the basic elements of music in Marseille, where his family had settled after 1823. In 1830, he moved to Paris, entered the Conservatory and there followed a course in harmony. After some time studying counterpoint and fugue under François-Joseph Fétis, and composition under Jean-François Le Sueur, whose second daughter, Louise Eugénie Félicité Lesueur (1808–1884), he would marry on 17 October 1833, he won second prize in 1834 and the Prix de Rome in 1836 for his cantata Velleda, which was performed at the Conservatoire on 8 October that same year.

Despite the success of his musical debut, his career as a composer was short-lived. Boisselot had already assumed the management of his family business in Marseille and Barcelona, following the death of his brother Louis-Constantin (1809–1850), himself a successor to their father Jean-Louis (1782–1847), music publisher and musical-instrument manufacturer in Montpellier and Marseille. His achievements brought him many awards at exhibitions, such as one silver medal at the Paris Exposition of 1839, one gold medal at the French Industrial Exposition of 1844 and again at the London Great Exhibition of 1851. The quality of his grand pianos at home granted him a first class medal at the Exposition Universelle (1855), where his products were among the best of France and Spain.

Poor financial operations and the Barcelona fire of 1855 put the company in difficulty. Boisselot retired that same year and passed the management of his factories over to his nephew, Franz Boisselot (1845–1902), whose godfather was Franz Liszt, and who completely restored his business to a prosperous situation, delivering 600 to 800 pianos per year, with a large number destined for export. In 1867, he was appointed inspector-general of music schools and music theatres in Marseille. Having not abandoned his compositions, he played in 1869 in Marseille, fragments of a lyrical epic entitled L'Ange déchu.

He died in Paris.

== See also ==
- List of piano makers
- List of piano brand names
