= Country house theatre =

Country house theatres are indoor or covered performance stage theatres built within or in the grounds of a country house. Examples include:

- Chatsworth House Theatre — created in 1896 by William Hemsley for the 8th Duke of Devonshire by converting the East Wing's Banqueting Room, seats about 200.
- Stanford Hall (Loughborough) Theatre — built in 1936 by Cecil Aubrey Massey and Redding & Smith for Sir Julian Cahn, seats 350.
- Craig-y-Nos Castle Patti Theatre — opened in 1891 for Adelina Patti, who had purchased the castle in 1878, it was modelled on the Theatre Royal, Drury Lane in London and La Scala in Milan, and is the base of the Opera School Wales, seats 150.
- Capesthorne Hall Theatre - opened in the 19th century Victorian era, seats 150.
- Glyndebourne House Theatre - built in 1992-4 and seating 1,200, replaced the original 1934 theatre built by the Christie family.
- The Grange Festival auditorium at The Grange, Hampshire — converted during 1998-2003 within Cockerell's 1823-5 Greek revival Conservatory in the form of an Ionic temple, seats 530.
- Banks Fee Opera House, Longborough — built in about 1997 by Martin Graham by converting an old chicken barn, seats 500.
- Nevill Holt Hall Theatre — built in the 2000s within the 17th century stable courtyard by Carphone Warehouse co-founder David Ross, seats 300.
- Buscot Park Theatre — located in the Eastern Pavilion at the side of the main house, seats 64.
- Pyrford Court Theatre — built in 1910, with the house, for the Earl of Iveagh.
- Plas Glynllifon Theatre room - in the North wing, being restored in 2017.
- Kilworth House Theatre - an open-air theatre, seating 540, established in 2007 by the owner of Kilworth House Hotel, Lutterworth Road, North Kilworth Leicestershire. It was the first to be built in the grounds of a UK hotel with seating and stage covered by a sail like canopy and is dedicated to presenting large scale professional musical theatre and one night shows.
- Wormsley Park Garsington Opera (formerly at Garsington Manor) — 600-seat pavilion assembled and dismantled each season.
- Holland House Holland Park Opera — 1,000 seats under a canopy installed in 1988, assembled and dismantled each season.

== Sources ==
- Wilmore, David, "Curtain's Up, Your Grace", Country Life, 22/29 December 2005, pp. 42-47.
- The Culture Show, BBC TV, 9 March 2006, 8-minute segment on Chatsworth's theatre history and its reopening to the public later in 2006.

== See also ==
- Country house opera
