= Craig-y-Nos =

Craig-y-Nos may refer to:

- Craig-y-Nos Castle, a country house in Powys
- Craig-y-Nos School, and independent primary school near Bishopston, Swansea
