= Carlotta Patti =

Italian opera singer (1835–1889)

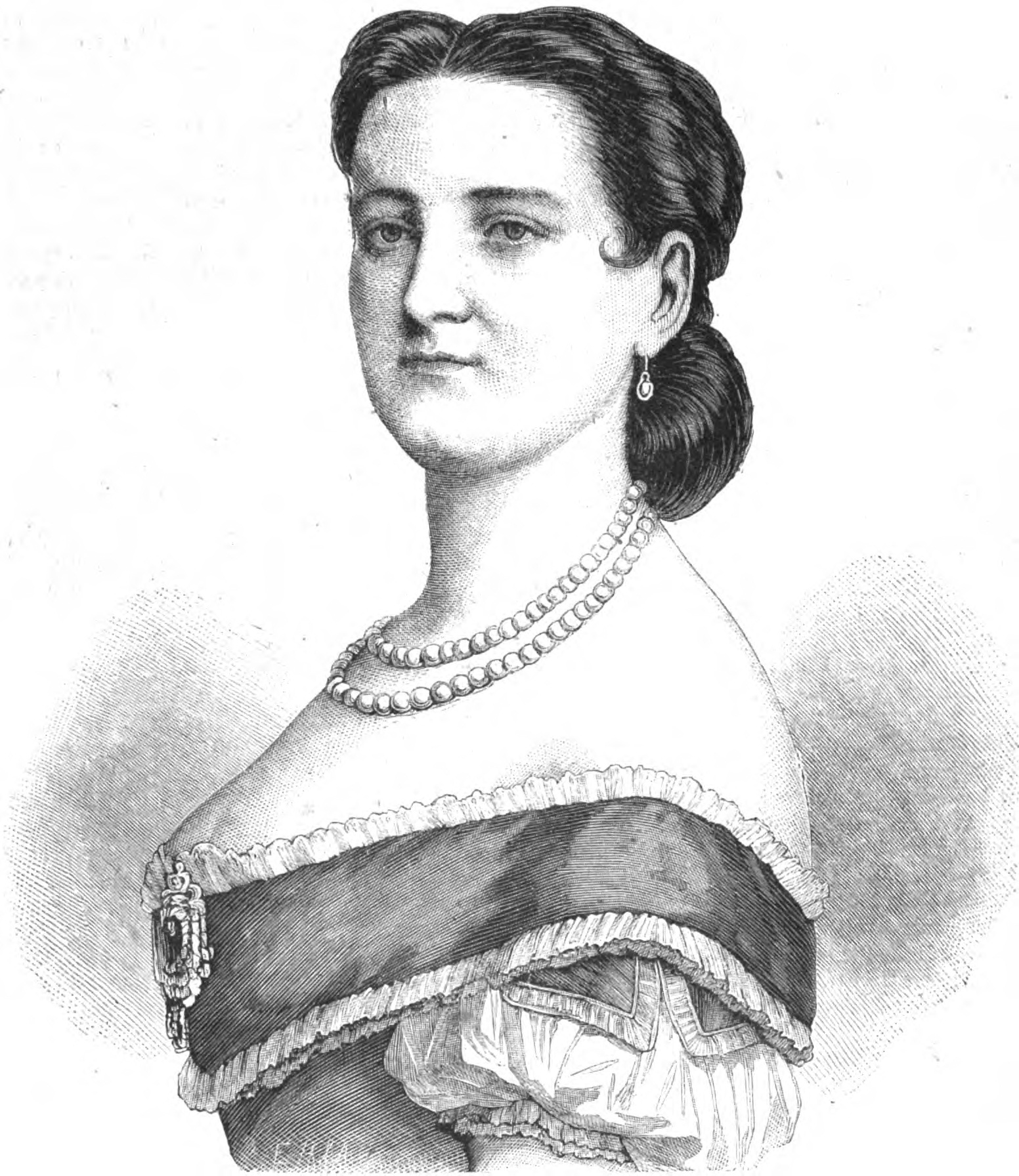
- 1865 depiction
- Born: 30 October 1835; Florence, Italy
- Died: 27 June 1889 (aged 53); Paris, France
- Occupation: Soprano
- Years active: 1861–1879
- Spouse: Ernest de Munck (m. 1879)
- Relatives: Adelina Patti (sister); Maurice Strakosch (brother-in-law); Ernesto Nicolini (brother-in-law); Effie Germon (sister-in-law)

Carlotta Patti (30 October 1835 – 27 June 1889) was an Italian operatic soprano who performed mostly in concerts. She was known for her extensive vocal range, reaching G♯ in altissimo. While not able to achieve her younger sister Adelina Patti's level of acclaim, Carlotta nonetheless received top billing in concerts in the United States, Great Britain, and Australia.

== Early life and family ==
Carlotta Patti was born to Salvatore Patti, a Sicilian tenor, and his wife Caterina Barili, a soprano, in Florence, Italy, on 30 October 1835. (Note: While various sources list her birth year as 1840 and 1842, current scholarship has confirmed her birth date as 30 October 1835.) After learning the basics of music from her mother, she studied the piano with Henri Herz before concentrating on a vocal career.

Patti had unequal leg length. (Note: This limp occurred naturally. However, it has been reported that Patti's physical disability was due to a fall, rumored to be caused by her mother or her younger sister Adelina.) Due to this condition she avoided operatic performances and preferred to sing on the concert stage. Her lack of success in opera has been attributed to her physical disability. Family friend and conductor Luigi Arditi lamented that, without that "fatal limitation [...] she would have been equally renowned with her sister."

Her younger sister Adelina Patti was a famed soprano whose second husband was tenor Ernesto Nicolini. Their older sister Amalia, also a soprano, married pianist and impresario Maurice Strakosch. Her brother Carlo (1842–1873) was a violinist who married actress Effie Germon. Through her mother's first marriage to Francesco Barili, a Roman musician, Carlotta also had four half-siblings: Ettore, Antonio, Nicolo, and Clotilda. Antonio, a music teacher, also taught Carlotta.

In 1879, Patti married the Belgian cellist Ernest de Munck.

== Career ==
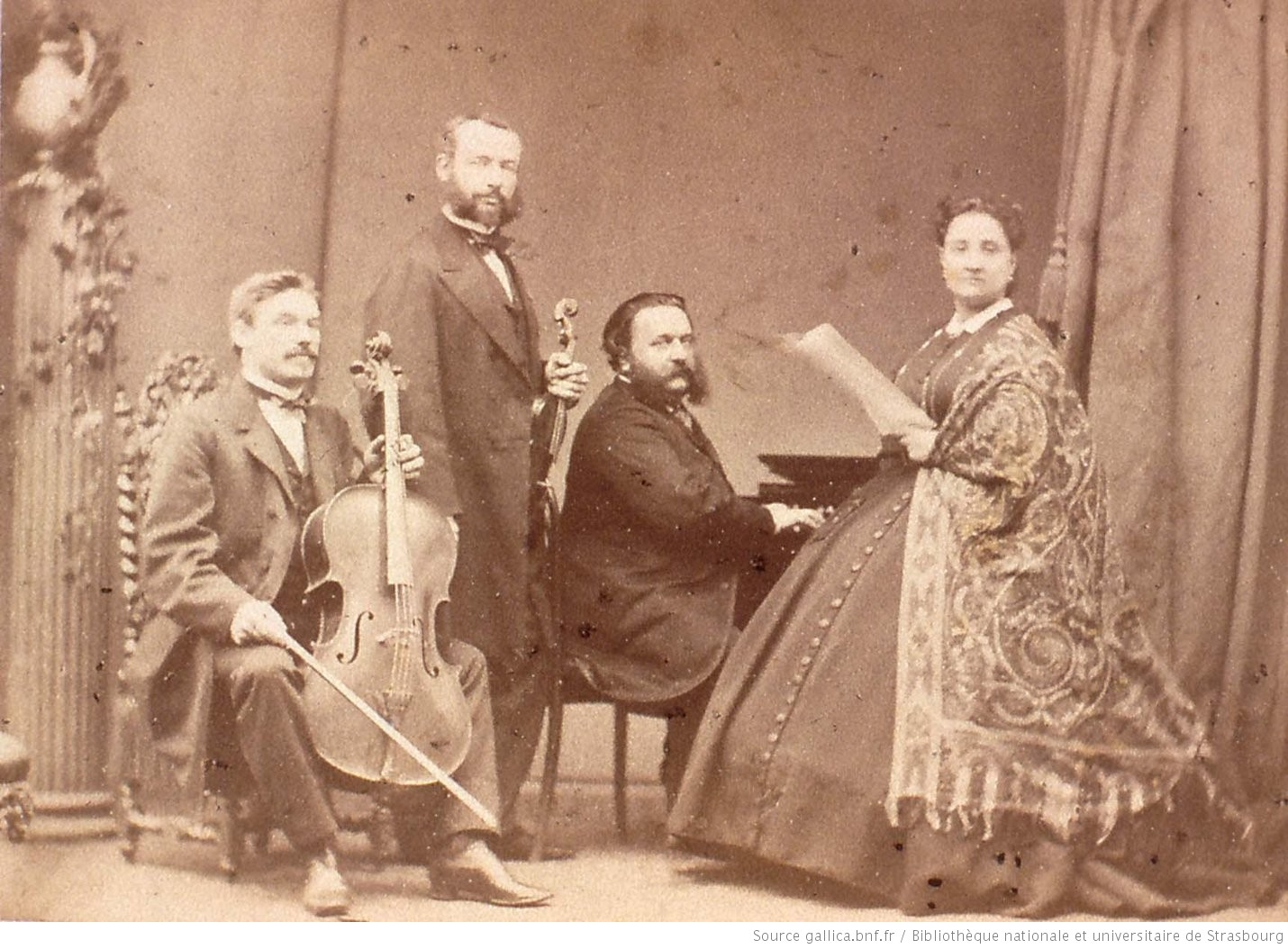
Carlo Alfredo Piatti (cello), Henri Vieuxtemps (violin), Alfred Jaëll (piano), and Patti in 1864

The Patti family moved to the United States in 1848. Patti moved to South America to nurse her older half-sister, Clotilda, who suffered a fatal illness; following her death, she returned to America and was coached vocally by Clotilda's widower, Carlo Scola. (Note: Referred to as Signor Scola, his name was Carlo Scola.) Patti made her debut in January 1861 at the Academy of Music in New York City. Patti made her Covent Garden debut on 16 April 1863. In May 1863, she performed in the Crystal Palace Concerts. Her impresarios included Bernard Ulmann (Note: His name was frequently given simply as "Ulmann", though his full name was Bernard Ulmann.) and Maurice Strakosch. In 1866, she toured, organized by Ulmann, with Jules Lefort, violinist Henri Vieuxtemps, cellist Alexandre Batta, and pianist Eugène Ketterer. She toured Europe in 1867. In 1868, she again toured with Lefort, Vieuxtemps, Jean-François Berthelier, and Félix Godefroid.

In 1869, Patti sang in the United States as part of Strakosch's company. She was praised for her performances as the Queen of the Night in Mozart's The Magic Flute. She performed in Rossini's The Barber of Seville and Don Pasquale in Buenos Aires in 1870. Patti went to America in the fall of 1872 as part of a six-member-troup, including Teresa Carreño and Émile Sauret, formed by Maurice Strakosch. They made their debut at Steinway Hall in New York before performing in Canada and Charleston, South Carolina. In 1873, she performed in Paris with Lefort.

Patti performed at the 1879 dedication of Central Music Hall in Chicago. In December 1879, Patti was reported to be drunk during a performance in Leavenworth, Kansas, though she denied this, with her manager saying she had a cold. She sued the Post-Dispatch for publishing an allegedly libelous article from the Leavenworth Times, asking for US$25,000 (equivalent to $863,839 in 2025) in damages, and later abandoned the suit.

In 1882, Patti studied voice with Hermine Küchenmeister-Rudersdorf. Patti’s students included American composer, pianist and singer Anna Ware Poole.

=== Retirement and death ===
Following her marriage to Ernest de Munck in 1879, she retired from public life and focused on teaching. Patti died of cancer in her home at Rue Pierre Charron, Paris, on 27 June 1889.

== Voice ==
Patti had a clear soprano voice with a range of C4 to G♯ in altissimo. Her high range was praised, particularly in its performance of the Queen of the Night aria from Mozart's The Magic Flute.
