= English country houses with changed use =

Many English country houses have experienced a change of use and are no longer privately occupied.

== Country houses converted to apartments ==
- Escowbeck
- Finedon Hall
- Hazelwood Hall
- Runshaw Hall
- Thurland Castle
- Woodfold Hall

== Country houses converted to luxury hotels ==
- Cliveden
- Coworth House
- The Grove, Watford
- Hartwell House
- Peckforton Castle
- Shaw Hill
- Taymouth Castle
- Thurnham Hall
- Wyresdale Hall

== Country houses used as schools or for other educational purposes ==
- Alston Hall
- Ashridge House
- Bramshill House
- Culford Park
- Dartington Hall
- Harlaxton Manor
- Heslington Hall
- Hinchingbrooke House
- Rossall Hall
- Prior Park
- Scarisbrick Hall
- Stowe House
- Townhill Park House
- Tring Park Mansion
- Westonbirt House
- Wennington Hall

== Country houses used for religious purposes ==
- Capernwray Hall
- Taplow Court

== Country houses used as hospitals or residential care homes ==
- Cuernden Hall
- Gisburne Hall, private hospital
- Leckhampton Court
- Littledale Hall
- Wrightington Hall, NHS hospital

== Country houses run as museums or art galleries ==
- Astley Hall, museum and art gallery
- Compton Verney, art gallery
- Cusworth Hall, The museum of South Yorkshire Life
- Duff House, outstation of the National Gallery of Scotland
- Lytham Hall, run by English Heritage
- Paxton House, outstations of the National Gallery of Scotland
- Samlesbury Hall, run by trust
- Saint Fagans Castle, National Museum of History
- Temple Newsam House, a museum of the decorative arts
- Towneley Park, museum and art gallery
- Turton Tower, run by Blackburn Council
- Wollaton Hall, natural history museum.

== Country houses used for other purposes ==
- Alton Towers, amusement park.
- Drayton Manor, Drayton Manor Theme Park amusement park
- Donington Hall, office
- Hewell Grange, open prison
- Heskin Hall, antiques centre
- Waddow Hall, Girlguiding centre
- Winmarleigh Hall, children's activity centre
- Wyresdale Park, barn wedding venue and business centre

== Other uses ==
The National Portrait Gallery (London) has several outstations at country houses: Montacute House is partially used to display Elizabethan and Jacobean portraits; Beningbrough Hall is used to display 18th-century portraits and Bodrhyddan Hall displays 19th-century portraits.

Knebworth House stages rock concerts in the park. Glyndebourne has an opera house attached. Port Lympne is now a zoo, several houses also have Safari parks in the grounds: Knowsley Hall (The house has never been open to the public), Longleat & Woburn Abbey. Clouds House is used as a centre for treating alcoholics and drug addicts. Moor Park is a golf club-house. Halton House is used by the Royal Air Force and Minley Manor was used by the army. Another common use of country houses is to convert them for multiple occupation, for example New Wardour Castle, Sheffield Park House & Stoneleigh Abbey whose former park Stoneleigh Park is used for exhibitions and agricultural shows. Culzean Castle, Margam Castle & Tatton Hall are at the centre of country parks. Goodwood House is a centre of both horse & motor racing. Ince Blundell Hall is now a nunnery. Toddington Manor is being convert into an art gallery and home by Damien Hirst. Many houses are now in the ownership of Local government and operated as country house museums including Ashton Court, Aston Hall being the first to be so owned from 1864, Cardiff Castle, Heaton Hall & Tredegar House. Ditchley is owned and used for conferences by the Ditchley Foundation.
