= Opera School Wales =

The Opera School Wales (Welsh: Ysgol Opera Cymru) is a postgraduate training school for operatic performers. The school is based in Craig-y-Nos, south Powys, Wales.

The Opera School Wales was formed by Brendan Wheatley and Bridgett Gill in 1987 when the school offered its first residential postgraduate training course in Brecon, Powys.

Since 2002 the school has been based at Craig-y-Nos, a Gothic castle once occupied by Italian soprano singer Adelina Patti.
