= Emilio Pizzi =

Italian composer (1861–1940)

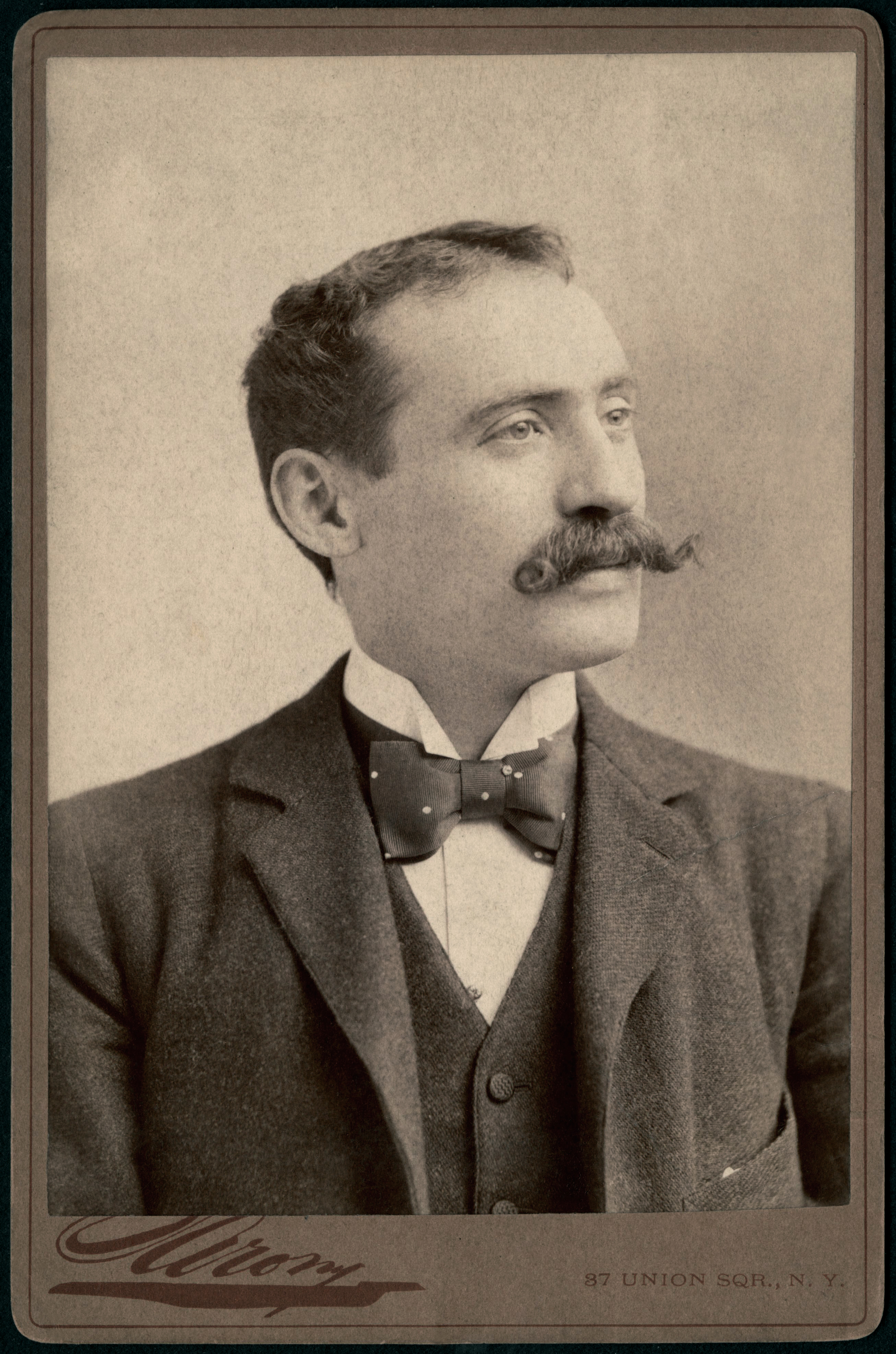
Portrait of Emilio Pizzi, ca. 1890

Emilio Pizzi (1 February 1861 – 27 November 1940) was an Italian composer. His output of works includes 10 operas, a ballet, an oratorio, and numerous vocal and chamber works.

Pizzi graduated from the Milan Conservatory in 1884 where he was a pupil of Antonio Bazzini and Amilcare Ponchielli and attended classes with Pietro Mascagni. Shortly after completing his education, he moved to London where he remained for almost 13 years. In 1885 his operetta Lina won the Bonetti Competition. In 1889 his first opera, Guglielmo Ratcliff, won first prize at the Baruzzi Competition. His fourth opera, Gabriella, was commissioned by Adelina Patti and she portrayed the title role when the work premiered in Boston in 1893 at the Metropolitan Theatre with the composer in attendance.

Pizzi returned to Italy in 1897 to succeed Antonio Cesaro as the maestro di cappella at the Santa Maria Maggiore in Bergamo. He also taught at the Bergamo Conservatory. He returned to London in 1900, where he became a popular composer of vocal pieces. He died in Milan at the age of 79.

== Operas ==
- Lina (1885)
- Guglielmo Ratcliff (1889, Bologna)
- Editha (1890, Milan)
- Viviana (early 1890s, never performed)
- Gabriella (1893, Boston)
- The bric-a-brac-Will (1895, London)
- Ultimo canto (1896, Vienna)
- Rosalba (1899, Turin)
- La vendetta (1906, Cologne)
- Ivania (1926, Bergamo)

== Sources ==
- Operisti minori dell'800 italiano By Corrado Ambìveri
