= John Gibbs Gilbert =

American actor

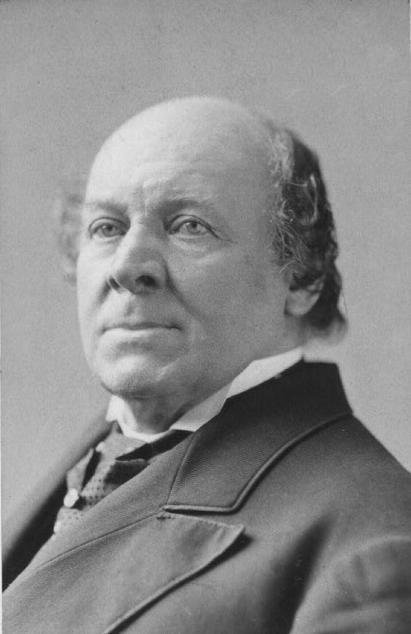

John Gibbs Gilbert (February 27, 1810 – June 17, 1889) was an American stage actor.

== Biography ==
John Gibbs Gilbert was born in Boston on February 27, 1810, the son of John Neal and Elizabeth Gilbert (née Atkins). He made his first appearance there at the Tremont Theatre, in 1828, as Jaffier in Otway's Venice Preserved. His original aim was to be a tragedian, but while on a tour through the South and West, the success of his Sir Anthony Absolute, Master Walter, etc., convinced him that his true bent was for "old men" parts, and he soon became the leading American actor in that line of comedy. In 1834, he again came forward at the Tremont Theatre, Acting Mr. Dornton in The Road to Ruin. The occasion was that of a benefit to George Barrett — a favorite comedian of that epoch. The Tremont was managed then by Thomas Barry, who died on February 11, 1876, full of years and honors. Gilbert remained at the Tremont Theatre five years. The versatility of his talents and the variety of his efforts at that time are denoted by the list of parts which he acted during the first season with Barry. This includes Master Walter, Isaac of York, Sir Peter Teazle, Pizarro, Iago, Sir Edward Mortimer, Admiral Kingston, Lieutenant Worthington, Sir Robert Bramble, Polonius, Uncle John, Tom Noddy, Macduff, Mr. Dornton, Squeers, King Henry the Sixth, Adam, Malec, Kent and Rolanio.

In 1847 he had a successful engagement in London. From 1862 until the close of Wallack's Theatre, New York, he was connected with that house. In December 1872, he appeared there with actress Effie Germon in a production of Brother Sam. His most famous role was that of Sir Peter Teazle in The School for Scandal; his Sir Anthony, Old Dornton in The Road to Ruin and Lord Ogleby in The Clandestine Marriage were also noted.

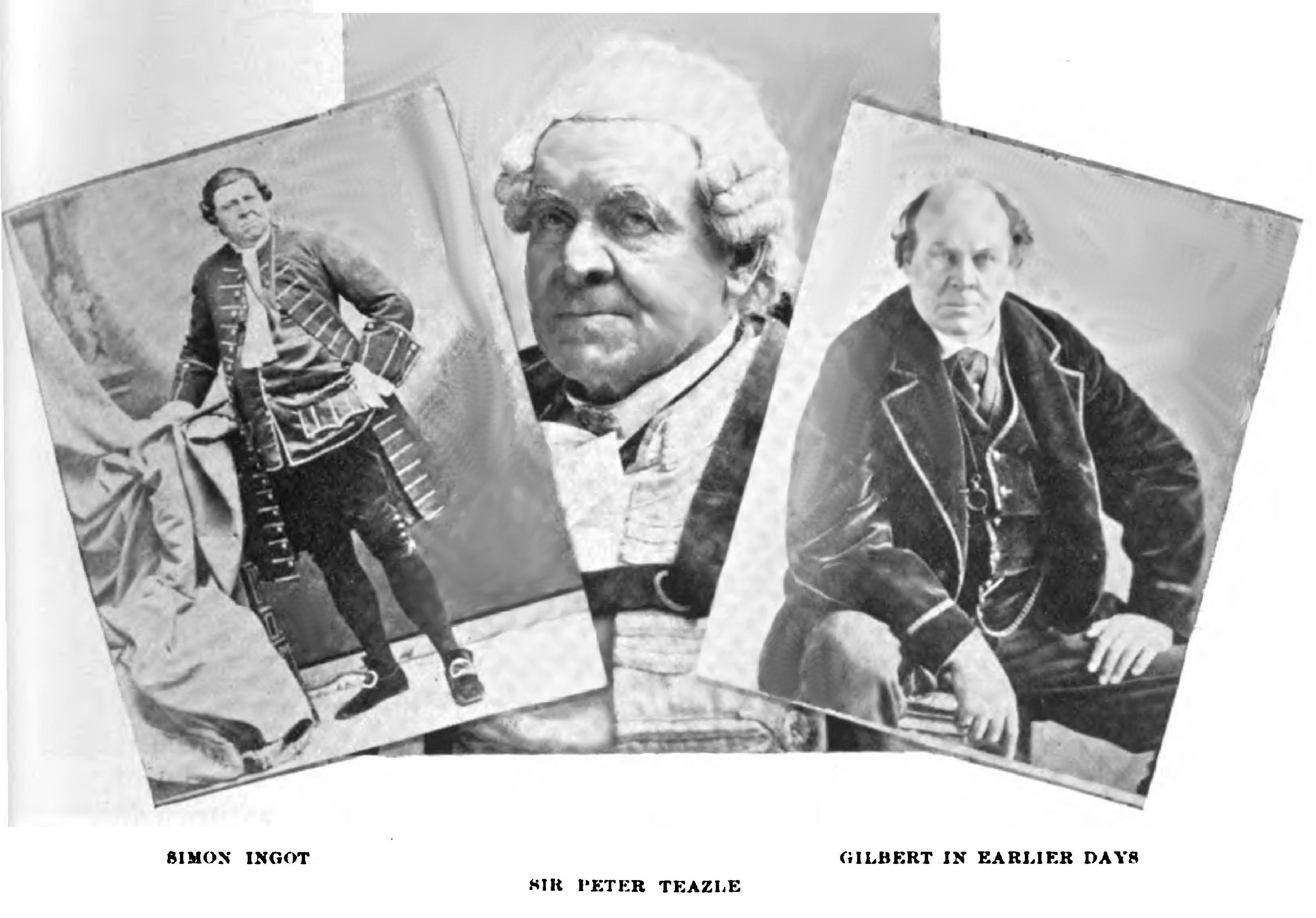
John Gibbs Gilbert in various roles

He died in Boston on June 17, 1889.

== Publications ==
- Winter, A Sketch of the Life of John Gilbert, Dunlap Society Publications (New York, 1890)
- McKay and Wingate, Famous American Actors of To-Day (New York, 1896)
- Carroll, Twelve Americans: Their Lives and Times (New York, 1893)

== Sources ==
- Genealogy.com
