= Patti Pavilion =

- Interactive map of the Patti Pavilion area

General information
- Location: Victoria Park, Swansea, Wales
- Coordinates: 51.612493°N 3.963658°W
- Named for: Adelina Patti
- Relocated: 1918
- Renovated: 2009
- Renovation cost: £3m

The Patti Pavilion is a venue for the performing arts in Swansea, Wales, located at Victoria Park to the south west of Swansea City Centre. The theatre stages plays, pantomimes, musical shows and fairs.

== History ==
The venue is named after Adelina Patti, the great 19th-century opera soprano. The building was originally used as a winter garden at Patti's Craig-y-Nos estate. In its original function and design the pavilion had a glass roof. Patti donated the building to the city (then town) of Swansea in 1918 and it was relocated to Victoria Park. It is a Grade II listed building.

In 1994, it was given a superficial makeover by the BBC's Challenge Anneka. Already falling into disrepair, the building was further damaged by a suspected arson attack in 2006 The pavilion underwent a major £3m overhaul in 2009 after it became clear that it was not being utilised to its full potential. The project was funded by the City & County of Swansea. Work began in late 2007 to extend the Patti Pavilion with a new glass covered wing housing an Indian restaurant; Patti Raj, which has subsequently been rebranded as Adelinas Bar and Indian Kitchen.

Rock bands that have played at the Patti Pavilion include Jefferson Starship, Man, Spider, Mountain (with Leslie West and Corky Laing), Hayseed Dixie and Scouting for Girls. Other bands that have played the venue include: Phil Campbell and the Bastard sons, Quireboys, Discharge, Big Country, Massive Wagons, Fozzy, Goldie Looking chain, FM and Reef
