= Ernest de Munck =

Belgian cellist and composer (1840–1915)

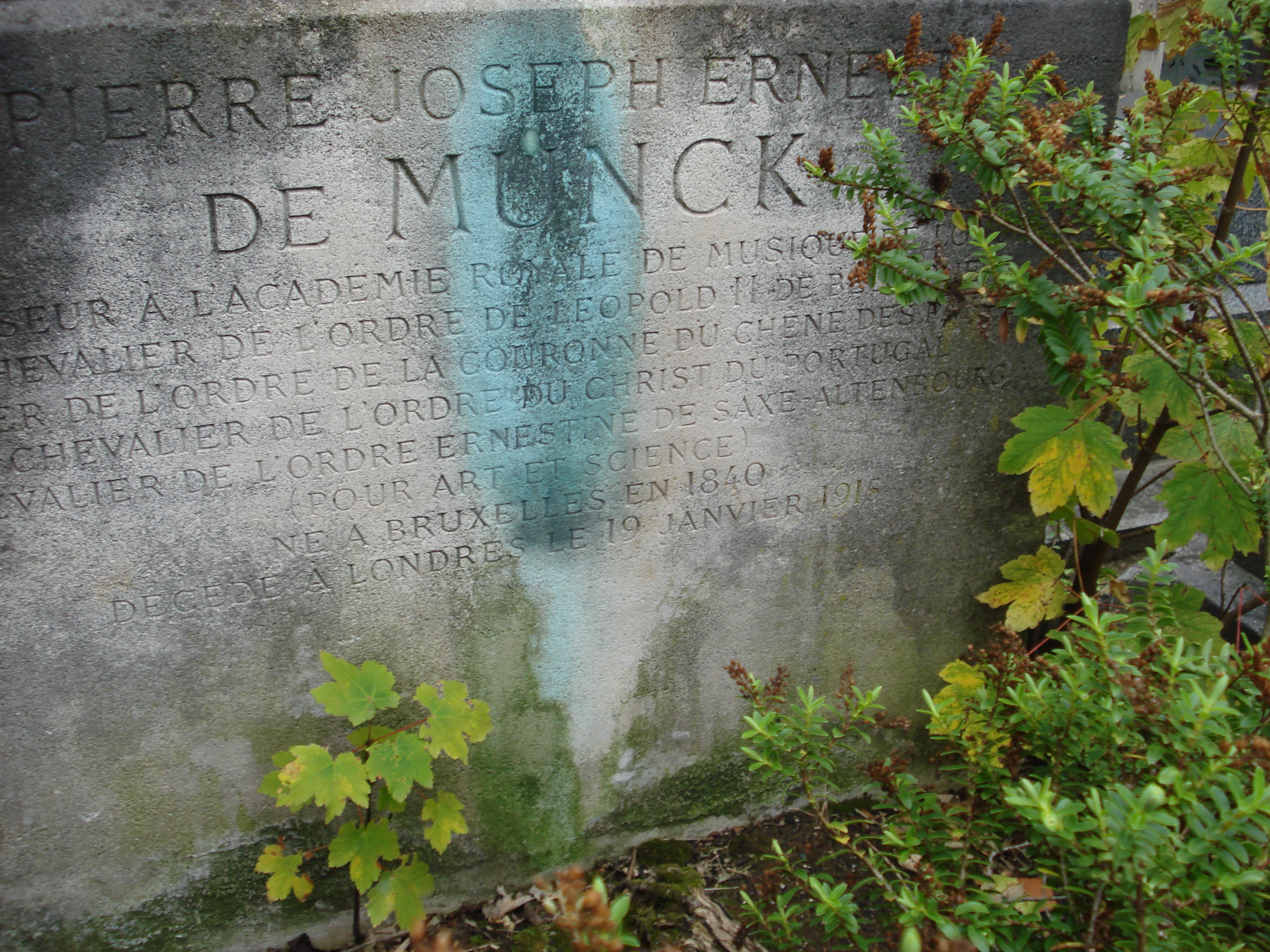
- De Munck's tombstone at the Montmartre Cemetery
- Born: December 21, 1840; Brussels, Belgium
- Died: January 19, 1915 (aged 74); Maida Vale, London, England
- Occupations: Cellist; composer
- Spouse: Carlotta Patti (m. 1879; died 1889)
- Father: François de Munck

Ernest de Munck (December 21, 1840 – January 19, 1915) was a Belgian cellist and composer. Born in Brussels, de Munck learned the cello from his professional cellist father François de Munck as well as Adrien-François Servais. He later became a professor at the Royal Academy of Music and the Guildhall School of Music in London.

== Life ==
Ernest de Munck was born on December 21, 1840, in Brussels. His father François de Munck was a virtuoso cellist and teacher, once a member of the orchestra at Her Majesty's Theatre and a professor at the Royal Conservatory of Brussels. He was taught the cello by his father and by Adrien-François Servais. He toured Great Britain in 1855. In 1868, de Munck became a permanent member of the Maurin String Quartet in Paris. De Munck was awarded the Goldene Ehrenmedaille für Kunst und Wissenschaft in 1876.

On September 3, 1879, he married singer Carlotta Patti. They performed together throughout the United States, such as in St. Louis, and he was part of her company on her concert tours in the country. They also lived in the US for a period. Patti died in Paris in 1889. Following her death, de Munck moved to London where he became a professor at the Guildhall School of Music in 1891, and a professor at the Royal Academy of Music in 1893.

De Munck died in Maida Vale, London, on January 19, 1915. His death was announced on February 5.

=== De Munck cello ===
In 1869, Ernest de Munck acquired a 1730 Stradivarius cello from Auguste Franchomme through the intermediary of Gand et Bernardel of Paris. Before his death in 1915, de Munck sold it to one of his students, C. H. Heriot, who subsequently sold it to W. E. Hill & Sons. Emanuel Feuermann bought it in 1939, and it was acquired by collector Russel B. Kingman upon Feuermann's death. The cello was then owned again by W. E. Hill & Sons, then dealer Rembert Wurlitzer, before being sold to cellist Aldo Parisot. The Nippon Music Foundation has owned the cello since 1996. The cello bears his name, as well as Feuermann's.

== Music ==
- Ivan Gondois (c. 1888)
- Polonaise for cello and piano, dedicated to Princess Louise, Marchioness of Lorne (c. 1898)
- Six Études in the Form of Caprices

== Honors ==
- Chevalier of the Order of Leopold II
- Chevalier of the Order of Christ
- Officer of the Order of the Oak Crown
- Officer of the Saxe-Ernestine House Order
