= Effie Germon =

American actress

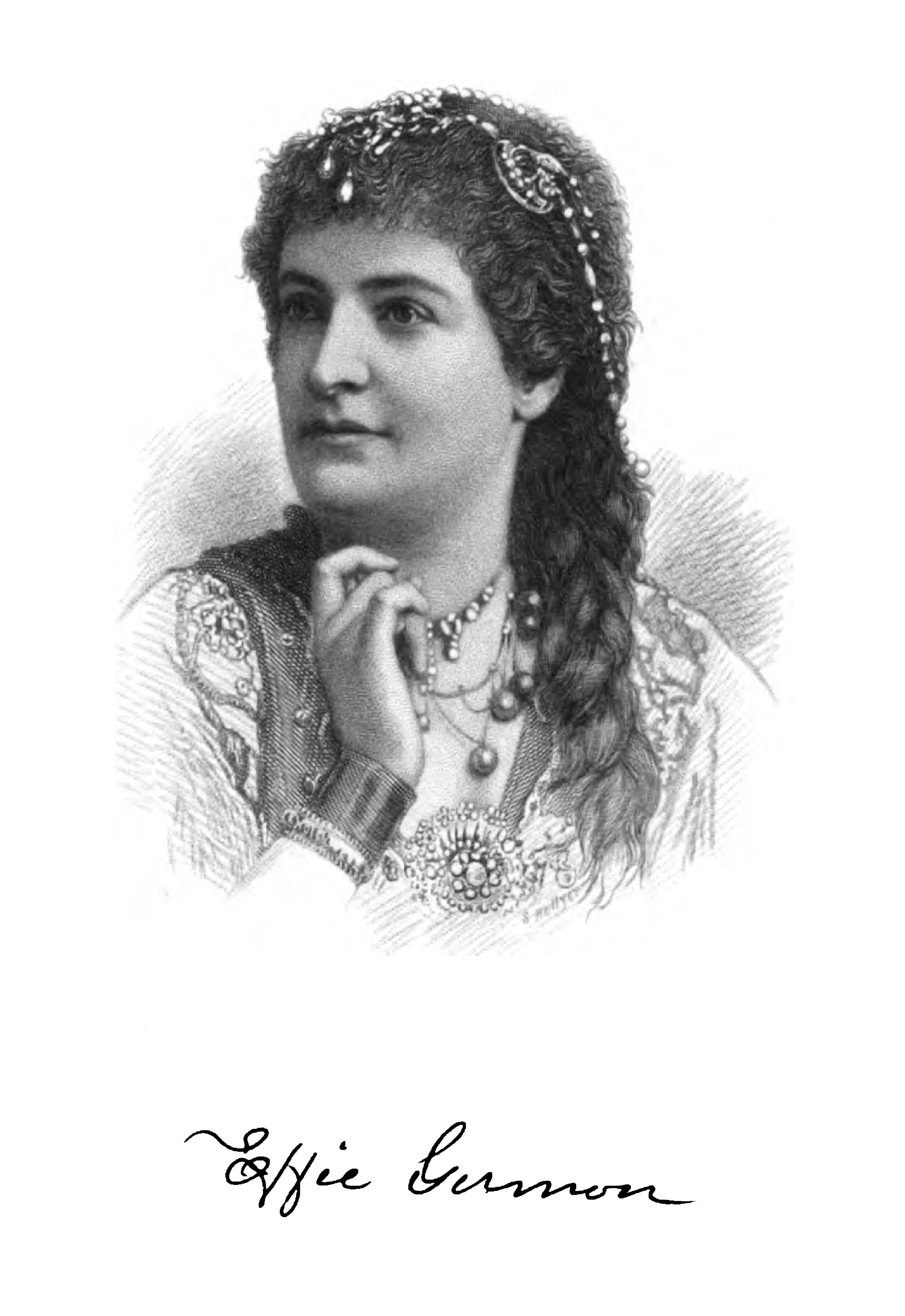
- Born: Mary Euphemia Germon; June 13, 1845; Augusta, Georgia, U.S.
- Died: March 6, 1914 (aged 68); Staten Island, New York, U.S.
- Occupation: Actress

Mary Euphemia "Effie" Germon (June 13, 1845 – March 6, 1914) was an American stage actress of the late 19th century from Augusta, Georgia, a descendant of the Germons of Baltimore who were an old theatrical family. She excelled as a soubrette.

== Early life ==
One of six siblings born to actors Greenberry Carr "Greene" Germon and Jane (née Anderson) Germon, her father was the first to perform the role of Uncle Tom at the Troy Museum in the George Aiken adaptation of Uncle Tom's Cabin produced by George C. Howard. Effie Germon had two brothers. Her mother, Jane, a cousin of actor Joe Jefferson, began her career at age 8 and continued for 50 years.

Effie Germon's theatrical debut was made at the Holliday Street Theatre in Baltimore, Maryland, during the 1857–58 season. She played "Sally Scraggs" in Sketches in India. Germon acted with both the Baltimore and Philadelphia stock companies.

== Marriage, return to the stage ==
She left the theater to marry, at a very early age, violinist Carlo Patti (brother of Adelina Patti and Carlotta Patti), whom she married at Providence, Rhode Island. Germon returned to prominence at the Chestnut Street Theatre during the theatrical season of 1863–64. She made her first appearance on the New York City stage which opened in 1869 under the management of John Brougham. She appeared with John Gibbs Gilbert at Wallack's Theatre in a production of Brother Sam in December 1872.

At the same venue she acted with Richard Mansfield in Prince Karl, the original production of Little Lord Fauntleroy. She paired with Francis Wilson in Erminie. During the 1906–07 season, she performed on the road in Sunday. After divorcing Patti, she remarried to comedian Nelse Seymour.

== Lincoln assassination ==
She was performing in Aladdin at Grover's Theatre in Washington, D.C., on the evening when Abraham Lincoln was assassinated at Ford's Theatre. While she was singing "Sherman Has Marched To The Sea", C.D. Hess, manager of Grover's Theatre, learned of the shooting of Lincoln. A week earlier, Germon was present when John Wilkes Booth came into the office of Hess and inquired as to when Lincoln would attend a performance of Aladdin. The President had been invited and had promised to attend. The President's son, Tad Lincoln attended in his place. A photo of Germon was found on Booth when he was shot dead at Richard H. Garrett's farm in 1865.

== Death ==
Germon died at the Actors' Fund Home in Staten Island, New York in 1914, aged 68, and was interred in Evergreens Cemetery in the Actors' Fund Plot.
