= English country house =

Larger house or mansion estate in England

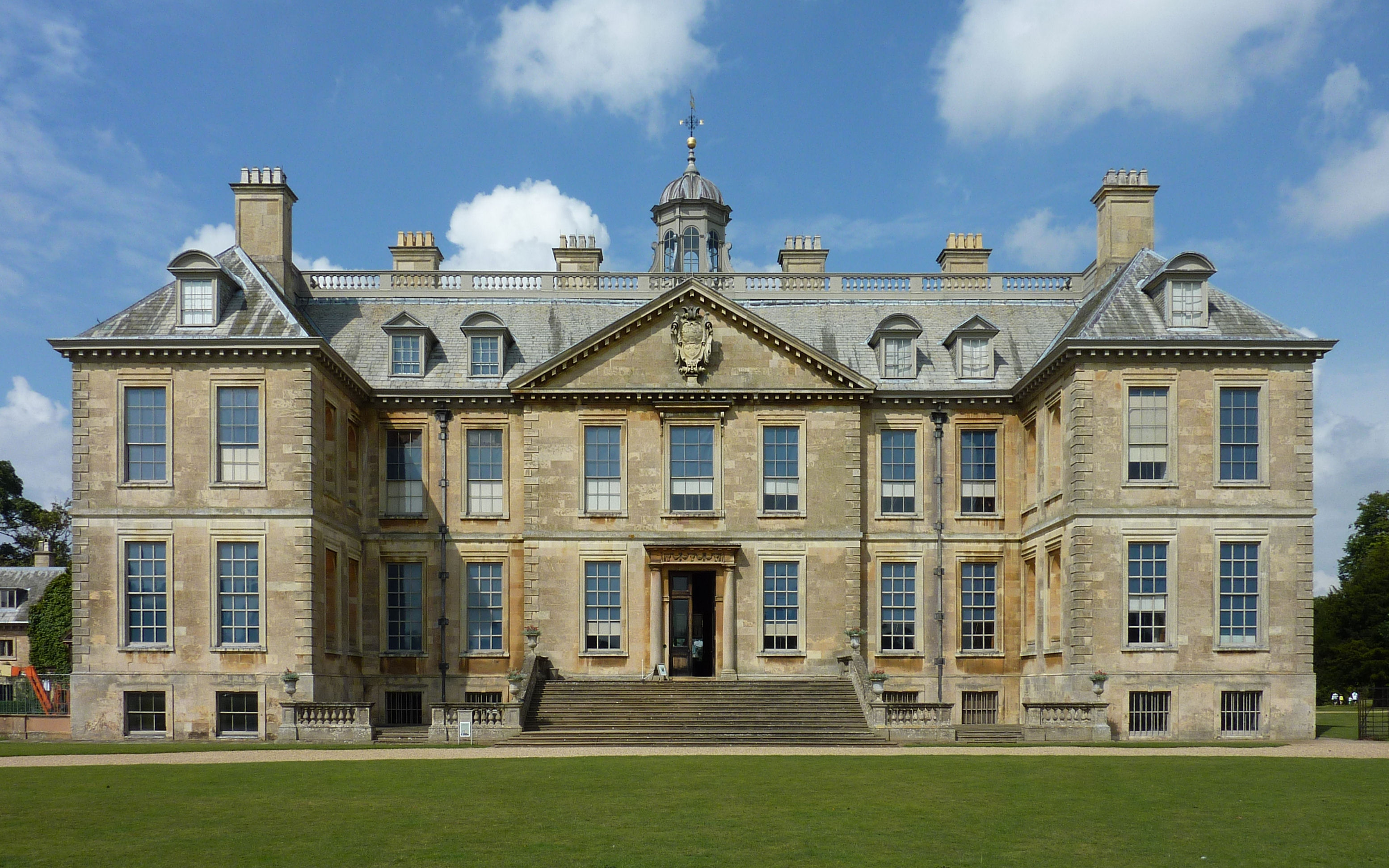
Belton House in Lincolnshire is considered a complete example of a typical English country house. It was built between 1685 and 1687 by Sir John Brownlow, 3rd Baronet.

An English country house is a large house or mansion in the English countryside. Such houses were often owned by individuals who also owned a town house. This allowed them to spend time in the country and in the city—hence, for these people, the term distinguished between town and country.

However, many were, and often still are, the full-time residence for the landed gentry who dominated rural England until the Reform Act 1832. Frequently, the formal business of the counties was transacted in these country houses, having functional antecedents in manor houses.

With large numbers of indoor and outdoor staff, country houses were important as places of employment for many rural communities. In turn, until the agricultural depressions of the 1870s, the estates, of which country houses were the hub, provided their owners with incomes. The late 19th and early 20th centuries were the swansong of the traditional English country house lifestyle. Increased taxation and the effects of World War I led to the demolition of hundreds of houses; those that remained had to adapt to survive.

While a château or a Schloss can be fortified or unfortified, a country house, similar to an Ansitz, is usually unfortified. Some English country houses were given castellated designs, but many buildings with "castle" in their name—such as Highclere Castle—were never fortified; in such cases, the title reflects architectural fashion rather than defence.

== Stately homes of England ==
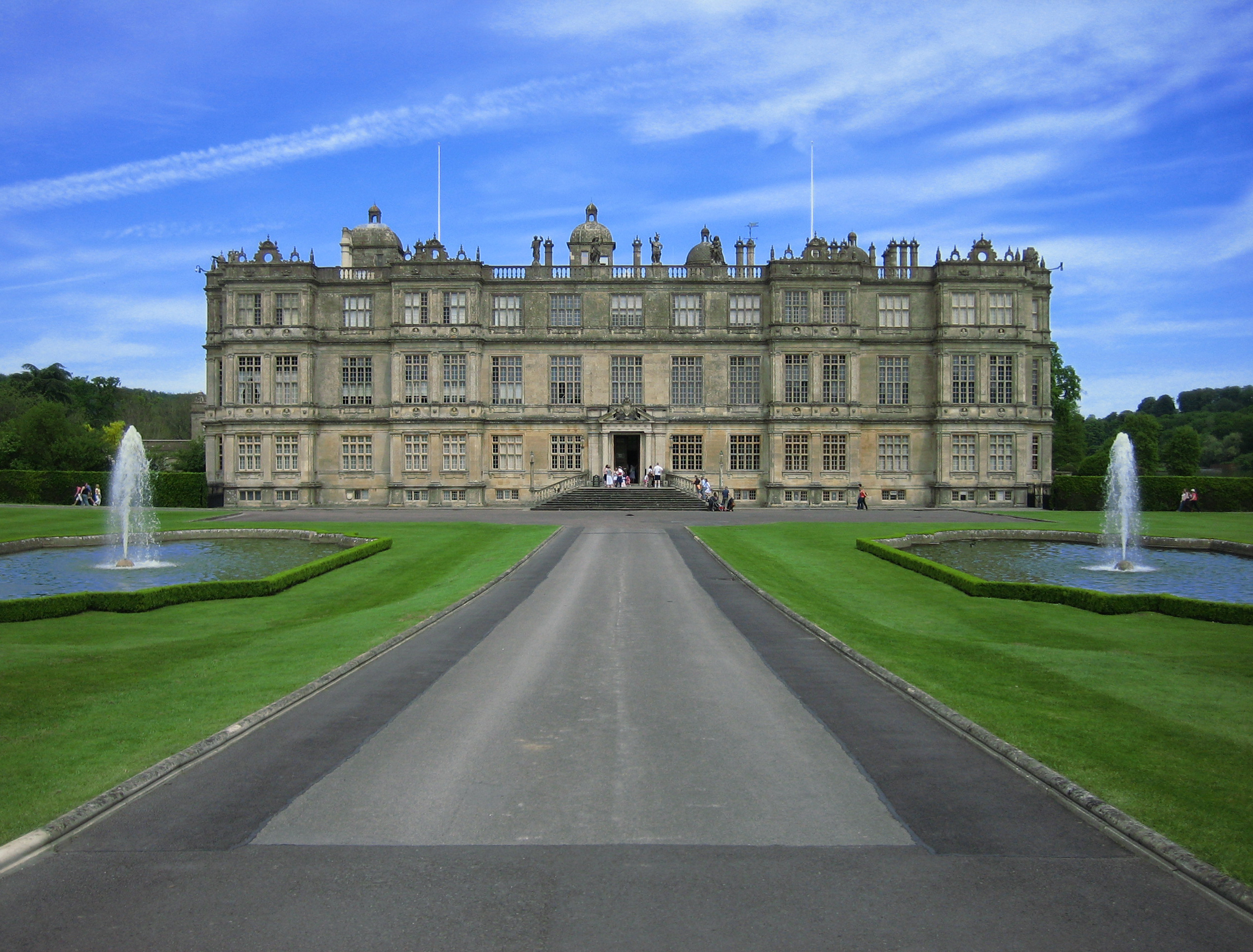
Longleat in Wiltshire is widely regarded as one of the finest examples of Elizabethan architecture in Britain. In the 20th century, it opened to paying visitors in 1949, becoming one of the first country houses to do so; the estate later established the first drive-through safari park outside Africa in 1966.

The term stately home is subject to debate, and is generally avoided by historians and academics. As a description of a country house, it was first used in a poem by Felicia Hemans, "The Homes of England", published in Blackwood's Magazine in 1827, and later popularised in a song by Noël Coward.

In England, the terms "country house" and "stately home" are sometimes used interchangeably; however, many country houses such as Ascott in Buckinghamshire were deliberately designed to harmonise with the landscape rather than to impress, while others such as Kedleston Hall and Holkham Hall were built as "power houses" intended to dominate it.

In his book Historic Houses: Conversations in Stately Homes, Robert Harling documents nineteen "stately homes" ranging from the vast Blenheim Palace and Castle Howard to the minuscule Ebberston Hall, and from the Jacobean Renaissance of Hatfield House to the eccentricities of Sezincote.

The book's collection of stately homes also includes George IV's Brighton town palace, the Royal Pavilion.

== Sizes and types ==
Wealthy and influential people, often bored with their formal duties, go to the country in order to get out of London, the ugliest and most uncomfortable city in the world; they invented the long week-end to stay away as long as possible. Their métier is politics; they talk politics; and they make politics, quite spontaneously.

— John Gunther, 1940

=== Power houses ===
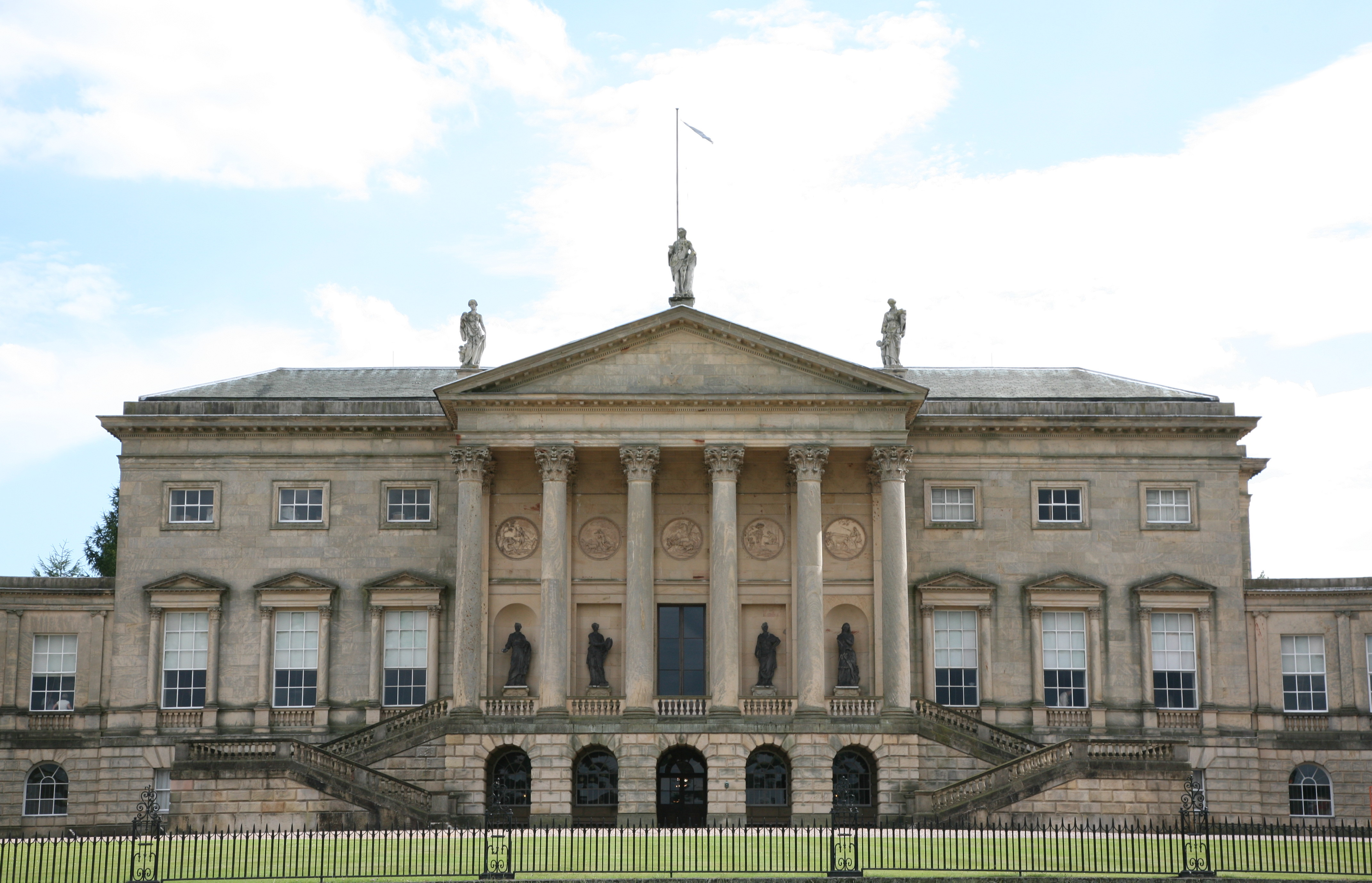
Kedleston Hall in Derbyshire, designed by Matthew Brettingham and Robert Adam, one of the great power houses.

The great houses are the largest of the country houses; in truth palaces, built by the country's most powerful – these were designed to display their owners' power or ambitions to power. Very large unfortified or barely fortified houses began to take over from the traditional castles of the crown and magnates during the Tudor period, with vast houses such as Hampton Court Palace and Burghley House, and continued until the 18th century with houses such as Castle Howard, Kedleston Hall and Holkham Hall. Such building reached its zenith from the late 17th century until the mid-18th century. These houses were often completely built or rebuilt in their entirety by one eminent architect in the most fashionable architectural style of the day and often have a suite of Baroque state apartments, typically in enfilade, reserved for the most eminent guests, the entertainment of whom was of paramount importance in establishing and maintaining the power of the owner. The common denominator of this category of English country houses is that they were designed to be lived in with a certain degree of ceremony and pomp. It was not unusual for the family to have a small suite of rooms for withdrawing in privacy away from the multitude that lived in the household. These houses were always an alternative residence to a London house.

During the 18th and 19th centuries, for the highest echelons of English society, the country house served as a place for relaxing, hunting and running the country with one's equals at the end of the week, with some houses having their own theatre where performances were staged.

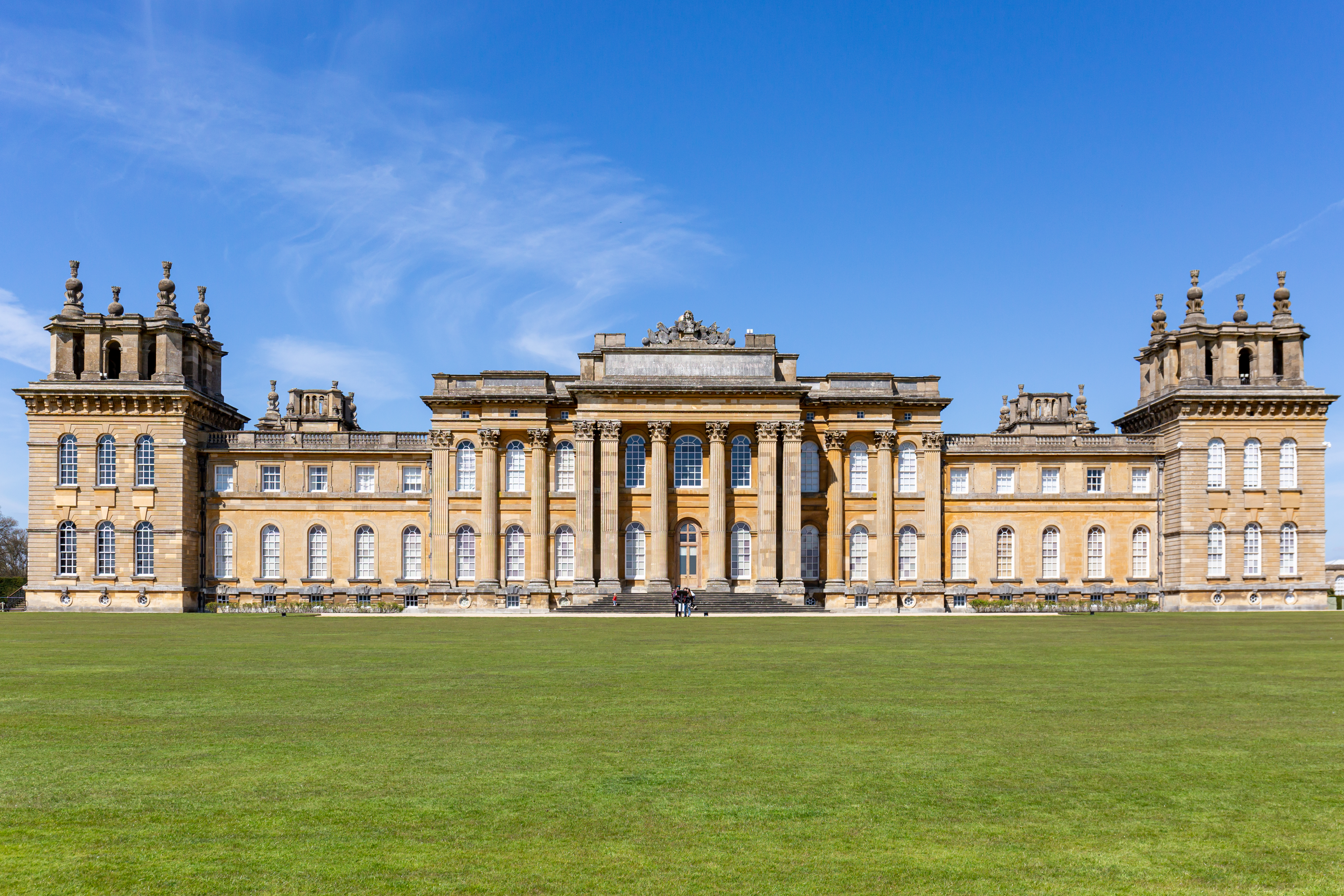
Blenheim Palace in Oxfordshire. One of England's largest houses, it was built between 1705 and 1722.

The country house, however, was not just an oasis of pleasure for its owners; it was also a major centre of employment for local communities. Estate staff often had greater security and accommodation than many agricultural labourers, but their conditions were demanding, with long hours, strict hierarchies, and modest pay.

As a result of the aristocratic habit of only marrying within the aristocracy, and whenever possible to a sole heiress, many owners of country houses owned several country mansions, and would visit each according to the season: Grouse shooting in Scotland, pheasant shooting and fox hunting in England. The Earl of Rosebery, for instance, had Dalmeny House in Scotland, Mentmore Towers in Buckinghamshire, and another house near Epsom just for the racing season. For many, this way of life, which began a steady decline in 1914, continued well into the 20th century, and for a few continues to this day.

=== Minor country houses ===
In the second category of England's country houses are those that belonged to the squirearchy or landed gentry. These tend either to have evolved from medieval hall houses, with rooms added as required, or were purpose-built by relatively unknown local architects. Smaller, and far greater in number than the "power houses", these were still the epicentre of their own estate, but were often the only residence of their owner.

However, whether the owner of a "power house" or a small manor, the inhabitants of the English country house have become collectively referred to as the ruling class, because this is exactly what they did in varying degrees, whether by having high political influence and power in national government, or in the day-to-day running of their own localities or "county" in such offices as lord/deputy lieutenant, magistrates, or occasionally even clergy.

The Country house mystery was a popular genre of English detective fiction in the 1920s and 1930s; set in the residence of the gentry and often involving a murder in a country house temporarily isolated by a snowstorm or similar with the suspects all at a weekend house party.

=== Victorian houses ===
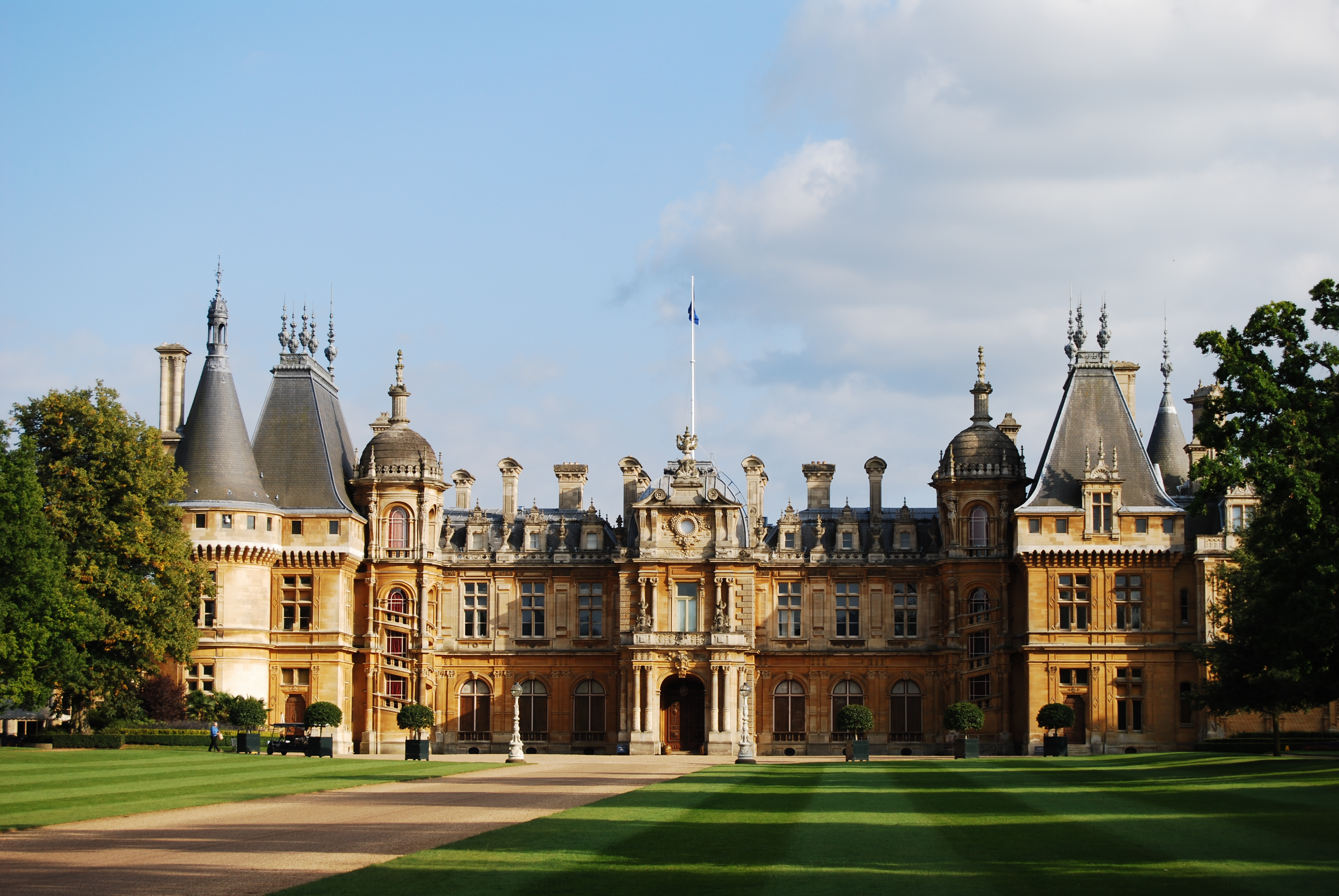
Waddesdon Manor in Buckinghamshire. During the Victorian era, vast country houses were built in a variety of styles by wealthy industrialists and bankers.

Following the Industrial Revolution of the 18th century, a third category of country houses was built as newly rich industrialists and bankers were eager to display their wealth and taste. By the 1850s, with the English economy booming, new mansions were built in one of the many revivalist architectural styles popular throughout the 19th century. The builders of these new houses were able to take advantage of the political unrest in Europe that gave rise to a large trade in architectural salvage. This new wave of country house building is exemplified by the Rothschild properties in the home counties and Bletchley Park (rebuilt in several styles, and famous for its code-breaking role in World War II).

== Decline ==
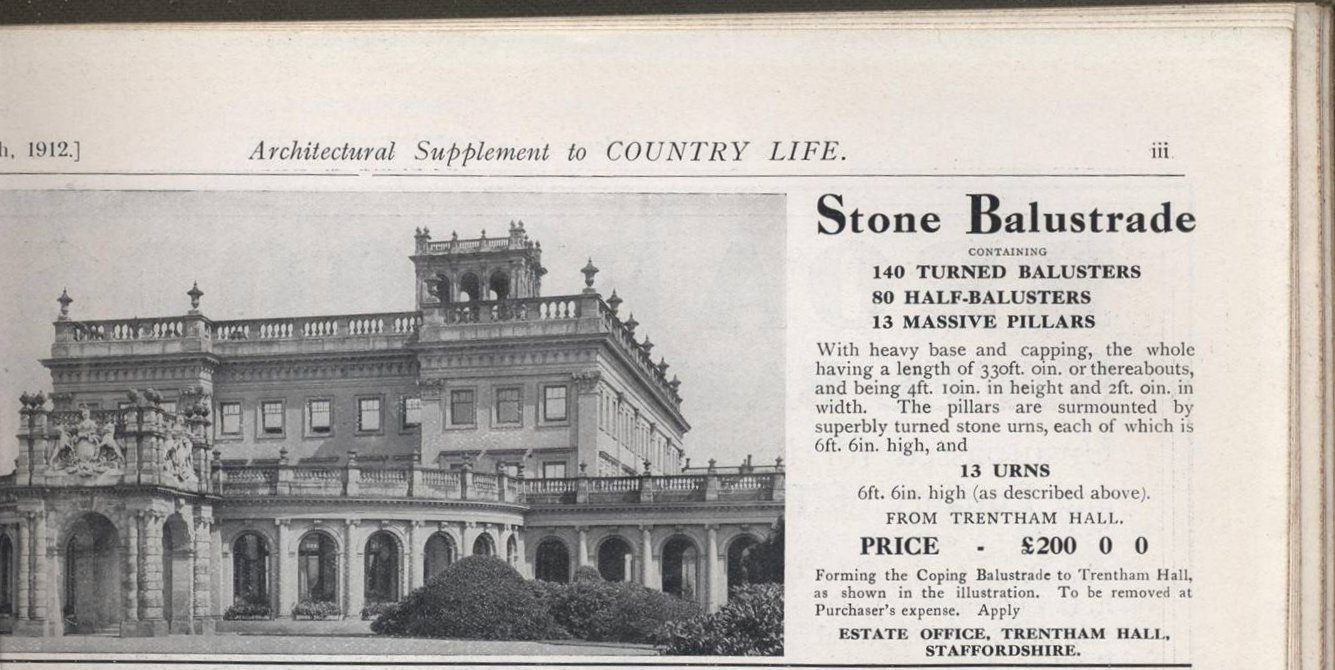
Trentham in Staffordshire. Between 1900 and 1955, around 1,200 English country houses were demolished, often with their stone and fixtures sold. During this era, many fine architectural features were transported to the US.

The slow decline of the English country house coincided with the rise not just of taxation, but also of modern industry, along with the agricultural depression of the 1870s. By 1880, this had led some owners into financial shortfalls as they tried to balance maintenance of their estates with the income they provided. Some relied on funds from secondary sources such as banking and trade while others, like the severely impoverished Duke of Marlborough, sought to marry American heiresses to save their country houses and lifestyles.

The ultimate demise began immediately following World War I. The members of the huge staff required to maintain large houses had either left to fight and never returned, departed to work in the munitions factories, or filled the void left by the fighting men in other workplaces. Of those who returned after the war, many left the countryside for better-paid jobs in towns. The final blow for many country houses came following World War II; having been requisitioned during the war, they were returned to the owners in poor repair. Many estate owners, having lost their heirs, if not in the immediately preceding war then in World War I, were now paying far higher rates of tax, and agricultural incomes had dropped. Thus, the solution for many was to hold contents auctions and then demolish the house and sell its stone, fireplaces, and panelling. This is what happened to many of Britain's finest houses.

Despite this slow decline, so necessary was the country house for entertaining and prestige that in 1917 Viscount Lee of Fareham donated his country house Chequers to the nation if the prime minister lacked one. Chequers, Chevening House and Dorneywood are still used as such, donated for sole use of high-ranking ministers of the Crown.

== Today ==
Today, many country houses have become hotels, schools, hospitals and museums, while others have survived as conserved ruins, but from the early 20th century until the early 1970s, hundreds of country houses were demolished. Houses that survived destruction are now mostly Grade I or II listed as buildings of historic interest with restrictions on restoration and re-creation work. However such work is usually very expensive. Several houses have been restored, some over many years. For example, at Copped Hall where the restoration started in 1995 continues to this day.

Although the ownership or management of some houses has been transferred to a private trust, most notably at Chatsworth, other houses have transferred art works and furnishings under the Acceptance in Lieu scheme to ownership by various national or local museums, but retained for display in the building. This enables the former owners to offset tax, the payment of which would otherwise have necessitated the private sale of the art works. For example, tapestries and furniture at Houghton Hall are now owned by the Victoria and Albert Museum. In addition, increasing numbers of country houses hold licences for weddings and civil ceremonies. Another source of income is to use the house as a venue for parties, a film location or a corporate entertainment venue. While many country houses are open to the public and derive income through that means, they remain homes, in some cases inhabited by the descendants of their original owners.

The lifestyles of those living and working in a country house in the early 20th century were recreated in a BBC television programme, The Edwardian Country House, filmed at Manderston House in Scotland. Another television programme which features life in country houses is the ITV series Downton Abbey.

== See also ==
- Banqueting house
- British country house contents auctions
- Country house poem
- Country house theatre
- English country houses with changed use
- Estate houses in Scotland
- Estate (land)
- Great house
- Historic house
- Homestead (building)
- English landscape garden
- Licence to crenellate
- List of castles in England
- List of country houses in the United Kingdom
- List of English Heritage properties
- List of historic buildings of the United Kingdom – country house architectural periods and styles
- List of National Trust properties in England
- Manor house
- Mansion
- Prodigy house
- Roman villa
- Servants' quarters
- Treasure Houses of England

=== Media ===
- Country Life
- Downton Abbey
- The Edwardian Country House (a Channel 4 series)
- Country House (song)

== Sources and further reading ==
- Airs, Malcolm (1975). The Making of the English Country House, 1500–1640. London: Architectural Press. ISBN 0-85139-378-0.
- Barczewski, Stephanie (2023). How the Country House Became English. London: Reaktion Books. ISBN 9781789147605.
- Coutu, Joan, et al. eds. Politics and the English Country House, 1688–1800 (McGill-Queen's University Press, 2023) online book review
- Girouard, Mark (1978). Life in the English Country House: A Social and Architectural History. New Haven: Yale University Press. ISBN 0-300-02273-5. Details the impact of social change on design.
- Hall, Michael (2009). The Victorian Country House. London: Aurum Press Ltd. ISBN 978-1-84513-457-0.
- Harris, John (1998). No Voice From the Hall: Early Memories of a Country House Snooper. London: John Murray. ISBN 0-7195-5567-1.
- Jackson-Stops, Gervase & James Pipkin, The English Country House: A Grand Tour, Weidenfeld & Nicolson, 1985 ISBN 978-0-297-78680-1
- Kroll, Alexander, ed. (1969). Historic Houses: Conversations in Stately Homes. Discussions with Robert Harling. London: Condé Nast. ISBN 0-900303-05-0.
- Lewis, Lesley (1997). The Private Life of a Country House. Stroud: Sutton. ISBN 0-7509-1678-8. Gives much detail of how a smaller country house operated in the early 20th century.
- Lycett Green, Candida (1991). The Perfect English Country House. London: Pavilion Books ltd. ISBN 1-85145-551-5.
- McKinstry, Leo (2005). Rosebery: A Statesman in Turmoil. London: John Murray. ISBN 0-7195-6586-3.
- Murdoch, Tessa (2006). Noble Households: Eighteenth-Century Inventories of Great English Houses. A Tribute to John Cornforth. Cambridge: John Adamson. ISBN 978-0-9524322-5-8.
- Robinson, John Martin, The English Country Estate, Century Hutchinson/National Trust, 1988 ISBN 0-71-262275-6
- Sayer, Michael; Hugh Massingberd ed. The Disintegration of a Heritage: Country Houses and their Collections, 1979-1992, Michael Russell, 1993 ISBN 978-0-859-55197-7
- Stuart, Amanda Mackenzie (2005). Consuelo and Alva Vanderbilt: The Story of a Daughter and Mother in the Gilded Age. New York: Harper Perennial. ISBN 978-0-06-093825-3.
- Tinniswood, Adrian, The Polite Tourist: A History of Country House Visiting, The National Trust, 1998 ISBN 978-0-707-80224-4
- Worsley, Giles (2002). England's Lost Houses. London: Aurum Press. ISBN 1-85410-820-4.
