= Craig-y-Nos Castle =

Castle in the Swansea Valley, Powys, Wales

Craig-y-nos Castle
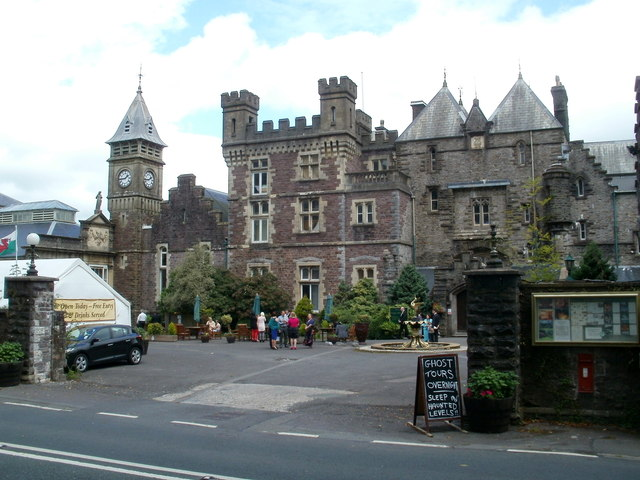
- Craig-y-nos Castle in 2011

- Location within Powys

General information
- Location: Swansea Valley, Powys, Wales
- Coordinates: 51°49′30.00″N 3°41′03.00″W

Website
- www.craigynoscastle.com

Craig-y-nos Castle (meaning: Rock of the Night), is a Scots baronial-style country house near Glyntawe in Powys, Wales. Built on parkland beside the River Tawe in the upper Swansea Valley, it is located on the southeastern edge of the Black Mountain. The castle, formerly owned by opera singer Adelina Patti, is now a hotel. Its landscaped grounds are now a country park, managed by the Brecon Beacons National Park Authority. They are listed on the Cadw/ICOMOS Register of Parks and Gardens of Special Historic Interest in Wales. The castle is a Grade II* listed building and its theatre has a separate Grade I listing.

== History ==
=== Early history ===
==== Powell family ====
The main building was built between 1841 and 1843 by Captain Rhys Davies Powell, to designs by Thomas Henry Wyatt. His younger son, his wife and younger daughter all predeceased him. Powell's death in 1862 was followed by that of his eldest son in 1864 and his surviving daughter Sarah inherited the estate. After the death of her husband in 1875, the estate was sold.

==== Morgan Morgan ====
After the estate entered into the trust of the Chancery, it was bought by Morgan Morgan of Abercrave for £6,000 in 1876. Captain Morgan and his family, plus his son also called Morgan Morgan and his family, lived jointly in the castle for several years. The family cleared a large plantation of 80-year-old fir trees which stood between the castle and the quarries above, which were said to be home to a local population of red squirrels.

=== Adelina Patti ===
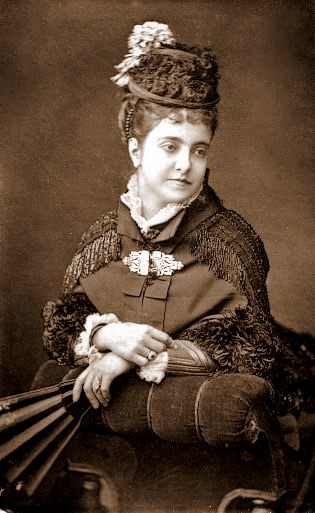
Adelina Patti

Adelina Patti purchased the castle and surrounding park land for £3500 in 1878 to develop it as her own private estate. Having achieved great success as a singer, Patti spent the rest of her life at Craig-y-nos, leaving it only to sing in the premier opera houses of Europe and to tour the United States.

After her second marriage, to French tenor Ernesto Nicolini, she embarked on a major building programme at the castle, adding the North and South wings, the clock tower, conservatory, winter garden and theatre. After making her last public appearance in October 1914, when she sang for the Red Cross and filled the Albert Hall, she spent the rest of her life at Craig-y-nos with her third husband. The castle is a Grade II* listed building.

==== Adelina Patti Theatre ====
The Adelina Patti Theatre is a Grade I listed opera house. Built to be Patti's own private auditorium, it was designed by Swansea architects Bucknall and Jennings, with input from Sir Henry Irving. Briefed by Patti to be her miniature version of La Scala, Milan, it incorporates features from Wagner's Bayreuth Festspielhaus opera house in Bayreuth, and the Theatre Royal, Drury Lane, London.

At 40 feet (12 m) long, 26 feet (7.9 m) wide and 24 feet (7.3 m) high the auditorium was originally decorated in pale blue, cream and gold wall panels. Ten Corinthian columns support the ceiling, and in between these are the names of composers such as Mozart, Verdi and Rossini, all gilded and surmounted by Madam Patti's monogram. The stage area was originally fronted by blue silk curtains, with a back drop that illustrates Madam Patti riding in a chariot, dressed as Semiramide from the opera of the same name by Rossini. The design incorporates a mechanical auditorium floor which can be: raised level, for use as a ballroom; or sloped towards the stage, when in use as a theatre. The theatre incorporated an organ, given to Patti in the United States after one of her tours. This was dismantled in the 1920s when the buildings became a hospital.

Able to seat 150 people, the back of the theatre houses a gallery where the domestic staff would sit, enabling them to enjoy the performances. The orchestra pit is separated from the seating area by a balustrade, and holds up to 24 musicians.

Invitations for the July 12, 1891, opening event went to two types of guest: those invited to stay at the castle, and those invited just for the performance. House guests included: the Spanish Ambassador; Baron and Baroness Julius De Reuter, founder of the Reuters news agency; and Lord and Lady Swansea. Journalists from international newspapers including The Daily Telegraph, Le Figaro and the Boston Herald were also invited as house guests to report on the opening. Final rehearsals occurred in the afternoon with the Swansea Opera Company, before a specially chartered train arrived at Penwyllt with the performance guests. Due to start at 20:00, the performance eventually started at 20:30 after a light tea. Sir Henry Irving was to have given the opening address, but as he was unable to attend, leading actor William Terris deputised. Patti's performance included the prelude to act one of La traviata, and in the second half the Garden Scene from Faust. There then followed a buffet supper served in the conservatory, with a total of 450 bottles of champagne consumed at the party.

Today the theatre remains a time capsule, and the stage is probably the only surviving example of original 19th century backstage equipment. The opera house is licensed for weddings.

==== Winter garden ====
The Patti Pavilion, Swansea after refurbishment, 2009

The winter garden is made mainly from glass.

A pair of wrought iron water fountains in the shape of cranes were made in the local ironworks by a Mr Crane, who made decorative ironware.

As a result of World War I, in 1918, Patti presented her winter garden to the people of Swansea where it became the Patti Pavilion, and has since been restored on several occasions. One of the crane fountains stands in the forecourt of the castle, the other in the grounds of Swansea University.

==== Electricity ====
Craig-y-nos was probably the first private house in Wales to be wired for electricity. The first in the UK was Cragside in Northumberland in 1880, a year after the invention of the electric light bulb by Thomas Edison. An Otto engine in the grounds created a 110 V DC system, with distribution provided by two bare copper wires placed in two adjacent grooves carved into a plank of wood, with a second plank placed over the top of it. This supplied power for Swan lamps throughout the castle, and an electrically powered Welte Concert Orchestrion, which was situated in the French billiards room and operated by a perforated paper roll. The organ was the pride and joy of Patti's second husband, French tenor Nicolini, thus dating installation prior to his death in 1898. The rediscovery and investigation of this system is credited to Mr J. A. Lea, the last Hospital Secretary.

==== Transport ====
The Neath and Brecon Railway Craig-y-nos railway station was in part funded by Patti. A private road was constructed from the castle to the station, where a lavishly furnished private waiting room was installed. In return the Neath and Brecon Railway was commissioned to provide Patti with her own private railway carriage, which she could request attached to any train to take her whenever, and wherever within the United Kingdom, she wanted to travel.

At the start of the 20th century, Patti had one of the first motor cars in Wales, and is reported to have raced a local doctor from Swansea to Abercrave for a small wager.

=== Tuberculosis hospital ===
After Adelina Patti's death in 1919, the castle and the grounds were sold to the Welsh National Memorial Trust for £11,000 in March 1921, an organisation founded to combat tuberculosis in Wales. Reconstructed as a sanatorium and called the Adelina Patti Hospital at the request of her widower, it admitted its first patients in August 1922. In 1947, the children of Craig-y-nos were among the first in the UK to receive the first effective TB medicine, the antibiotic streptomycin. In 1959, it became a hospital for the elderly. After the transfer of remaining patients to the new Ystradgynlais Community Hospital, the castle closed as a hospital on 31 March 1986.

More information about Craig-y-nos' time as a TB hospital may be found in the book 'The Children of Craig-y-nos' by Ann Shaw and Carole Reeves. Clive Rowlands, a famous rugby player, was one of its patients, being admitted in 1947, as an eight-year-old. He was given a rugby ball as a gift and accidentally kicked it through a glass door, for which he was put in a straitjacket for a week.

In a project supported by the Heritage Lottery Fund, the Sleeping Giant Foundation charity, the Wellcome Trust Centre and University College of London, in 2007 an exhibition at the Welfare Hall, Ystradgynlais, showed relics and recorded recollections of patients from its time as a TB sanatorium.

=== Recent history ===
The Welsh Office declared Craig-y-nos Castle and its unique theatre surplus to requirements soon after the opening of the new Community Hospital in nearby Ystradgynlais. In 1988 the freehold of the property was sold to a consortium of businessmen who formed the Craig-y-nos Castle Company Ltd. After a long period of repair and restoration, the castle opened to the public as a functions venue but was badly hit by the economic recession of the early 1990s. Craig-y-nos Castle was then sold to John and Penelope Jones who continued the essential repair work including the complete renewal of the theatre's courtyard doors, installation of new central-heating system, re-roofing the theatre, while organising national antiques fairs, musical events and wedding receptions. In October 2000 they sold Craig-y-nos to SelClene Ltd. which continued the restoration, and opened the castle as a hotel.

The castle gardens are listed Grade II* on the Cadw/ICOMOS Register of Parks and Gardens of Special Historic Interest in Wales.

In 2005, the castle featured in the BBC Doctor Who episode Tooth and Claw, featuring David Tennant as the Doctor and Billie Piper as Rose Tyler. The Torchwood crew later stayed at this hotel and filmed some scenes when filming Countrycide.

Craig Y Nos Castle is currently used a wedding venue, with guest accommodation and additionally provides ghost tours, along with dog friendly accommodation.

== Sources ==
- Scourfield, Robert; Haslam, Robert (2013). Powys. Buildings of Wales. New Haven, US and London: Yale University Press. ISBN 978-0-300-18508-9.
