= Runshaw Hall =

Country house in Lancashire, England

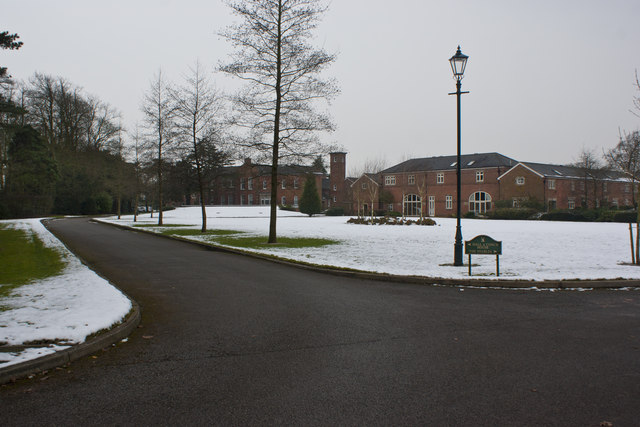
- Runshaw Hall

- Location within the Borough of Chorley

General information
- Architectural style: Italianate
- Location: Euxton, Lancashire, England
- Coordinates: 53.6759°N 2.6970°W
- Opened: 1862

Technical details
- Material: Red brick with yellow stone dressings

Listed Building – Grade II
- Designated: 21 February 1984
- Reference no.: 1362141

Runshaw Hall is a grade II listed 19th-century country house in Runshaw Hall Lane, Euxton, Chorley, Lancashire, England, which has been converted into apartments. It is surrounded by parkland containing a pond and woodland.

The hall is an italianate rectangular two-storey building built of red brick with yellow stone dressing and a hipped slate roof. There are 6 bays along the longer side and 3 along the shorter.

In earlier times a previous property belonged successively to the Lancasters of Rainhill and the Farnworth family, who vacated the hall c.1747 on the death of Edward Farnworth. The current house was built in 1862 and was acquired by William Bretherton. On his death in 1890 it passed to his second son Norris Bretherton (1860–1924). Before and after the Second World War it was a run by the Brothers of Charity as a Residential Home for mentally challenged young men, after which it served as a restaurant in the 1970s. After a fire it was converted to an apartment complex.
