= Ernesto Nicolini =

French operatic tenor

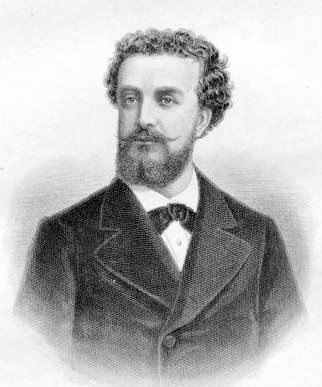
Ernesto Nicolini

Ernesto Nicolini (23 February 1834 – 18 January 1898) was a French operatic dramatic tenor, particularly associated with the French and Italian repertories.

Born Ernest Nicolas in Tours, France, he studied at the Paris Conservatory and made his debut in 1857, at the Opéra-Comique in Halevy's Les mousquetaires de la reine. After further study in Italy, he made his debut at La Scala in Milan in 1859, under the name Ernesto Nicolini, as Alfredo in La traviata, other roles there included Rodrigo in Rossini's Otello, and Elvino in Bellini's La sonnambula.

On his return to France, he sang at the Théâtre-Italien from 1862 until 1869. He made his debut at the Royal Opera House, Covent Garden, in London in 1866, as Edgardo in Lucia di Lammermoor, without great success due to the pronounced vibrato that marred his singing.

Five years later he returned to London to sing in Faust and Robert le diable at Drury Lane, and from 1872 appeared every season at the Royal Opera House until 1884; his roles there included Pery in Il Guarany, Radames in Aida, and the title role in Lohengrin. He created the role of Celio at the premiere of Charles Lenepveu's Velléda in 1882.

During the season 1874–75, he appeared in St Petersburg and Moscow, opposite the world-famous soprano Adelina Patti, whom he would partner in almost all her appearances thereafter, accompanying her on concert tours of the major western European capitals (Vienna, Milan, Venice, Brussels, Berlin and so on), as well on tours of the United States and South America.

While together in Paris in 1886, singing in Faust at the Grand Opéra, the two created something of a scandal by getting married; Patti had divorced her first husband, the Marquis de Caux, shortly before her wedding to Nicolini.

Nicolini appeared on stage for the last time at Drury Lane in 1897, as Almaviva in Il barbiere di Siviglia.

Nicolini died of cancer in Pau, France, on January 18, 1898.

== Sources ==
- Grove Music Online, Elizabeth Forbes, July 2008.
