= Adelina Patti =

Italian opera singer (1843–1919)

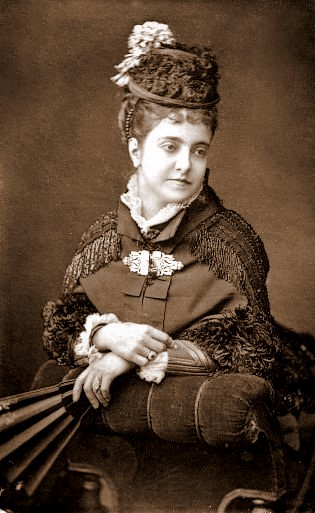
- Born: Adela Juana Maria Patti; 19 February 1843; Madrid, Spain
- Died: 27 September 1919 (aged 76); Craig-y-Nos Castle, Wales
- Occupation: soprano
- Label: Gramophone and Typewriter Company
- Spouses: Henri de Roger de Cahusac; Ernesto Nicolini; Rolf Cederström
- Relatives: Carlotta Patti (sister); Effie Germon (sister-in-law); Patti LuPone (great-great niece); Robert LuPone (great-great nephew)

Signature
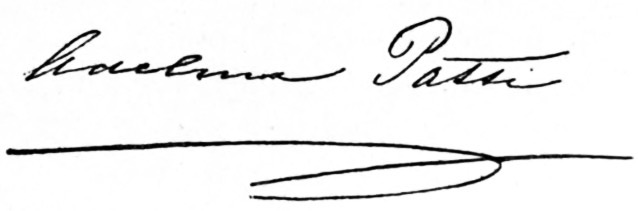

Adela Juana Maria Patti (19 February 1843 – 27 September 1919), commonly known as Adelina Patti, was an Italian opera singer. At the height of her career, she was earning huge fees performing in the music capitals of Europe and America. She first sang in public as a child in 1851, and gave her last performance before an audience in 1914. Along with her near contemporaries Jenny Lind and Christina Nilsson, Patti remains one of the most famous sopranos in history, owing to the purity and beauty of her lyrical voice and the unmatched quality of her bel canto technique.

The composer Giuseppe Verdi, writing in 1877, described her as being perhaps the finest singer who had ever lived and a "stupendous artist". Verdi's admiration for Patti's talent was shared by numerous music critics and social commentators of her era.

== Biography ==
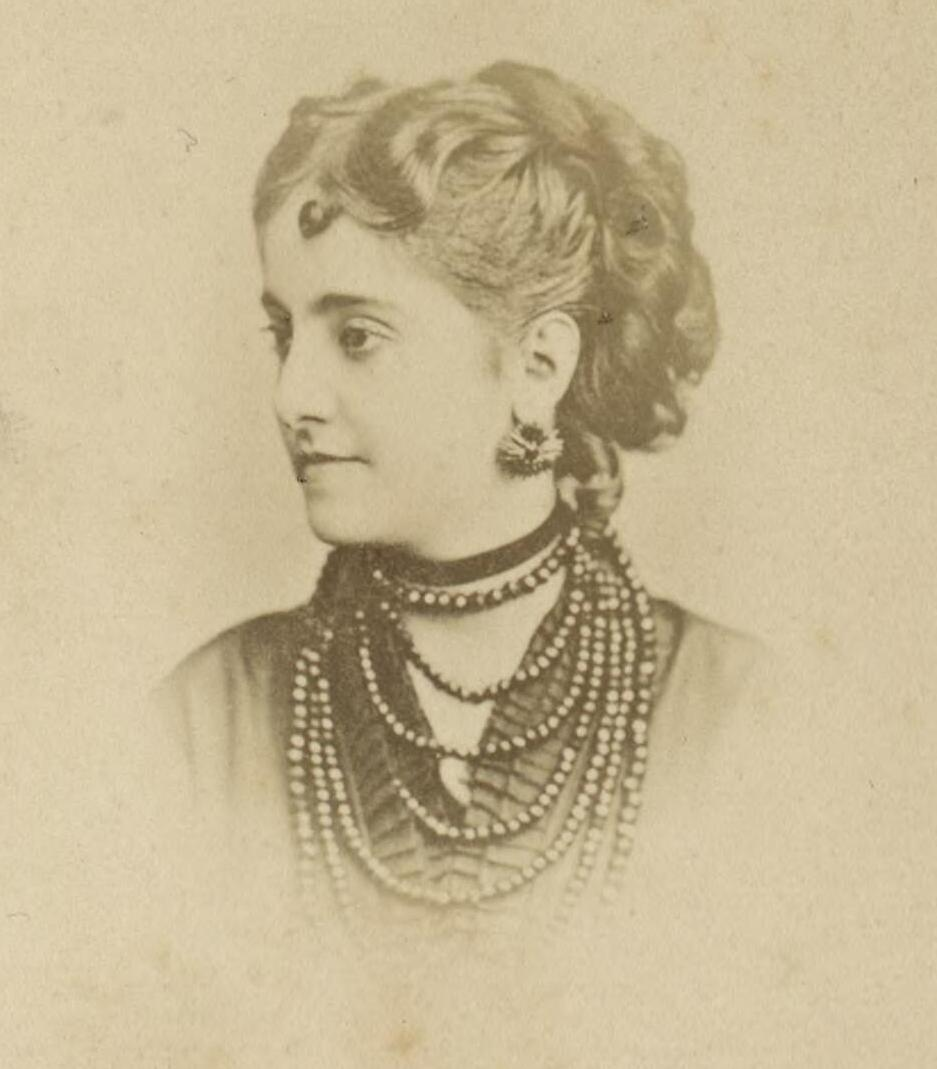
Portrait of Adelina Patti, 1860s

She was born Adela Juana Maria Patti, in Madrid, the youngest child of tenor Salvatore Patti (1800–1869) and soprano Caterina Barilli (died 1870). Her Italian parents were working in Spain, at the time of her birth. Because her father came from Sicily, Patti was born a subject of the King of the Two Sicilies. She later carried a French passport, as her first two husbands were French.

Her sisters Amalia and Carlotta Patti were also singers. Her brother Carlo Patti was a violinist who married actress Effie Germon. In her childhood, the family moved to New York City. Patti grew up in the Wakefield section of the Bronx, where her family's home remains standing. Patti sang professionally from childhood, and developed into a coloratura soprano with perfectly equalized vocal registers and a surprisingly warm, satiny tone. Patti learned how to sing and gained understanding of voice technique from her brother-in-law Maurice Strakosch, who was a musician and impresario.

=== Vocal development ===
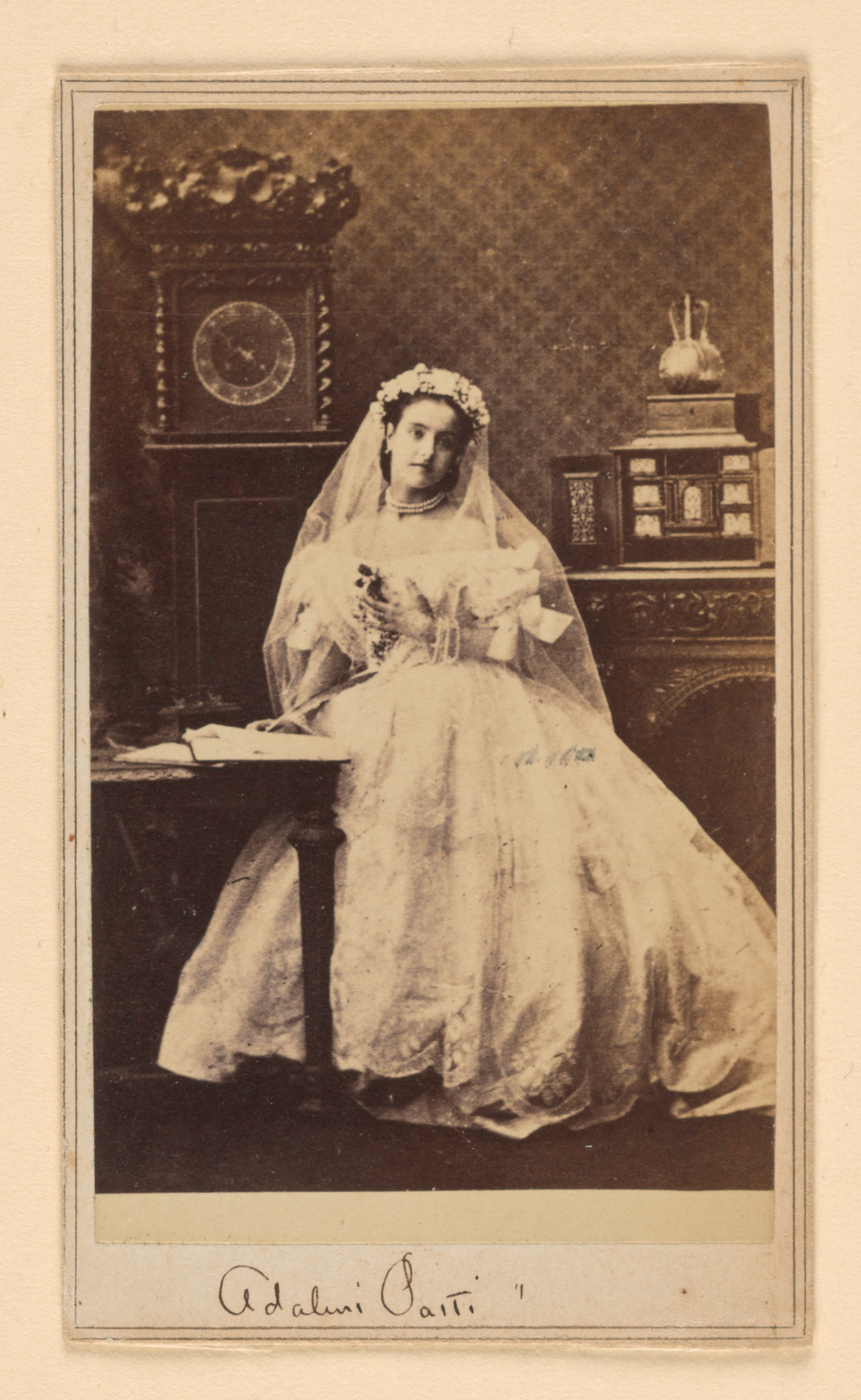
Adelina Patti (National Portrait Gallery)

Adelina Patti made her operatic debut at age 16 on 24 November 1859 in the title role of Donizetti's Lucia di Lammermoor at the Academy of Music, New York. On 24 August 1860, she and Emma Albani were soloists in the world premiere of Charles Wugk Sabatier's Cantata in Montreal which was performed in honour of the visit of the Prince of Wales. In 1861, at the age of 18, she was invited to Covent Garden, to perform the role of Amina in Bellini's La sonnambula. She had such remarkable success at Covent Garden that season, she bought a house in Clapham and, using London as a base, went on to conquer the European continent, performing Amina in Paris and Vienna in subsequent years with equal success.

During an 1862 American tour, she sang John Howard Payne's song "Home! Sweet Home!" at the White House for President Abraham Lincoln and wife, Mary Todd Lincoln. The Lincolns were mourning the death of their son Willie, who had died of typhoid. Moved to tears, the Lincolns requested an encore of the song. Henceforth, it would become associated with Adelina Patti, and she performed it many times as a bonus item at the end of recitals and concerts.

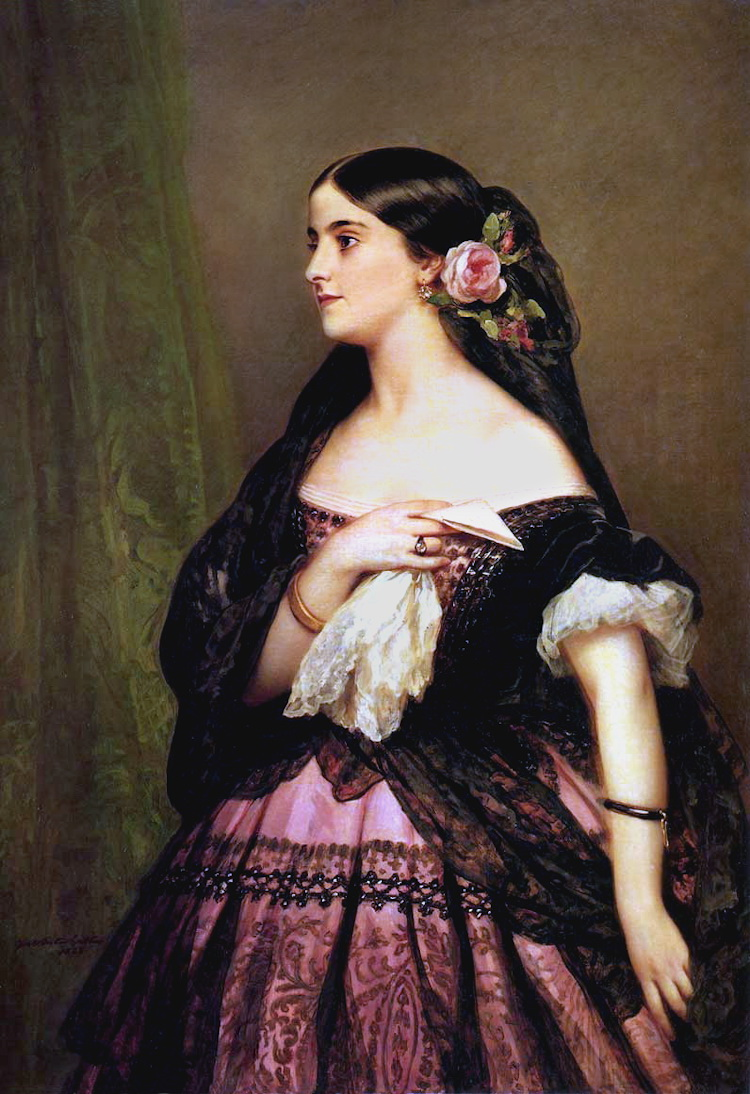
Portrait by Franz Winterhalter (1862)

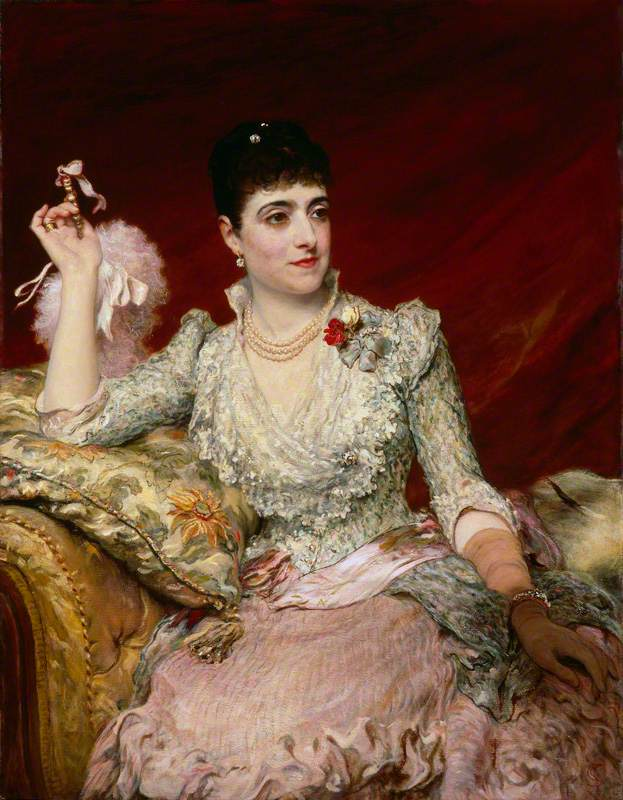
Portrait by James Sant (1886)

Patti’s career was marked by sustained professional success. She performed extensively in England and the United States, as well as in mainland Europe, including Russia, and in South America. Her appearances were widely attended and received significant attention from audiences and critics. In addition to her vocal abilities, her youthful appearance contributed to her stage presence and public reputation.

In 1869-1870 she engaged in tours through the Europe and Russia. Concerts in Moscow and Saint Petersburg were very successful and Patti repeated her Russian trips throughout the 1870s. In Russia, she made highly prolific friendships with the top echelons of Russian aristocracy, musicians, writers and intellectuals such Pyotr Ilyich Tchaikovsky, Anton Rubinstein, Alexander Serov and Vladimir Stasov. In St. Petersburg, during seasons 1874-75s, Patti met Ernesto Nicolini (in future her second husband) for the first time. At that time she also became acquainted with prominent Russian historian Dmitry Ilovaysky and with his family. This friendship was to last for decades and Ilovaysky's cousin Stepan, the stalmeister of Tsar Alexander III even travelled to Wales to meet Adelina during the first half of the 1880s. Patti was also a teacher of Ilovaysky's daughter Varvara.

During the 1860s, Patti possessed a sweet, high-flying voice of birdlike purity and remarkable flexibility which was ideal for such parts as Zerlina, Lucia and Amina; but, as Verdi noted in 1878, her lower notes gained fullness and beauty when she grew older, enabling her to excel in weightier fare. Patti, however, turned into a conservative singer in the final phase of her operatic and concert career. She knew what suited her aging voice to perfection and she stuck to it. Typically, her recital programmes during the 1890s featured an array of familiar, often sentimental, not-too-demanding popular tunes of the day, which were sure to appeal to her adoring fans.

But during her mature prime in the 1870s and '80s, Patti had been a more enterprising singer, proving to be an effective actress in those lyric roles that required the summoning forth of deep emotions, such as Gilda in Rigoletto, Leonora in Il trovatore, the title part in Semiramide, Zerlina in Don Giovanni and Violetta in La traviata. She also had been prepared to tackle quite dramatic parts in operas like L'Africaine, Les Huguenots and even Aida. She never attempted to sing any verismo parts, however, because these became popular only in the twilight of her career, during the final decade of the 19th century.

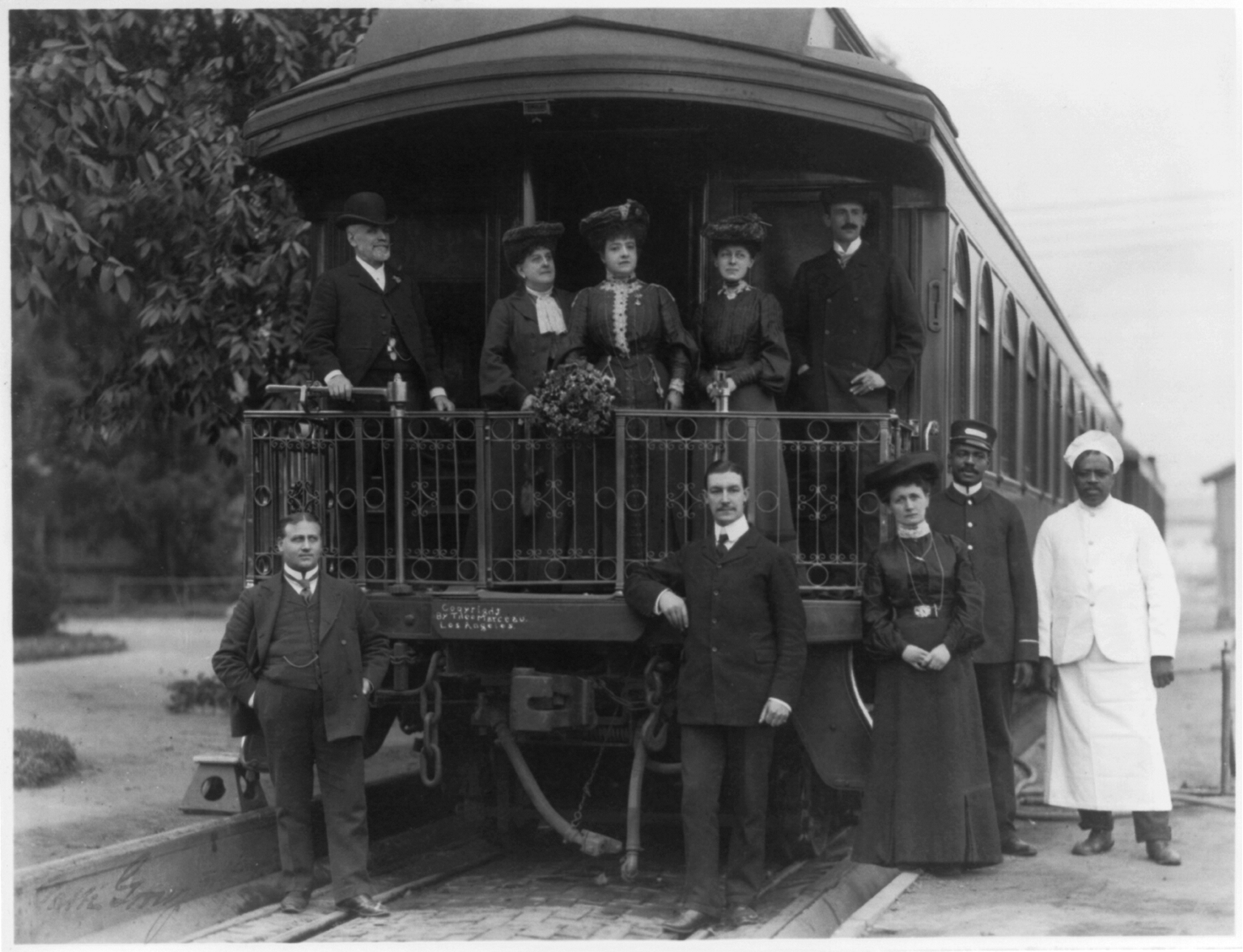
Patti, her entourage, and Pullman attendants ca. 1904

Many years earlier, Patti had experienced an amusing encounter in Paris with the bel canto-opera composer Gioachino Rossini, who was a staunch upholder of traditional Italian singing values. It is related that when Patti's mentor (and brother-in-law), Strakosch, presented her to Rossini at one of his fashionable receptions during the 1860s, she was prevailed upon to sing "Una voce poco fa", from Rossini's The Barber of Seville—with embellishments added by Strakosch to show off the soprano's voice. "What composition was that?", asked the prickly Rossini. "Why, maestro, your own" replied Strakosch. "Oh no, that is not my composition, that is Strakoschonnerie", Rossini retorted. ('Cochonnerie' is a strong French idiom indicating "garbage" and literally meaning "that which is characteristic of or fit for pigs.")

=== Financial acumen and retirement ===
In her prime, Patti commanded a payment of $5,000 per night, in gold. Her contracts stipulated that her name be top-billed and printed larger than any other name in the cast.

In his memoirs, the famous opera promoter "Colonel" Mapleson recalled Patti's stubborn personality and sharp business sense. She reportedly had a parrot whom she had trained to shriek, "CASH! CASH!" whenever Mapleson walked in the room. Jerome K. Jerome wrote in 1926:

We had good opera at Covent Garden and sometimes at Her Majesty's in the Haymarket also. It was the extravagant fees paid to the stars that killed it. I was with a firm of solicitors who acted for Mapleson. Adelina Patti and the others would insist upon sums that were bound to spell loss to the management even when the house was sold out. The argument was that she drew more than she asked. There was no sense in it. Without the orchestra and the chorus and the other performers, the house and all the rest of it, how much would she have drawn night after night?

Patti enjoyed the trappings of fame and wealth, but she was not profligate with her earnings, especially after losing a large proportion of her assets as a result of the break-up of her first marriage (see below). She invested wisely large sums of money, and unlike some of her extravagant former colleagues, such as the star tenor Giovanni Mario, who died in poverty, she saw out her days amid luxurious surroundings.

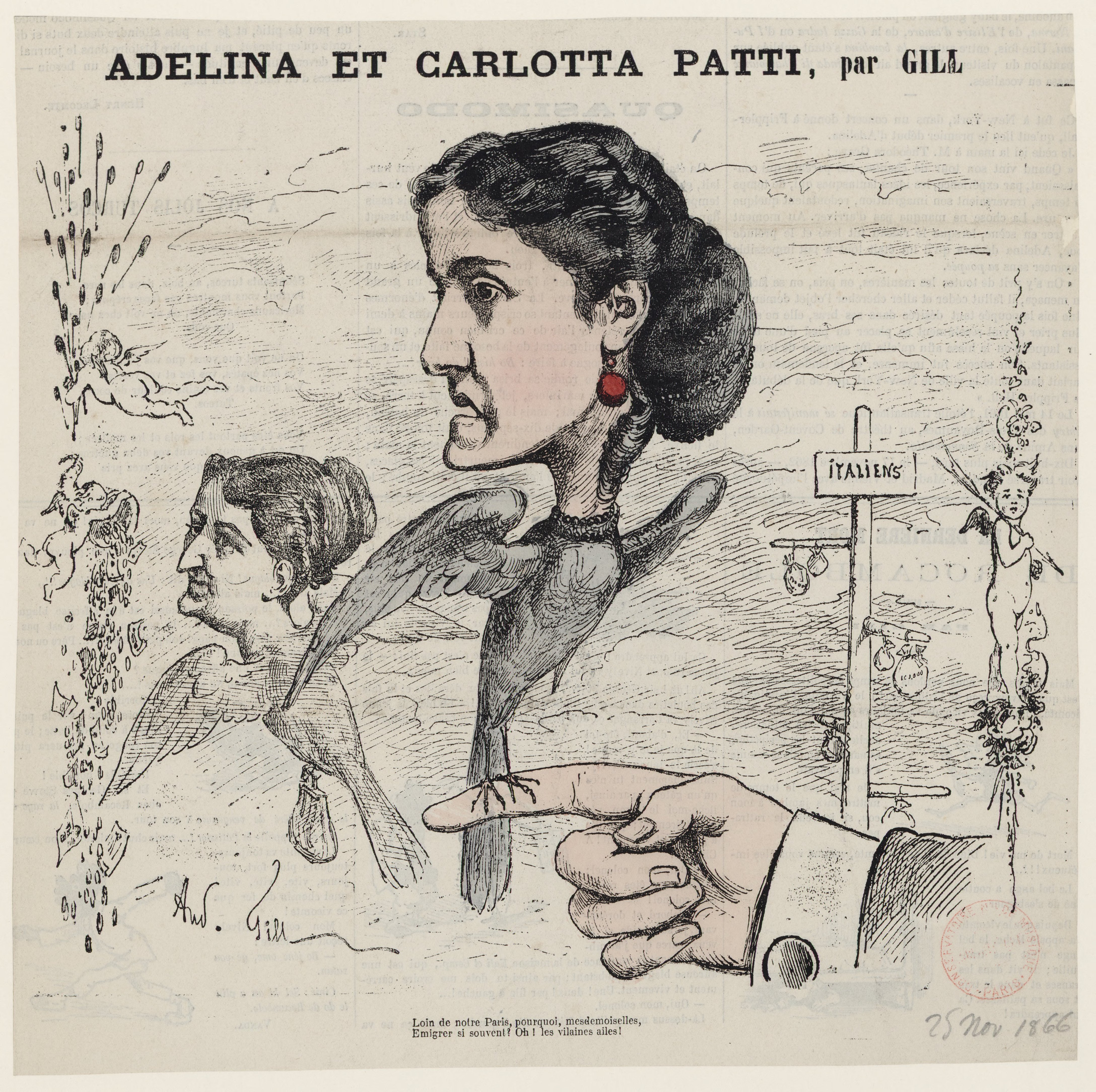
Patti caricatured by the French artist André Gill

In 1893, Patti created the title role of Gabriella in a now-forgotten opera by Emilio Pizzi at its world premiere in Boston. Patti had commissioned Pizzi to write the opera for her.

Ten years later, she undertook one final singing tour of the United States; however, it turned out to be a critical, financial and personal failure, owing to the deterioration of her voice through age and wear-and-tear. From then on she restricted herself to the occasional concert here or there, or to private performances mounted at a little theatre she had built in her impressive residence, Craig-y-Nos Castle in Wales. She last sang in public on 24 October 1914, taking part in a Red Cross concert at London's Royal Albert Hall that had been organised to aid victims of World War I. She lived long enough to see the war end, dying in 1919 of natural causes.

== Recordings ==
Il bacio
(composer Luigi Arditi) by Adelina Patti in 1906

The first recordings of her voice were made ca. 1890 on phonograph cylinders for Thomas Marshall in New York. Neither the recorded titles, nor their numbers are known. All but one of these cylinders have been lost. The sole surviving cylinder remains at Syracuse University in New York. Due to its fragility it is unable to be played without the risk of damage.

Patti cut more than 30 disc gramophone recordings of songs and operatic arias (some of them duplicates) — plus one spoken voice recording (a New Year's greeting to her third husband, which she intended him to keep as a memento) — at her Welsh home in 1905 and 1906 for the Gramophone & Typewriter Company. By then she was aged in her 60s, with her voice well past its prime after a busy operatic career stretching all the way back to 1859.

Composer: Vincenzo Bellini (1801-1835) Libretto: Felice Romani (1788-1865) Singer: Adelina Patti (1843-1919)

Nonetheless, her tone and legato line remained strong, compensating for her overall breath control. The records also display chest voice, mellow timbre, and trill.

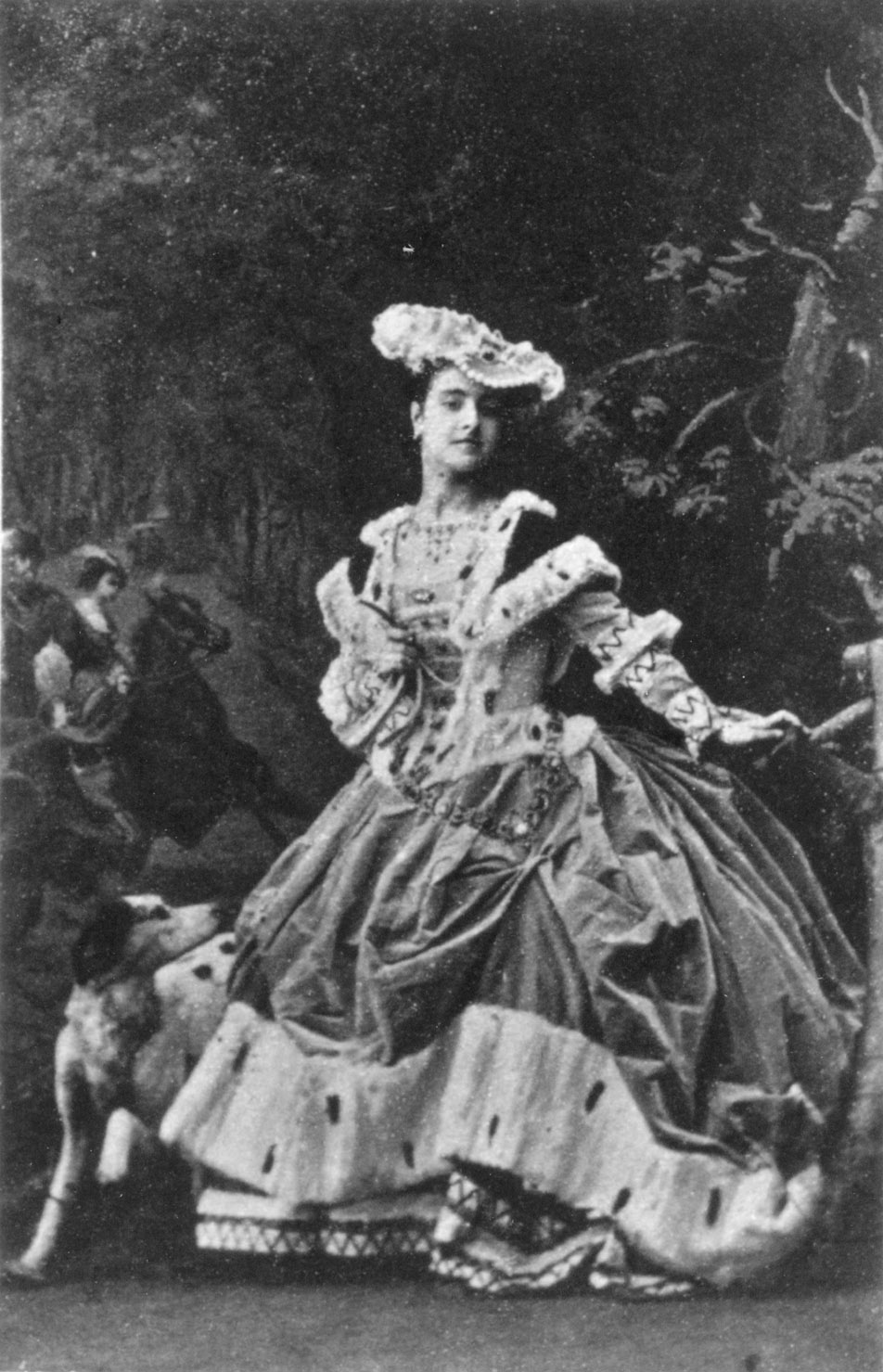
Adelina Patti as Lady Harriet in 'Martha' by Flotow, Camille Silvy

Patti's recorded legacy included a number of songs and arias from the following operas: Le Nozze di Figaro, Don Giovanni, Faust, Martha, Norma, Mignon and La sonnambula.

The records were produced by the Gramophone & Typewriter Company, forerunner of EMI Records, and were issued in the United States by the Victor Talking Machine Company. Patti's piano accompanist, Landon Ronald, wrote of his first recording session with the diva, "When the little (gramophone) trumpet gave forth the beautiful tones, she went into ecstasies! She threw kisses into the trumpet and kept on saying, 'Ah! Mon Dieu! Maintenant je comprends pourquoi je suis Patti! Oh oui! Quelle voix! Quelle artiste! Je comprends tout!' [Ah! My Lord! Now I understand why I am Patti! Oh yes! What a voice! What an artist! I understand everything!] Her enthusiasm was so naïve and genuine that the fact that she was praising her own voice seemed to us all to be right and proper."

Thirty-two Patti recordings were reissued on CD in 1998 by Marston Records (catalogue number 52011-2).

== Personal life ==
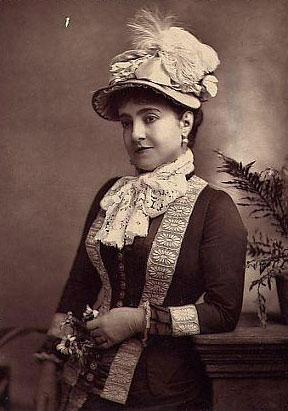
Adelina Patti

Engaged as a minor to Henri de Lossy, Baron of Ville, Patti wed three times: first, in 1868, to Henri de Roger de Cahusac, Marquess of Caux (1826–1889). The marriage soon collapsed; both had affairs and de Caux was granted a legal separation in 1877 and divorced in 1885. The union was dissolved with bitterness and cost her half her fortune.

She then lived with the French tenor Ernesto Nicolini for many years until, following her divorce from Caux, she was able to marry him in 1886. That marriage lasted until his death and was seemingly happy, but Nicolini disinherited Patti, suggesting some tension in the last years.

Patti's last marriage, in 1899, was to Baron Rolf Cederström (1870–1947), a priggish, but handsome, Swedish aristocrat many years her junior. The Baron severely curtailed Patti's social life. He cut down her domestic staff from 40 to 18, but gave her the devotion and flattery that she needed, becoming her sole legatee. After her death, he married a much younger woman. Their only daughter, Brita Yvonne Cederström (born 1924), ended up as Patti's sole heir. Patti had no children, but was close to her nieces and nephews. The three-time Tony Award-winning Broadway actress and singer Patti LuPone is a great-grandniece and namesake. Drummer Scott Devours is her third great nephew.

Patti developed a love for billiards and became a reputable player, making guest appearances at many major billiard events for exhibition matches and fancy shot displays.

In her retirement, Patti, now officially Baroness Cederström, settled in the Swansea Valley in Wales, where she purchased Craig-y-Nos Castle. There she had a $2000 billiard table installed, and her own private theatre, a miniature version of the one at Bayreuth, and made her gramophone recordings.

Patti also funded Craig-y-nos railway station on the Neath and Brecon Railway. In 1918, she presented the Winter Garden building from her Craig-y-Nos estate to the city of Swansea. It was re-erected and renamed the Patti Pavilion. She died at Craig-y-Nos and eight months later was buried at the Père Lachaise Cemetery in Paris to be close to her father and favourite composer, Rossini, in accordance with the wishes in her will.

== Voice ==
Adelina Patti had a high soprano voice. Her vocal emission was of perfect equality and her vocal range was wide, from low C to high F (C_{4} – F_{6}).

== Accolades and homages ==
La Vie parisienne by Jacques Offenbach, with book by Henri Meilhac and Ludovic Halévy (1866), mentions Adelina Patti:

"Je veux, moi, dans la capitale
Voir les divas qui font fureur
Voir la Patti dans Don Pasquale
Et Thérésa dans le Sapeur"

Other works of literature and music evoking Patti include:

- Anna Karenina by Leo Tolstoy
- The Picture of Dorian Gray by Oscar Wilde
- The Age of Innocence by Edith Wharton
- Nana by Émile Zola
- Boroña by Leopoldo Alas
- Sherlock Holmes by Arthur Conan Doyle
- The Village in the Treetops by Jules Verne
- Hitty, Her First Hundred Years by Rachel Field
- The song "The Deadwood Stage (Whip-Crack-Away!)" featured in both Calamity Jane film and Calamity Jane stage musical mentions a hat that Patti wore as part of the contents for sale in the stagecoach's offerings.
- In the 1890s, African-American singer Sissieretta Jones adopted the stage name "Black Patti," and called her company "Black Patti's Troubadours."
- The Ballad of Baby Doe by Douglas Moore
