= William Morris textile designs =

Textile designs by a founder of the British Arts and Crafts movement

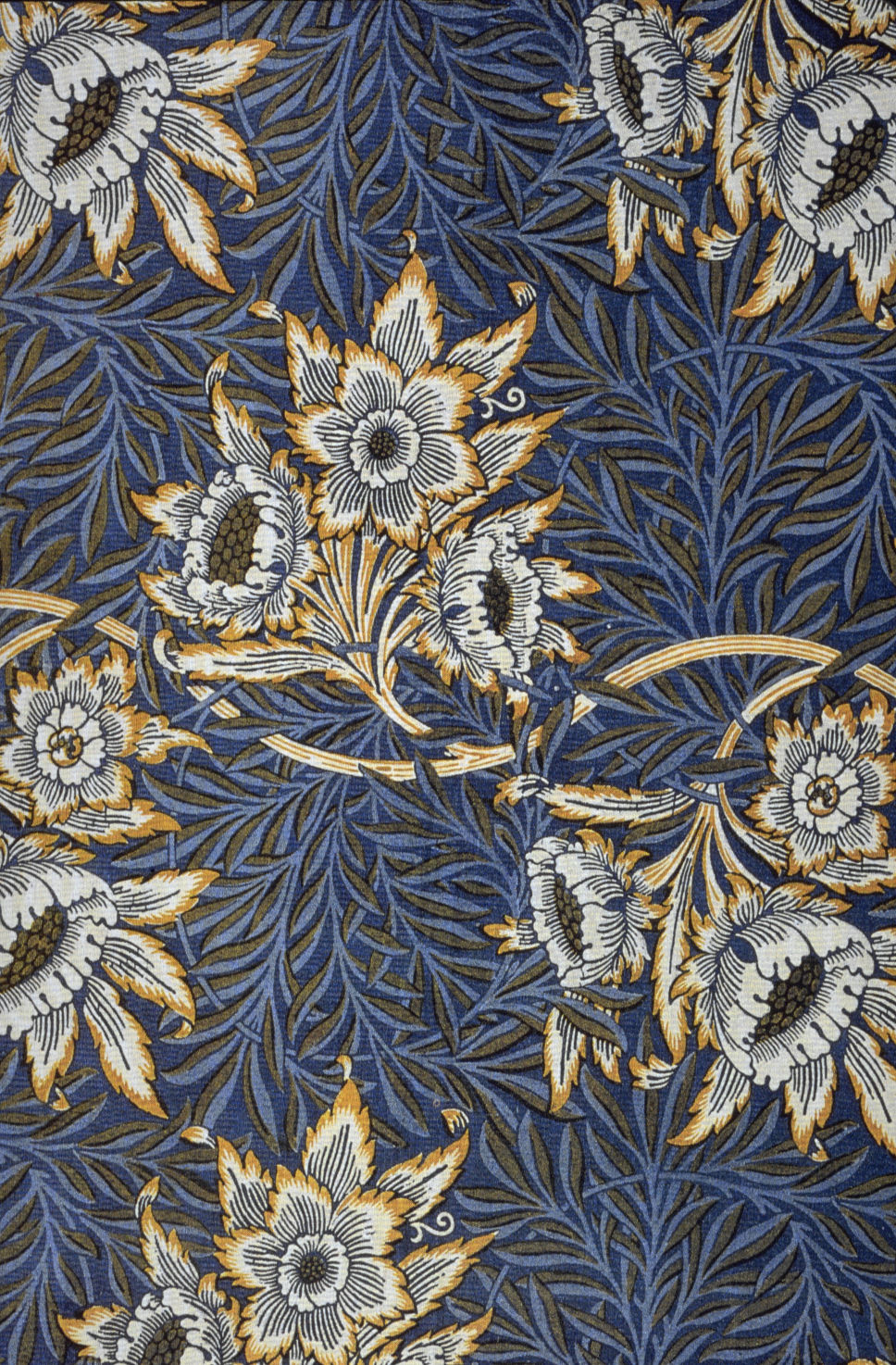
Tulip and willow design for printed textiles (1873)

William Morris (1834–1898), a founder of the British Arts and Crafts movement, sought to restore the prestige and methods of hand-made crafts, including textiles, in opposition to the 19th century tendency toward factory-produced textiles. With this goal in mind, he created his own workshop and designed dozens of patterns for hand-produced woven and printed cloth, upholstery, and other textiles.

== Embroidered textiles ==
The first textile designs Morris made were created in the 1860s and were for embroideries, expressing his interest in medieval arts and crafts, particularly the medieval wall hangings that he admired as a child. In a collection of essays by members of the Arts and Crafts movement published in 1893, he wrote that one of the aims of embroidery should be simply "The exhibition of beautiful material. Furthermore, it is not worth doing unless it is either very copious and rich, or very delicate - or both."

His first embroidery designs were primitive, but later, working with his wife Jane, he created a set of wall hangings for his residence in the London suburbs, Red House. One of his designs in this historical style, stitched by Jane Morris, won the Morris company an award in an international competition in 1862. Morris and his workshop began making embroideries for the households of his friends as well as larger panels for some of the many new churches being constructed in England. In these designs, Morris created the decorative elements, while his friend Edward Burne-Jones drew the figures, and a team of embroiderers manufactured the work by hand. Other wall hangings were designed to be sold off the shelf of the new Morris and Company shop on Oxford Street which owned in 1877. Later, he and his daughter May made designs for panels for "embroider yourself" kits for cushion covers, fireplace screens, doorway curtains, bedcovers and other household objects. In 1885, Morris turned production of embroidery entirely over to his daughter.

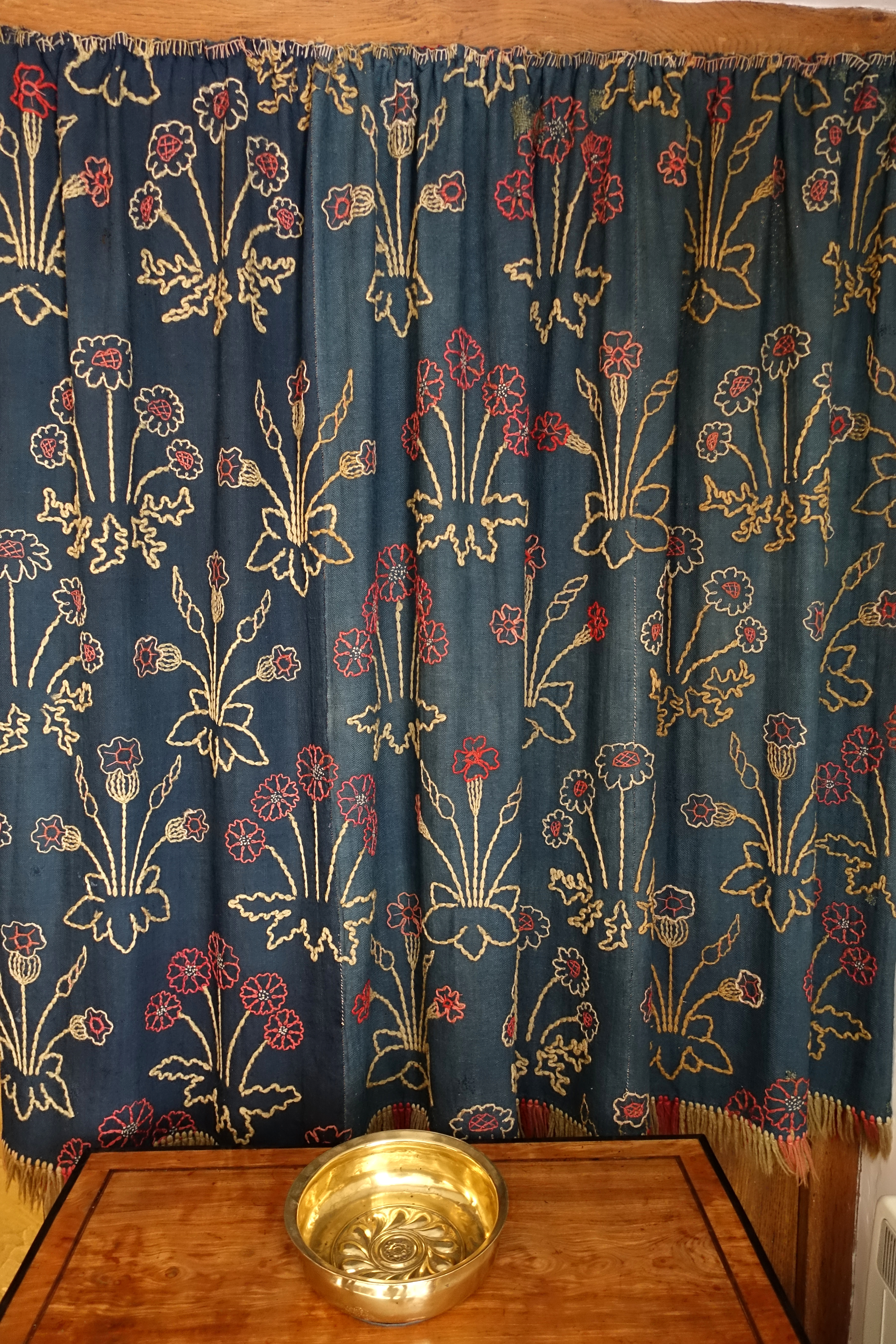
Daisy wall hanging by William and Jane Morris for Kelmscott Manor (1860)

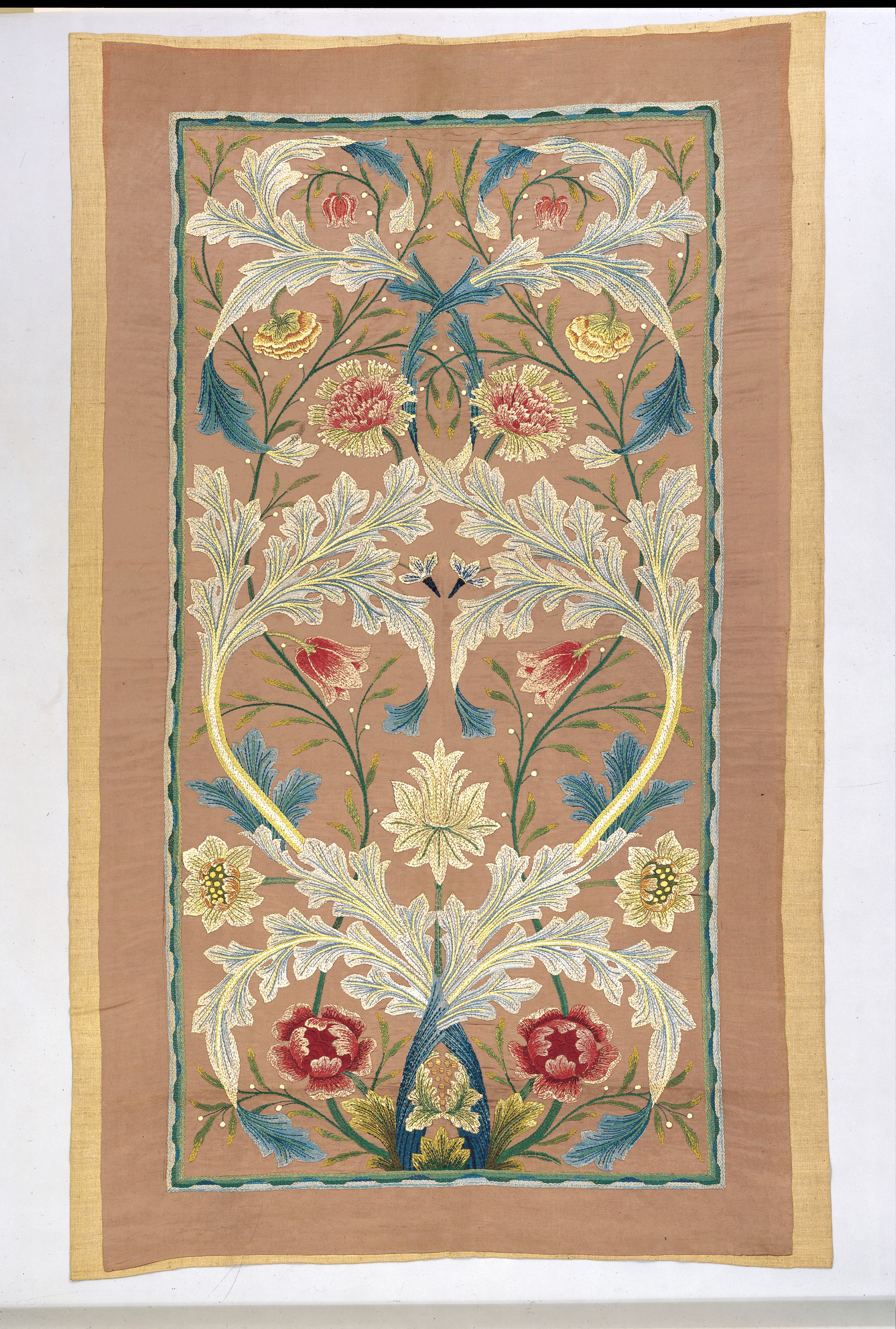
Panel of floral embroidery, silk on silk (c. 1875) (Metropolitan Museum of Art)

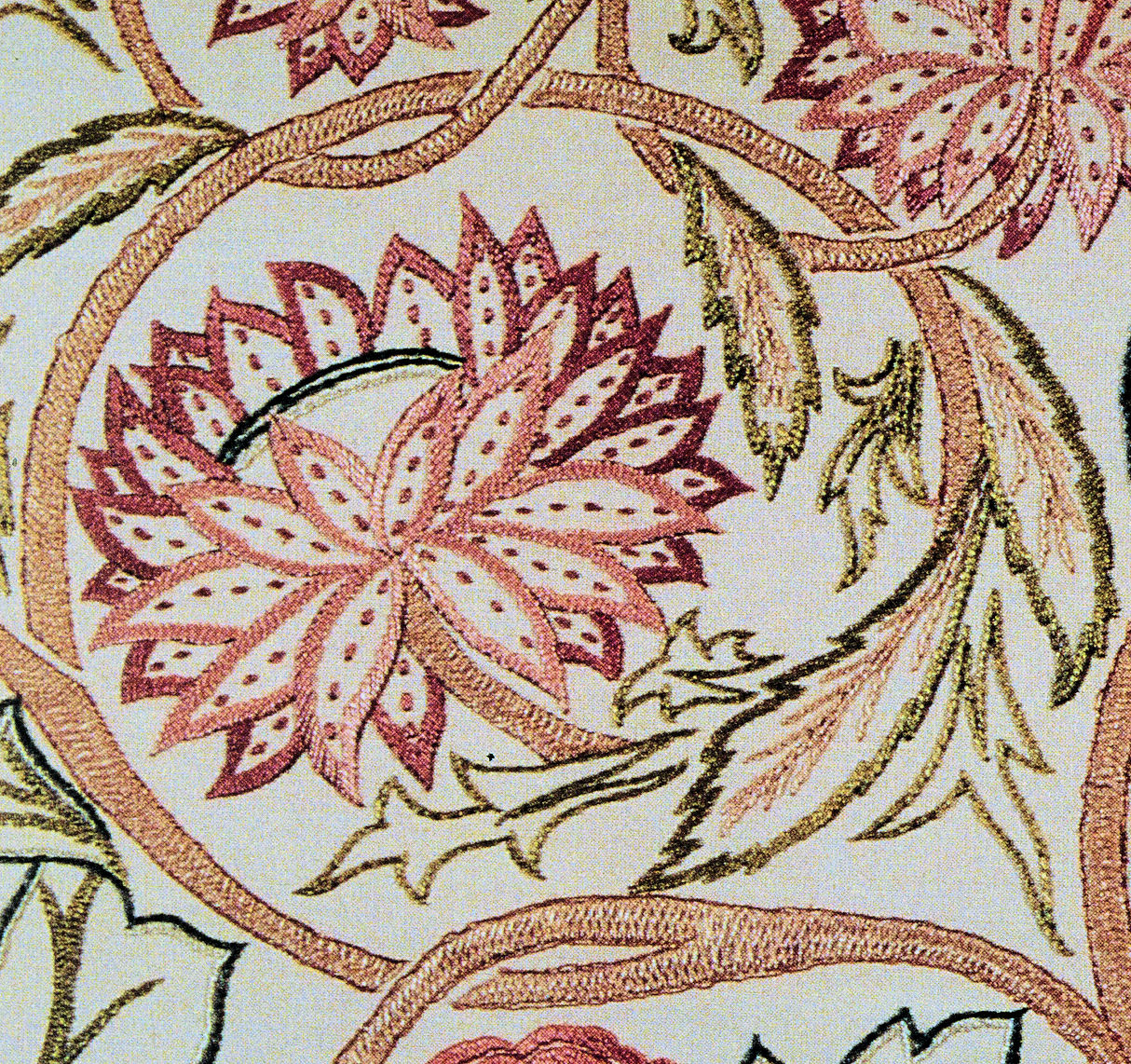
Detail of silk on linen embroidery for a pillowcase or fireplace screen by William Morris (1878)

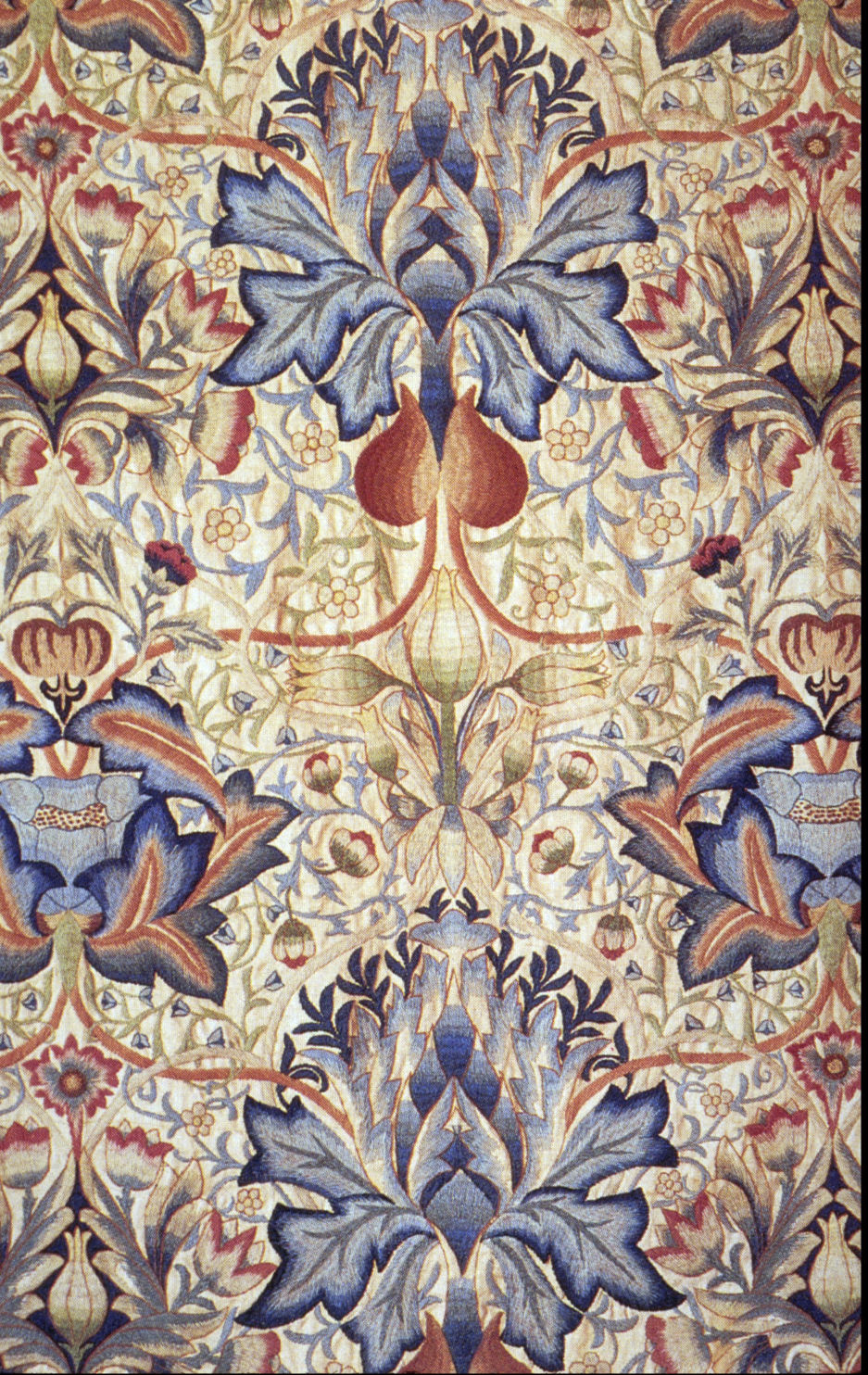
Embroidered wall hanging "Artichoke", wool on linen (1890)

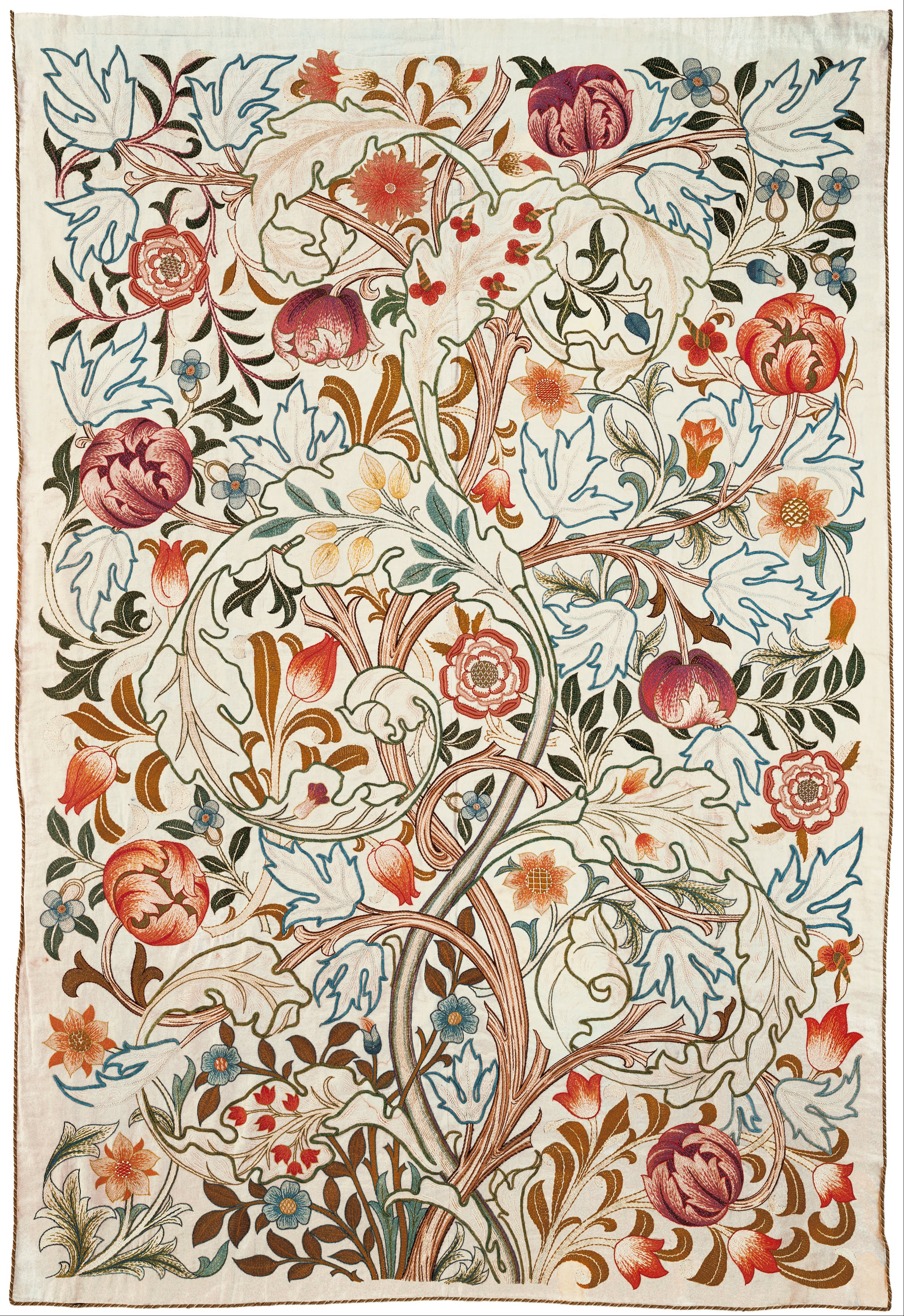
"Acanthus" door curtain, Morris and Company, silk on linen (1890s) (Art Gallery of South Australia)

== Furnishing textiles and woven fabrics ==
In the late 1860s Morris began to experiment with a genre, textiles for furnishing or upholstery. His first design was jasmine trail or jasmine trellis (1868–70), based on a similar wallpaper design he had made in 1862. In the 1870s, he expanded his activity in woven furnishing textiles. In 1877, he brought a skilled French silk weaver, Jacques Bazin, from Lyon to London, rented a studio at Great Esmond Yard, and established Bazin and his mechanical Jacquard loom there to make woven wooden fabrics.

In 1881, he opened new workshops at Merton Abbey, seven miles southwest of London, for manufacturing printed and woven textiles. The workshops were next to the River Wandle, providing a source of abundant clean water, and also had a grassy meadow where dyed clothes could be dried in the open air. He produced a number of furnishing fabrics there, including the Wey and Wandle designs.

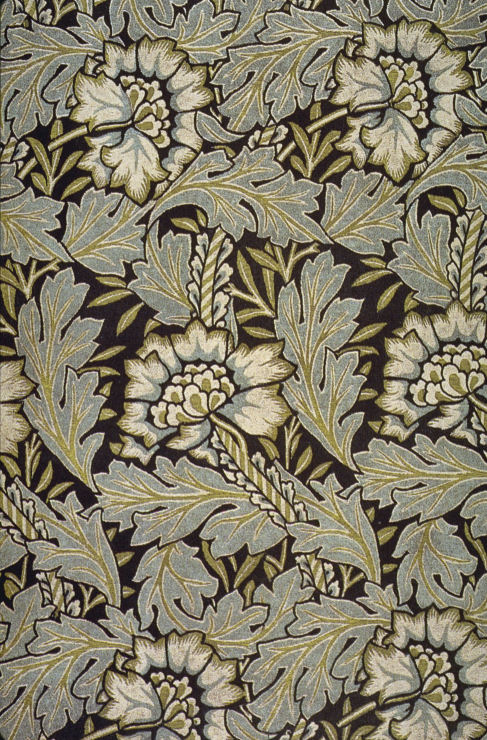
Anemone pattern jacquard-woven silk and wool or silk damask fabric (1876)

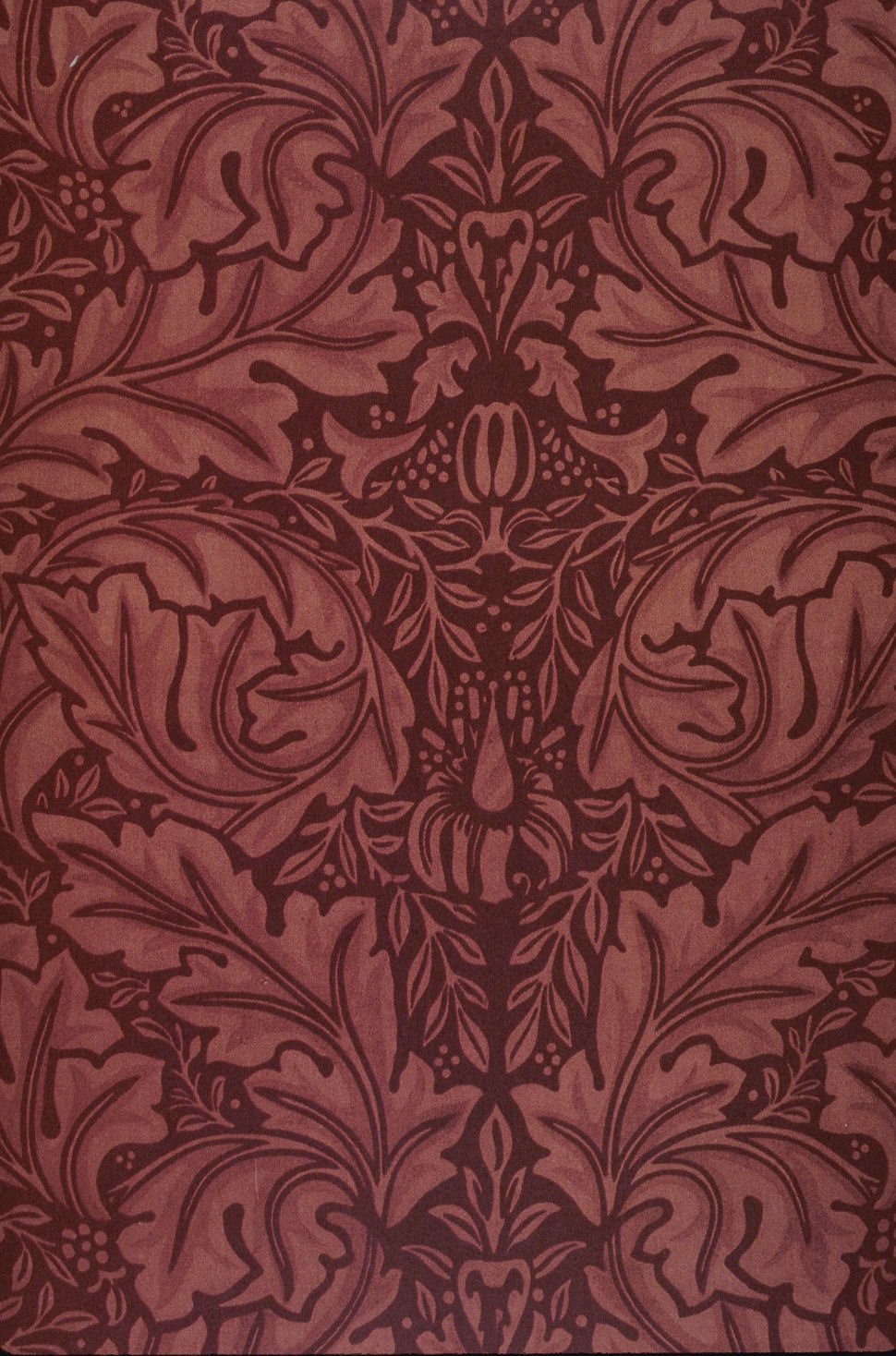
Acanthus design, block-printed velveteen cotton (1876)

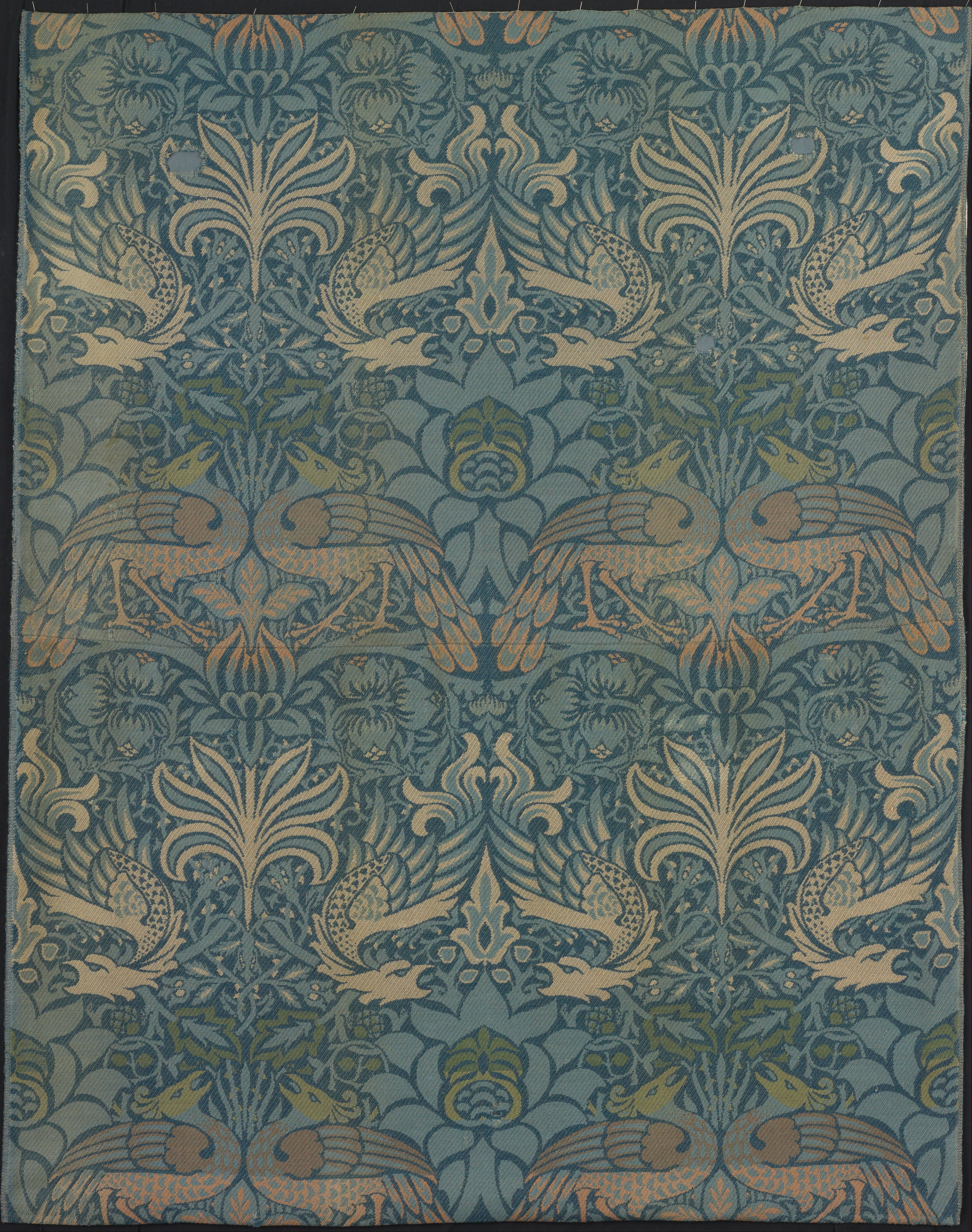
Peacock and Dragon design, woven wool (1878) (Art Institute of Chicago)

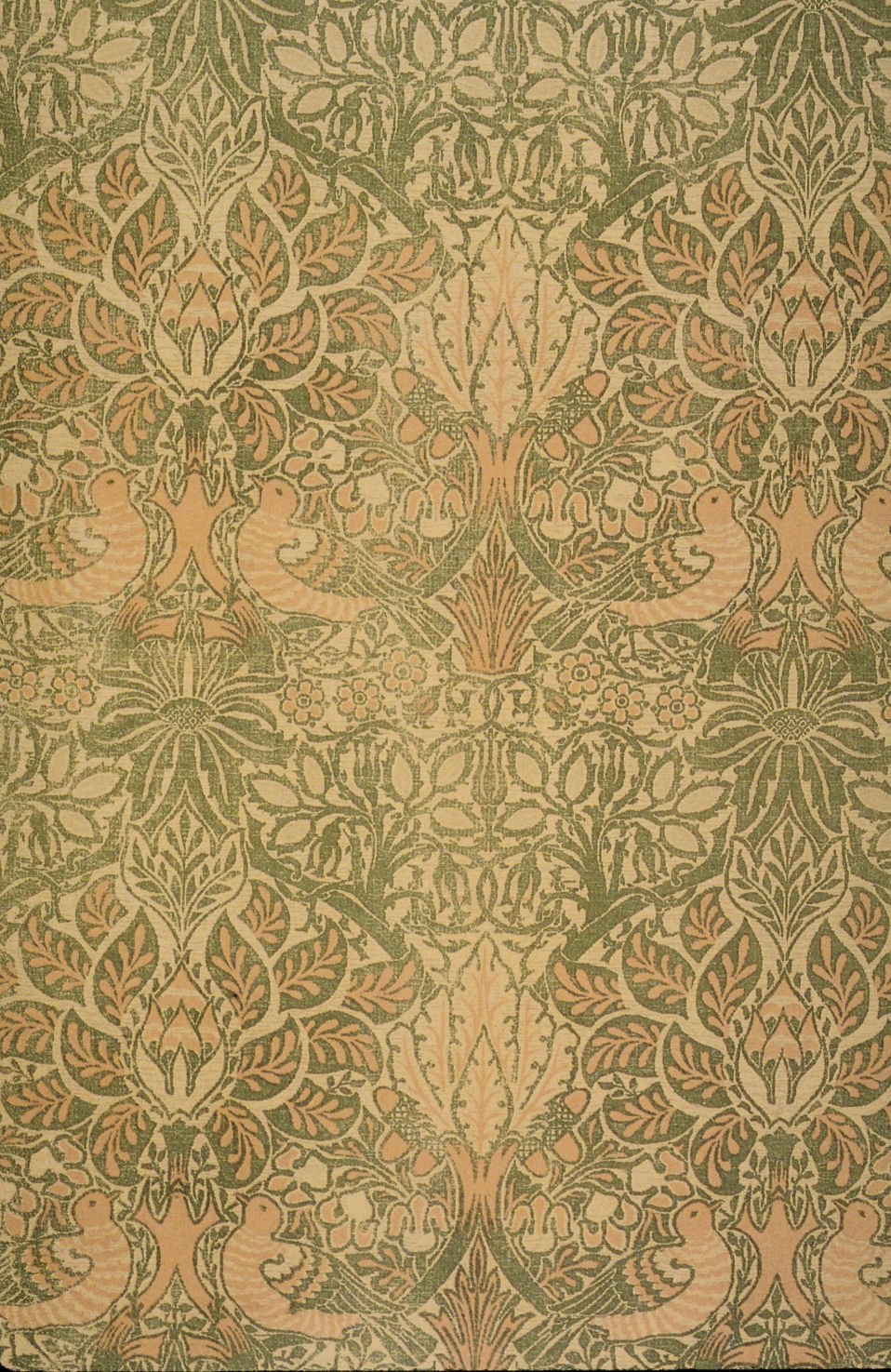
Dove and Rose design jacquard-woven silk and wool doublecloth furnishing textile,(1879)

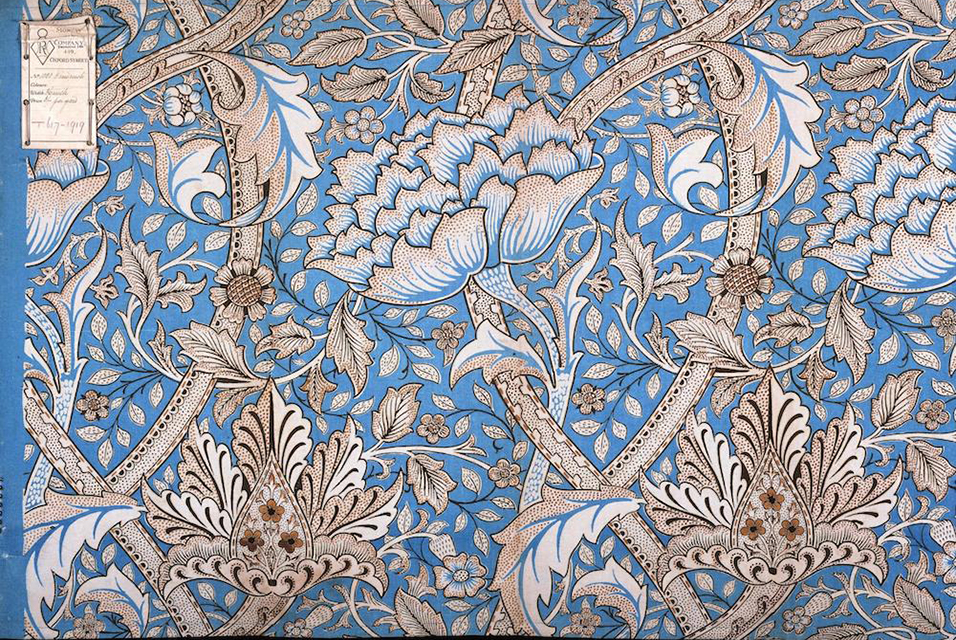
Furnishing fabric, block-printed at Merton Abbey (1882) (Victoria and Albert Museum)

== Printed textiles ==
Morris made his first experiments with printed textiles for his company Morris, Marshall, Faulkner and Co. beginning in 1868, at about the same time he was starting to make printed wallpaper (see William Morris wallpaper designs). These first textiles were recreations of earlier designs he had made from the 1830s, and were printed for Morris by the workshop of Thomas Clarkson of Bannister Hall, in Lancaster. His next textile was Trellis with jasmine (1868–70). This was printed with synthetic analine dyes. Next he made Tulip and Willow, a design he made in 1873, but he was very disappointed by the result. He blamed the problem on the artificial dyes, and began doing research into the natural dyes which had been used in the 16th century.

The Strawberry Thief became one of Morris's best-known designs. It depicted a scene from his own garden, where thrushes came to dine upon the ripe strawberries.

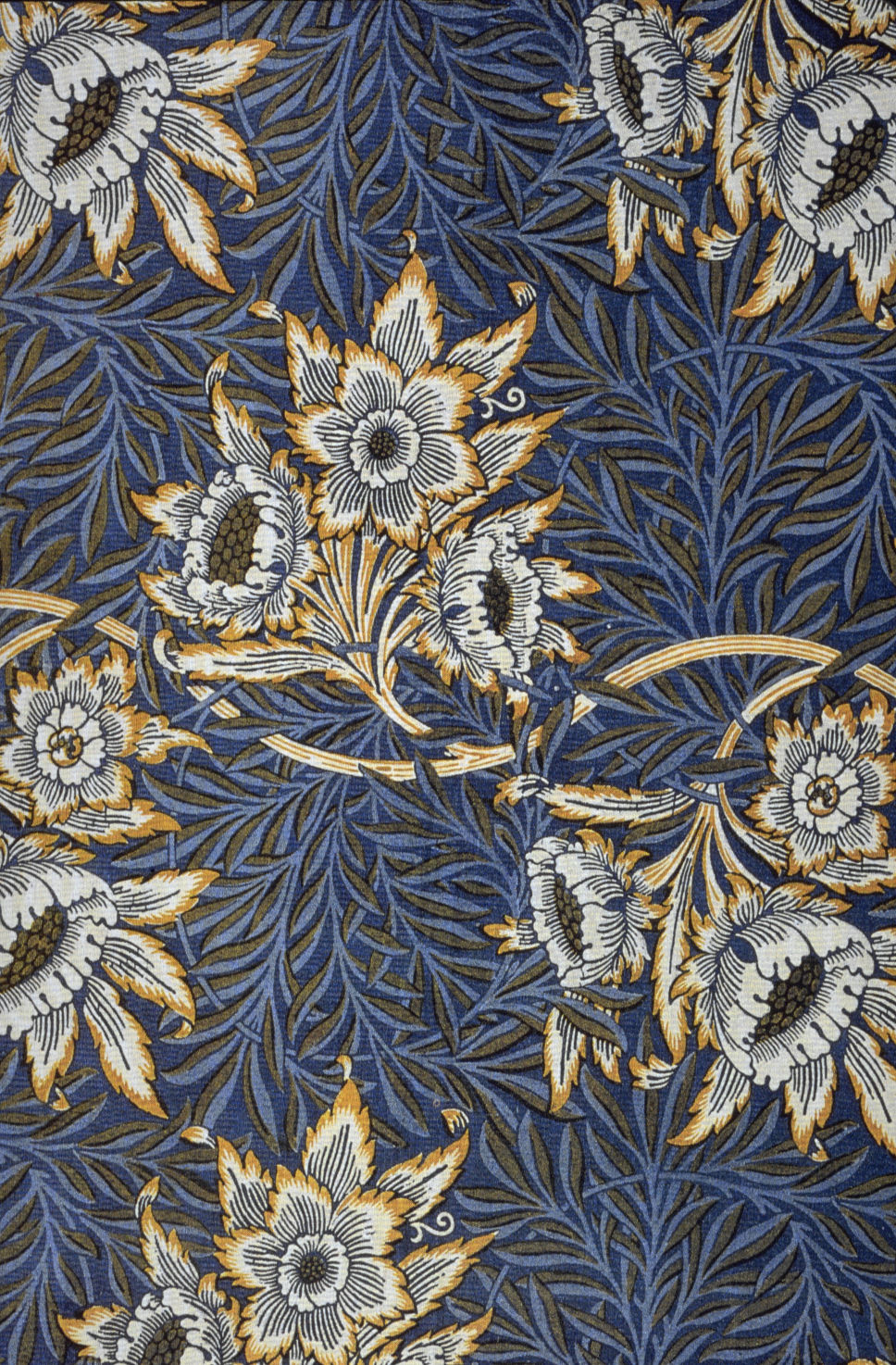
Tulip and willow design (Designed 1873)

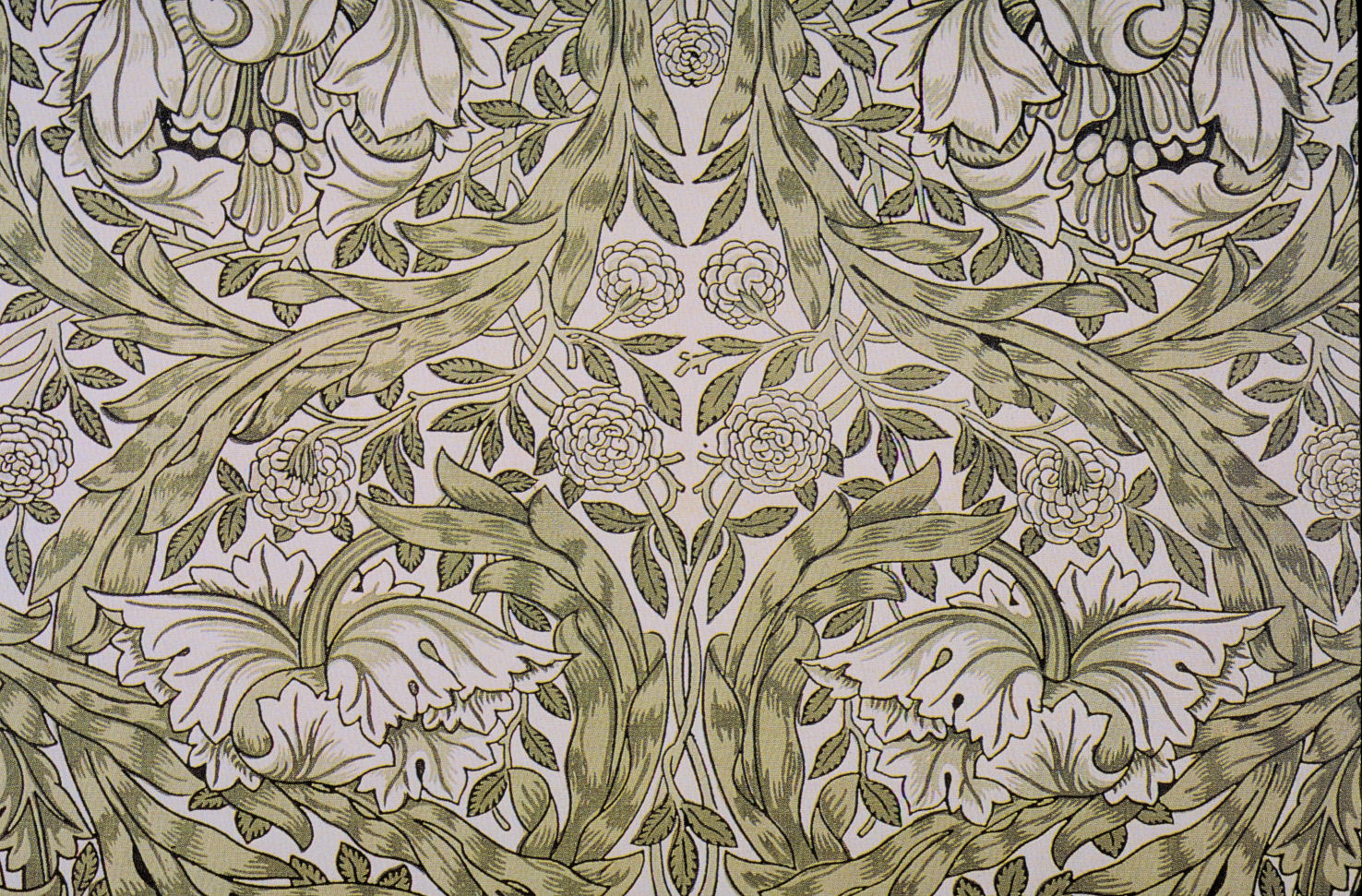
African marigold design (1876)

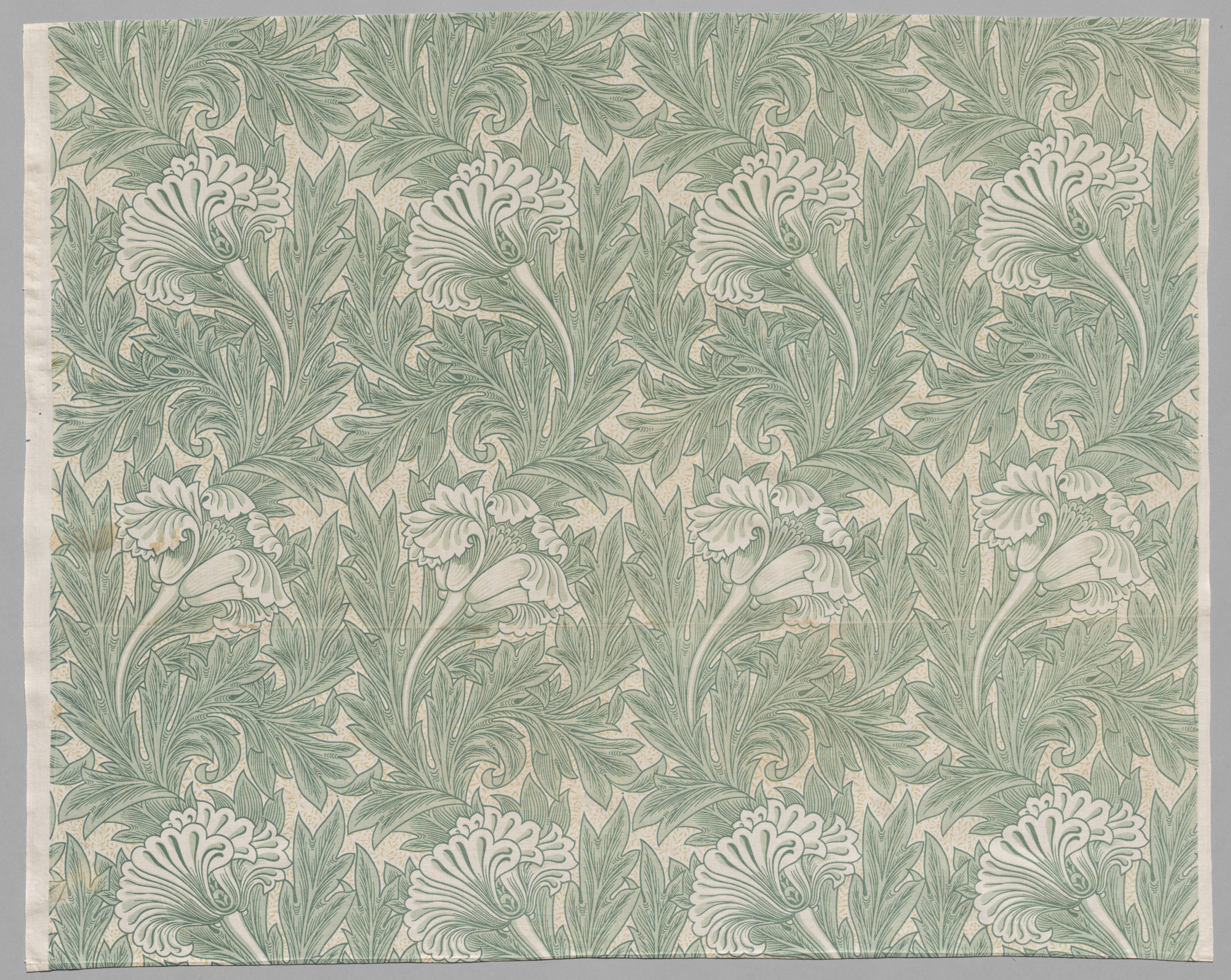
Tulip design on roller-printed cotton (Cleveland Art Museum) (1875)

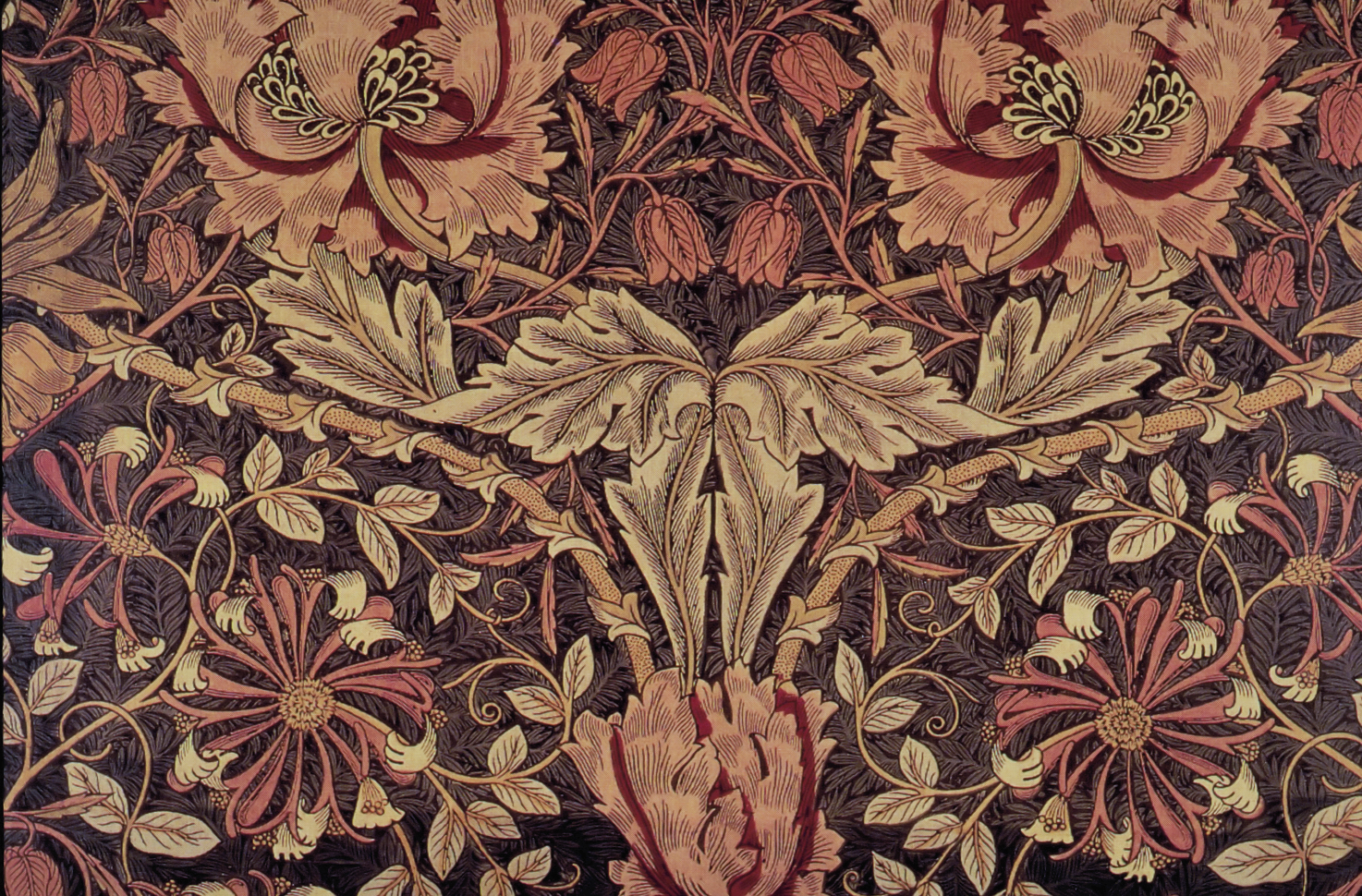
Honeysuckle design (1876)

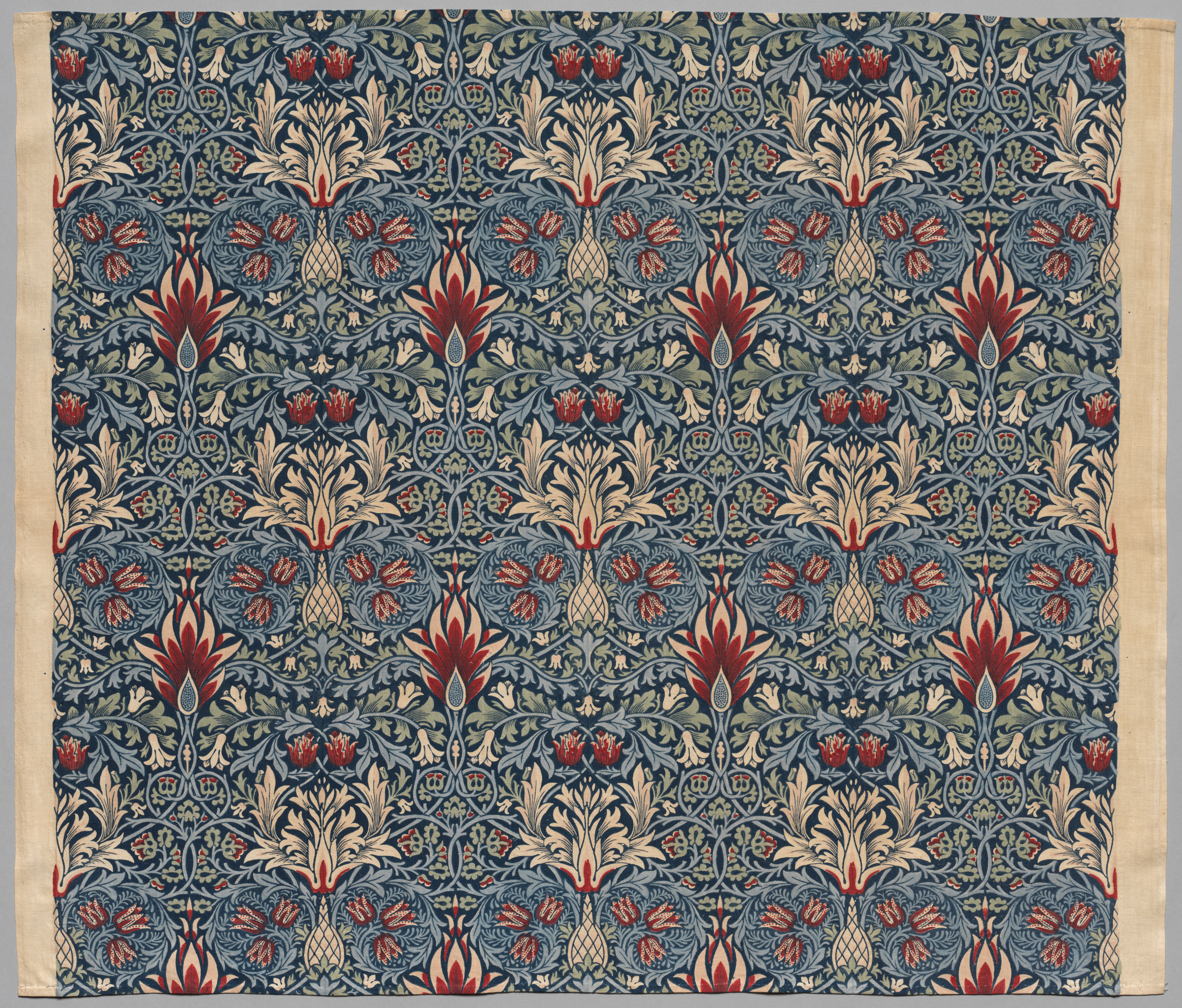
Snakeshead design (1877) (Cleveland Art Museum)

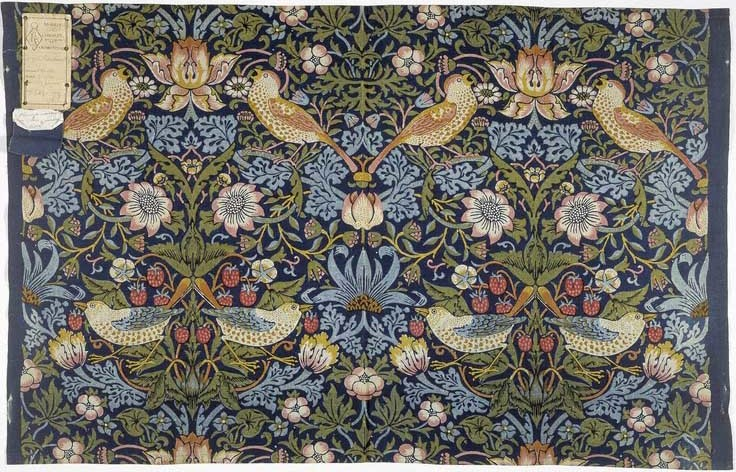
Strawberry Thief design (1883) (Victoria and Albert Museum)

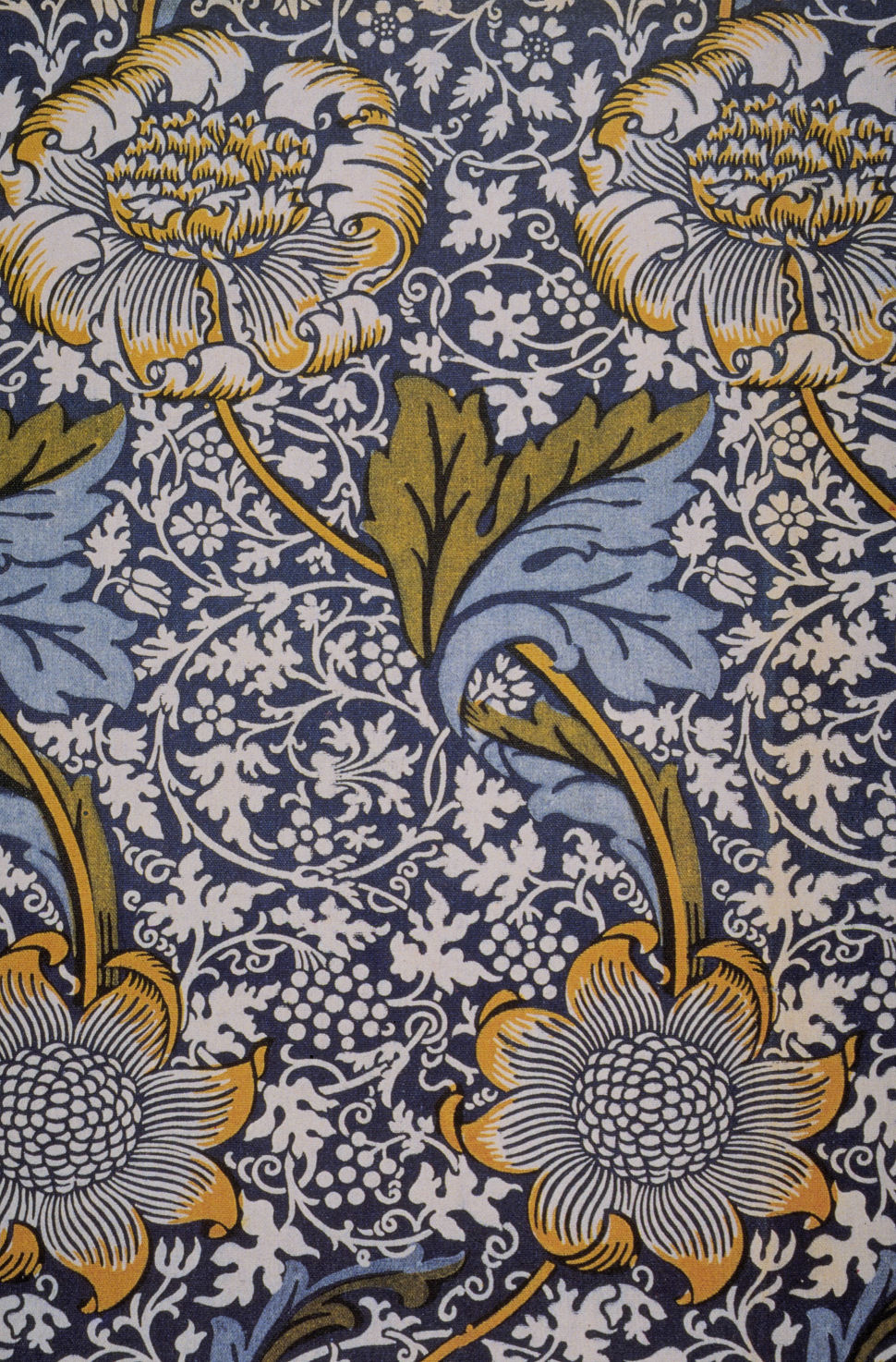
Indigo design printed textile (1883)

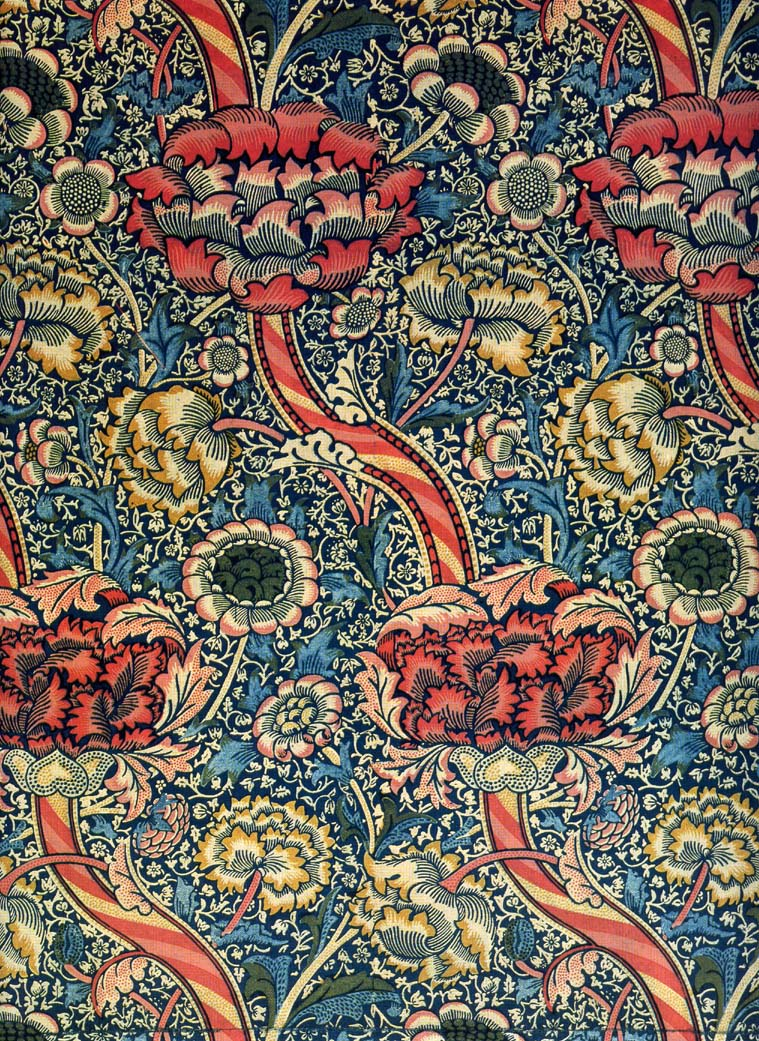
Wandle design printed fabric (1884)

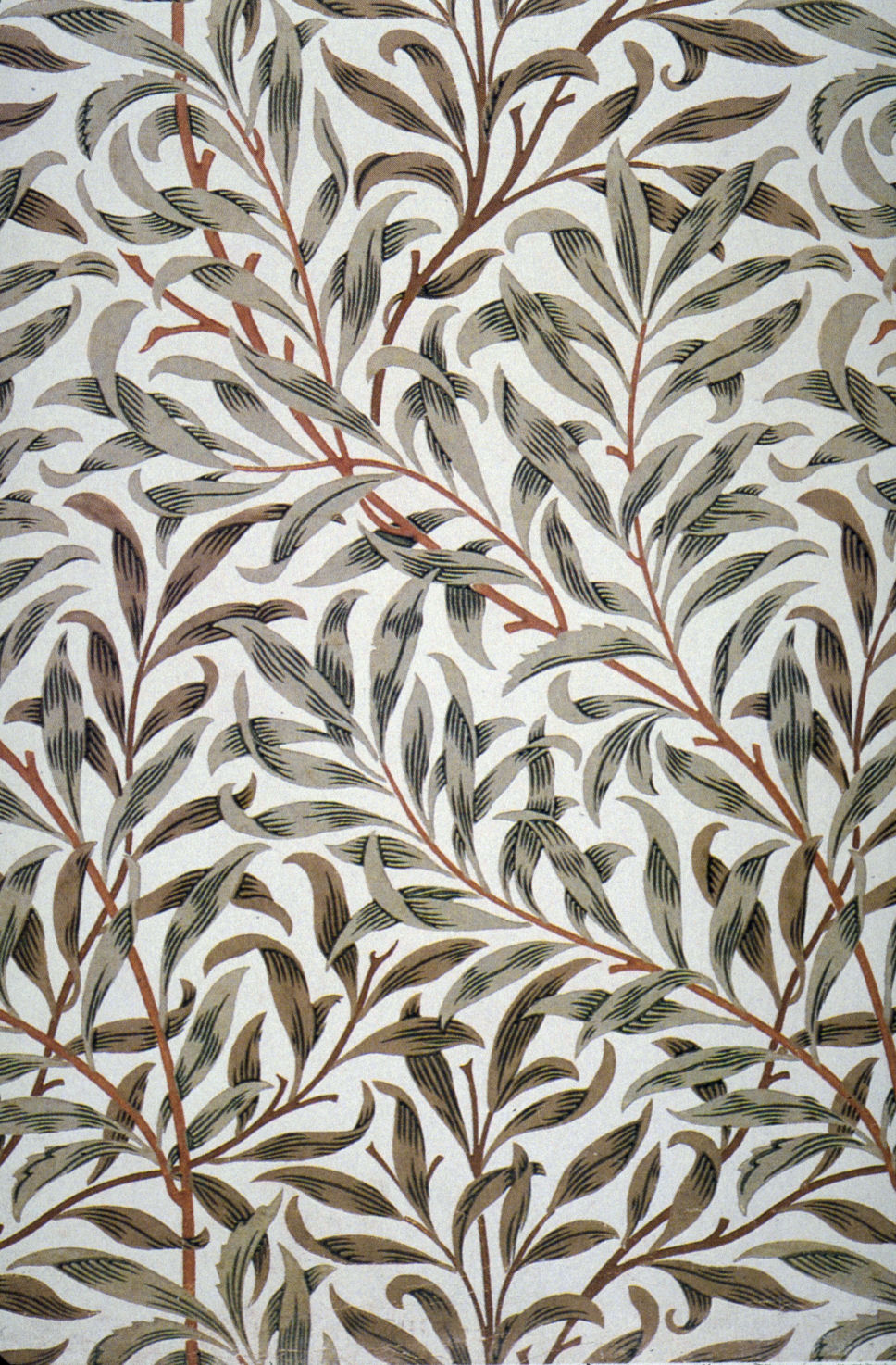
Willow bough (1887), [adapted from a wallpaper design)

Morris moved with his family to Turham Green in 1872, which created greater space in his house at Queen Square in London where Morris had his workshop. Morris and his assistant John Smith made a series of experiments with indigo and other natural dyes, but were unable to attain colours that satisfied Morris. In 1875, Morris tried working with a commercial printer, Wardle and Company, using wood blocks with a reduced number of colours and modern chemical dyes, This time he was dissatisfied with the lack of quality control by the workers, and the uneven results. He therefore decided to establish his own workshop, where he could control everything.

He moved his printing workshop to Merton Abbey Mills, near the Merton Abbey Priory. For printed textiles, the design was traced onto a block of pear wood, and then the wood was sculpted so only the desired surface would touch the fabric. Thin strips of brass were pounded edge-first into the block to make the fine lines. One block was used for each colour of the final fabric, The block was inked by placing into a vat of colorant, and then carefully placed onto the fabric on the table in front of the craftsman. He pounded it with a mallet to impress the colour, then he lifted the block carefully, moved the fabric, re-inked the block, and printed the next section with the same colour. When the first colour was finished, the finished fabric was set aside to dry. If more than one colour was used, once the fabric was dry, a block with the next colour would be inked and carefully impressed over the image left by the first. The same process and the same blocks could be used for making both fabrics and wallpaper. Since fifteen or more colours might be used, It was an extremely laborious and long process, sometimes lasting several weeks, and the cost was higher than that of mechanical printing methods.

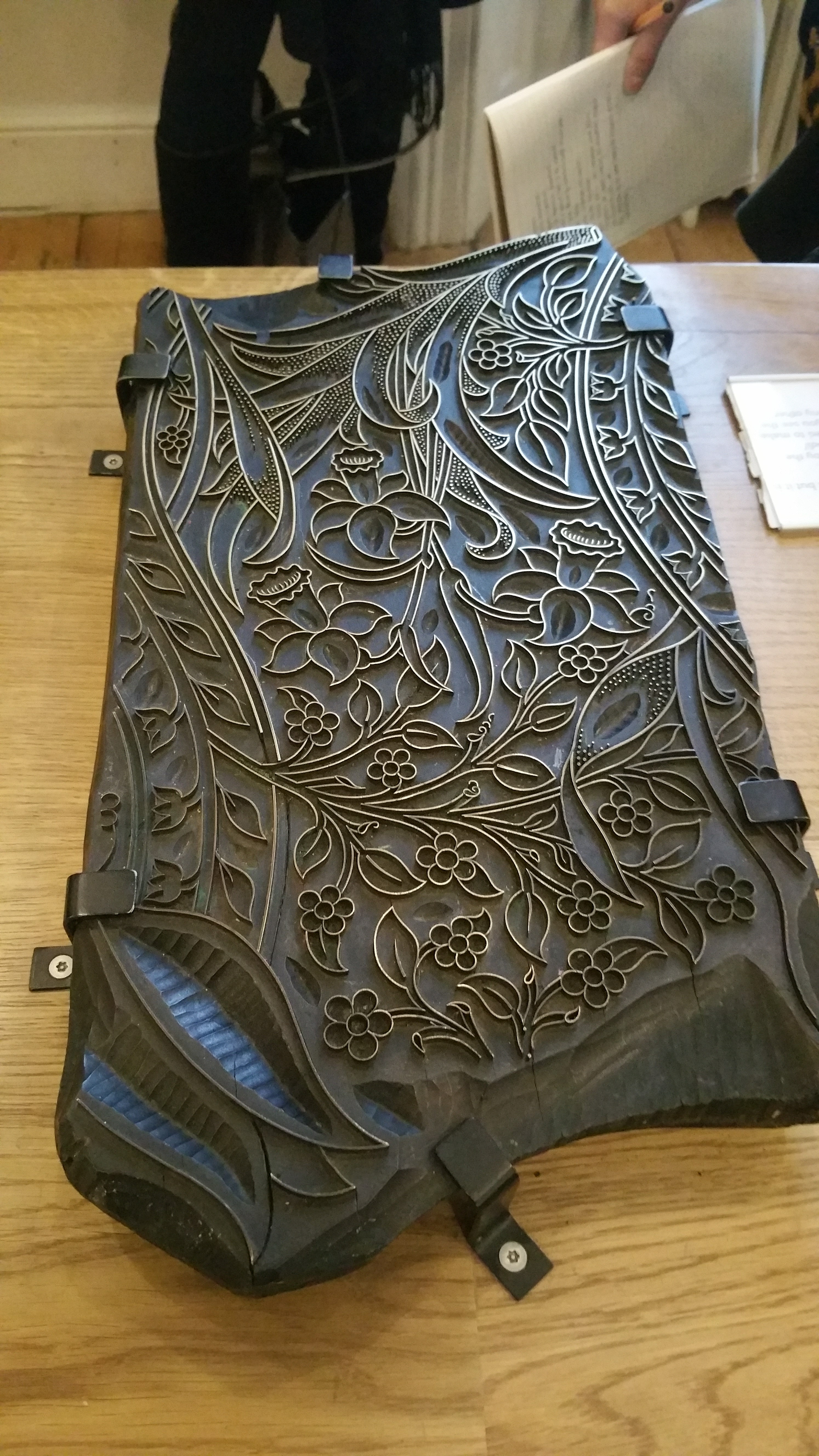
Wooden block for textile printing used by Morris Company

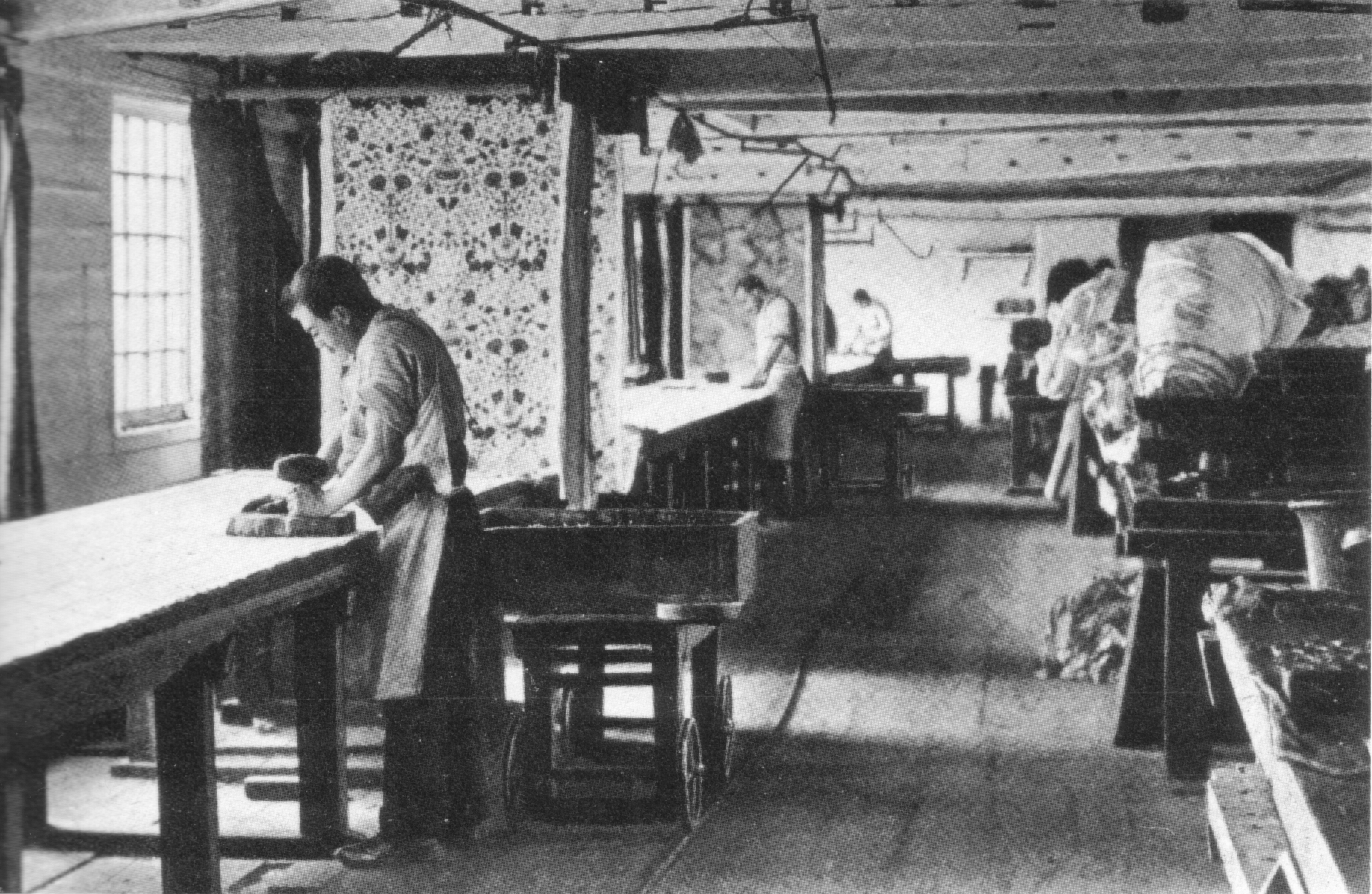
Textiles printed by hand at Merton Abbey (1890). Carts ran on a track behind the craftsmen, bringing them vats of fresh colours.

== Tapestries ==
Morris wrote that making tapestries was 'the noblest of all the weaving arts', and most suitable for his interest in reviving medieval arts and crafts. He set up his first tapestry loom in 1877, and made completed his first tapestry, was 'Acanthus and Vine' in (1879). He wove the tapestry himself, often getting up at dawn to work on a loom in his bedroom at Kelmscott House. His design was modelled after the "large leaf" tapestries woven in France and Flanders in the 16th century, and he deliberately gave them a faded appearance to make them look two centuries old. He recorded that it took him five hundred sixteen and one half hours to complete.

Once he had mastered the technique, he created a full-time tapestry workshop at the Morris and Company house on Queen Square. For most of his tapestries, Morris worked with other artists, particularly Edward Burne-Jones, who designed the figures, Philip Webb, who designed birds and animals, and with his primary assistant and successor as chief designer, John Henry Dearle. Burne-Jones made a drawing of the figures first, which was transformed into a color design by Morris or Dearle. A photographic image was made of the design with figures, to which Morris or Dearle added a floral background, and a border equally filled with designs of trees and flowers. The full scale image was transferred onto cloth by rubbing with a piece of ivory, and then woven on a loom. Large-scale tapestries were made in this way at Merton, mostly by the employment of boys ages thirteen and fourteen, who received shelter, board and a daily wage.

The most famous tapestries made by Burne-Jones and Morris were Holy Grail tapestries made for William Knox D'Arcy in 1890 for his dining room at Stanmore Hall Additional versions of the tapestries with minor variations were woven on commission by Morris & Co. over the next decade.

In addition to full-scale tapestries, the Merton Abbey workshop produced smaller works, designed as coverings for cushions and furniture. Multiple copies were made of some popular tapestries. Ten copies were made of The Adoration between 1890 and 1907.

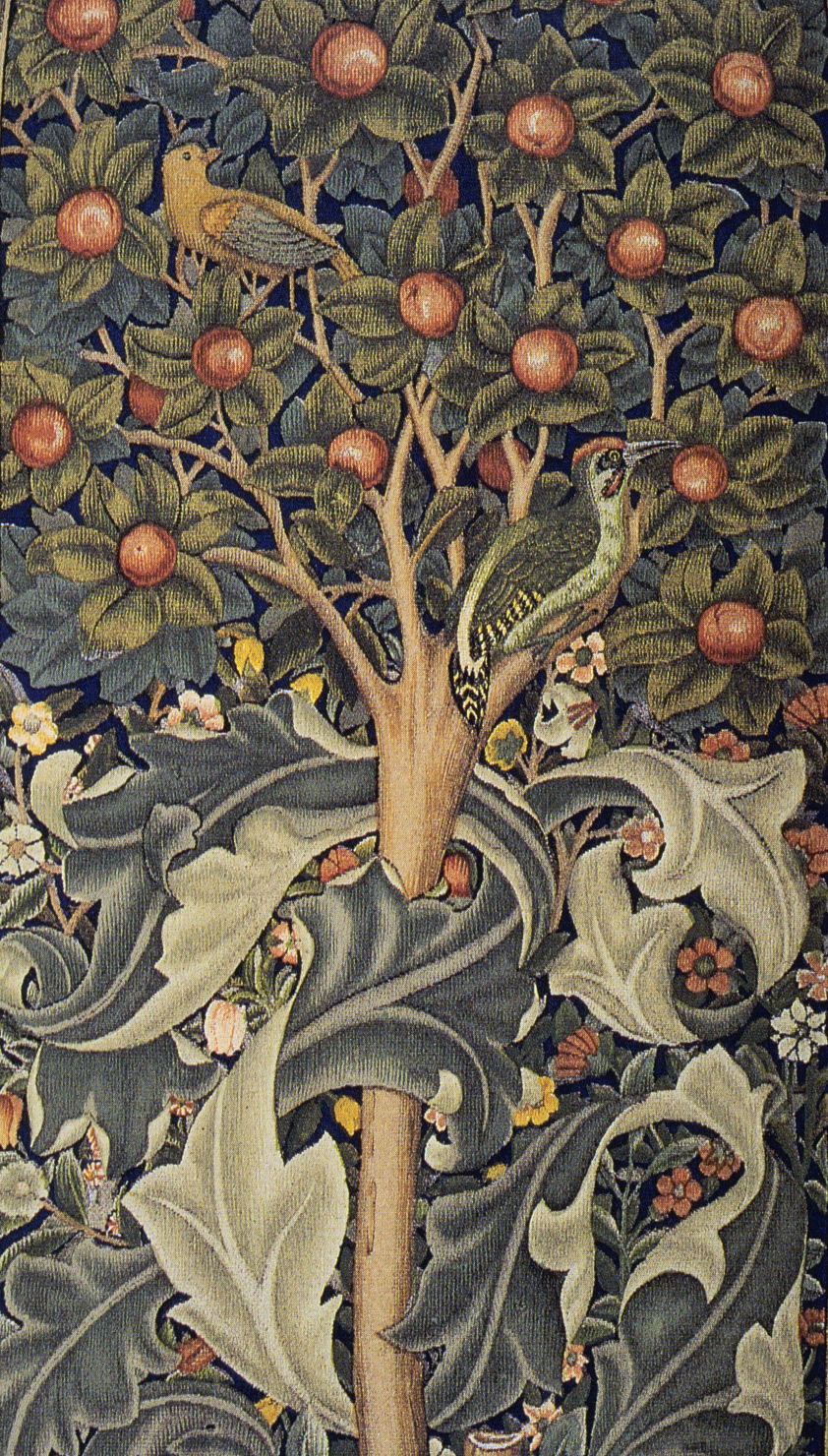
Woodpecker tapestry detail (1885)

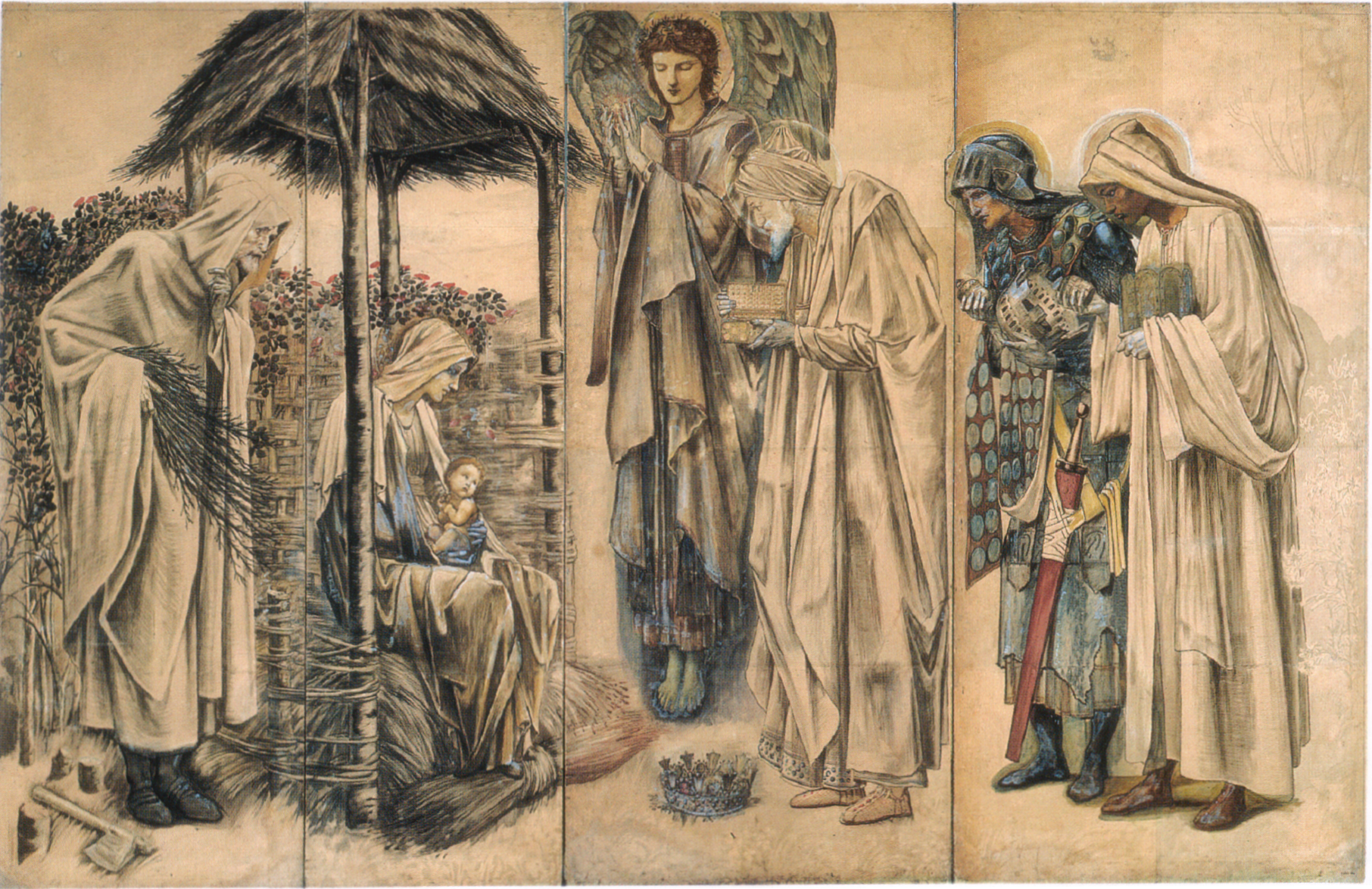
Cartoon of the Adoration of the Magi with figures by Edward Burne-Jones on photographic paper

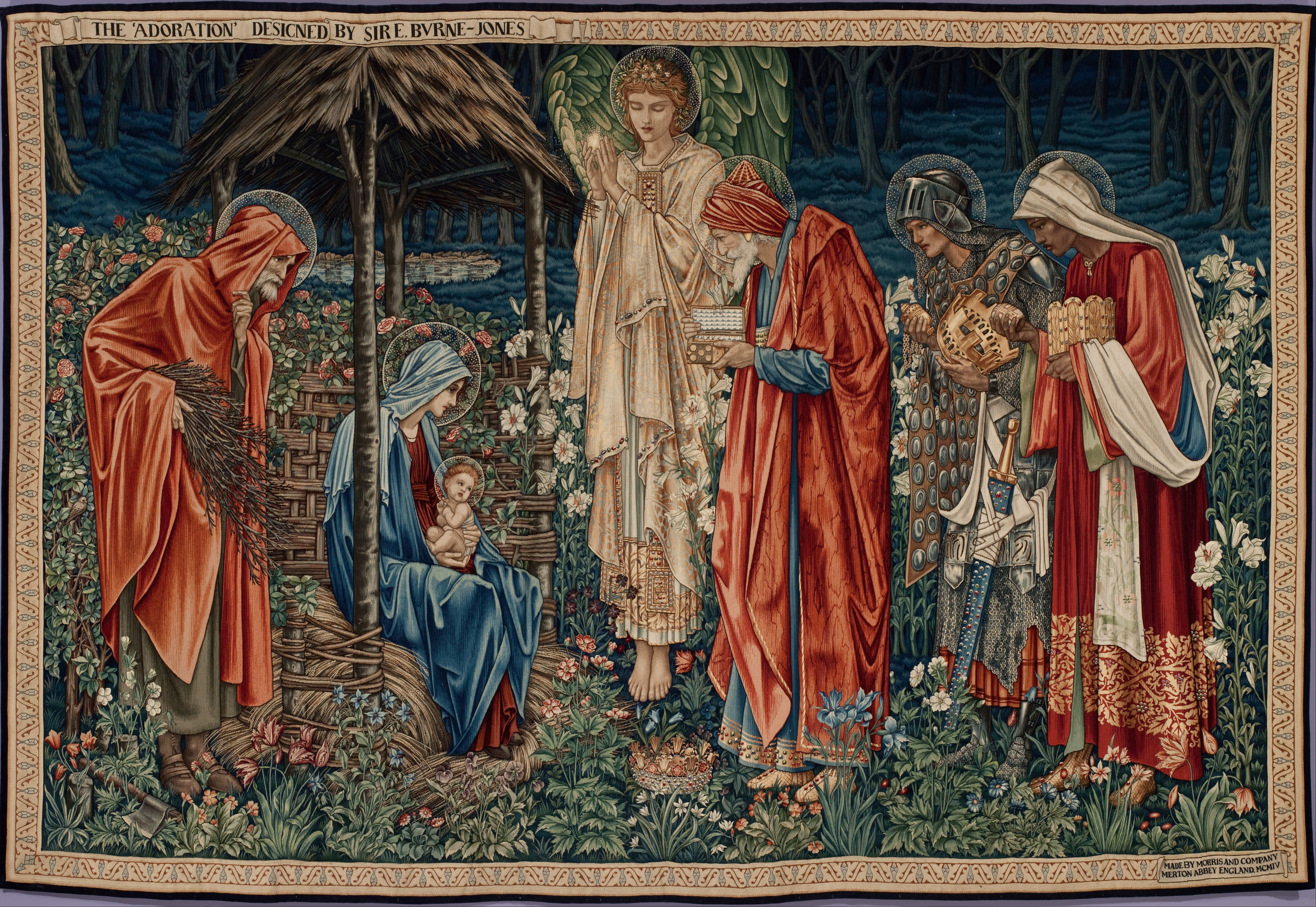
Completed Adoration of the Magi, figures by Edward Burne-Jones, decoration by Morris and J.H. Dearle (1890–97)(Musée d'Orsay)

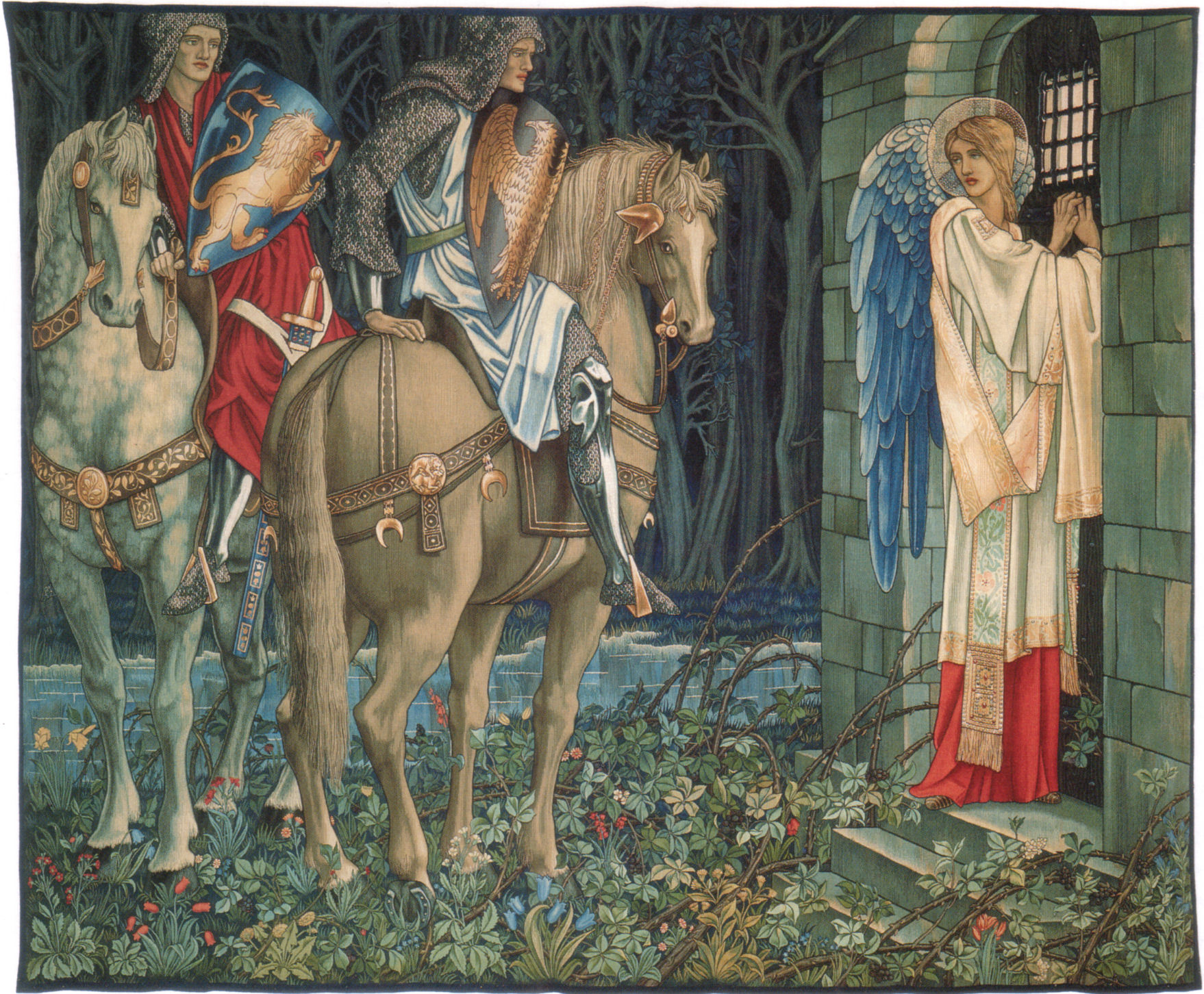
Holy Grail tapestries (1890s). Figures by Edward Burne-Jones, overall conception by Morris, floral designs by J.H. Dearle. Wool and silk on cotton warp. (Birmingham Museum and Art Gallery)

== Carpets ==
In March 1875 Morris became the sole owner of what became William Morris Company, buying out the shares of his partners. He decided to diversify the products by adding carpets, a market that was almost totally dominated by original or imitation oriental carpets. Within three months, he had registered his first design for the Cataline floor cloth, a decorative covering for linoleum floors, a material which had been invented in 1855. By December had registered two designs for machine-woven carpets which he had made by the Wilton Royal Carpet Factory.

As usual, Morris set a high goal for himself. His aim, he declared, was to make England independent of the Orient for the provision of hand-made carpets which aspire to the status of art. He made a careful study of techniques and materials, and made a series of experiments. When he moved to Kelmscott House in 1879 he began to produce a series of carpets called Hammersmith. He hired a labor force of young women to work on looms he set up in the former stables and garage of his London residence. He also revived the art of hand-knotting for making small carpets.

In the 1880s, in addition to the Hammersmith carpets, Morris created series of designs for machine-made Axminster and Kidderminister carpets, made at the Wilton factory or at Heckmondwike Manufacturing company in Yorkshire. Many of the carpets he designed used the patterns he had invented for printed fabrics, but others, particularly the Hammersmith carpets, resembled the designs he made for his woven textiles. His early carpets sometimes borrowed popular oriental motifs. The designs he made for Axminister and Wilton carpets were less lavish in their ornament and more geometrical, to make them more affordable.

In 1881 he moved the workshop to Merton Abbey, where there was space to weave much larger carpets commissioned by his clients. His designs for these large Hammersmith carpets moved farther away from the Oriental influence, and took on a more specifically English style. As with his wallpapers other textiles, his inspirations were most often flowers, plants and animals found in English gardens.

One particularly notable design was the Bullerswood carpet, was made in 1889 for the wool trader John Sanderson, who had a country residence called Bullerswood in Chislehurst, Kent. Morris made two versions of the carpet for the house, in collaboration with his assistant John Henry Dearle. Extremely complex, they were virtual anthologies of all of the motifs of Morris. Morris made one carpet for the living room and another for the front hallway. He also strictly supervised the decoration of these rooms, so it would be in harmony with the carpet.

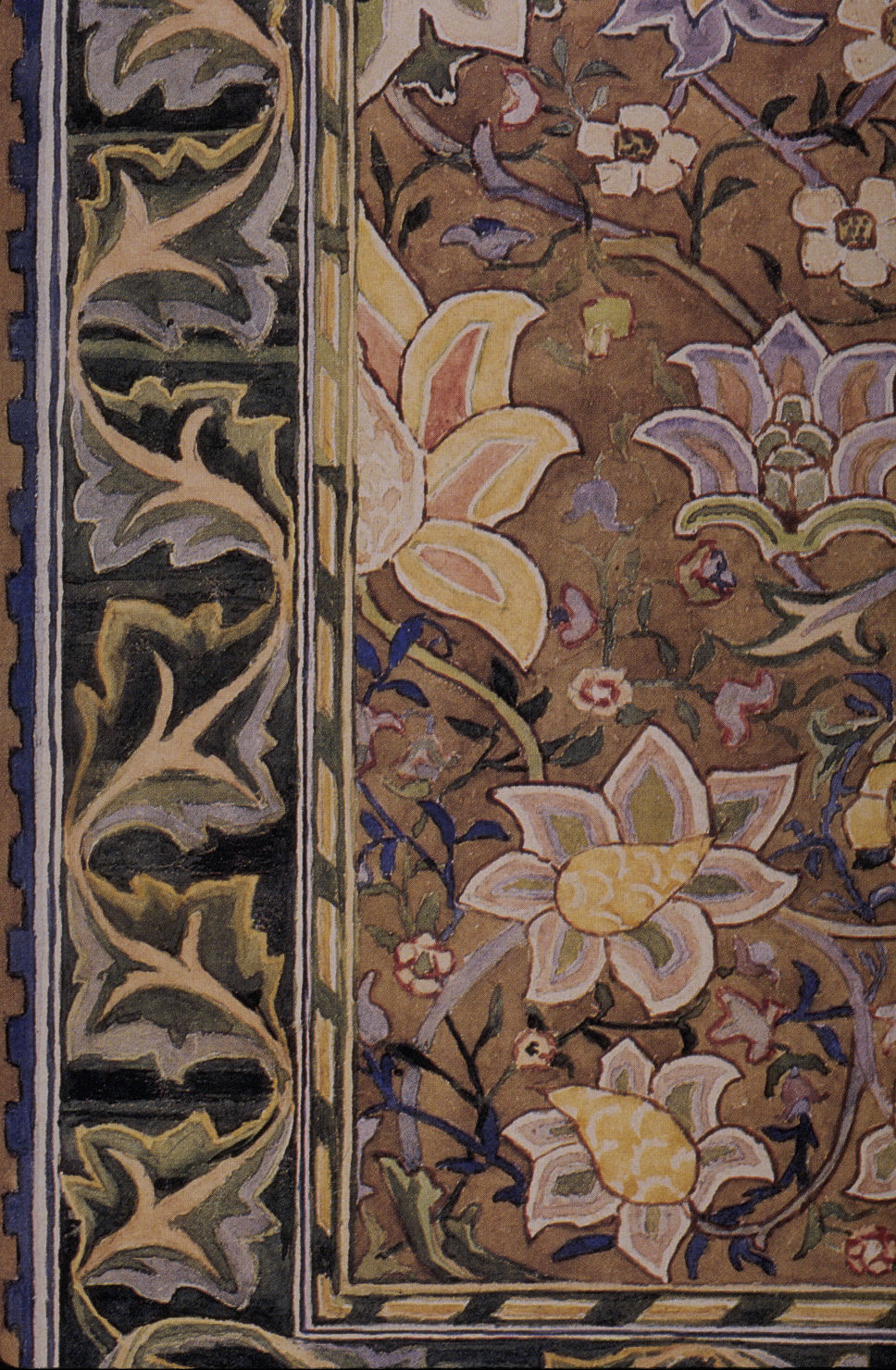
Redcar carpet design by Morris (1881–85)

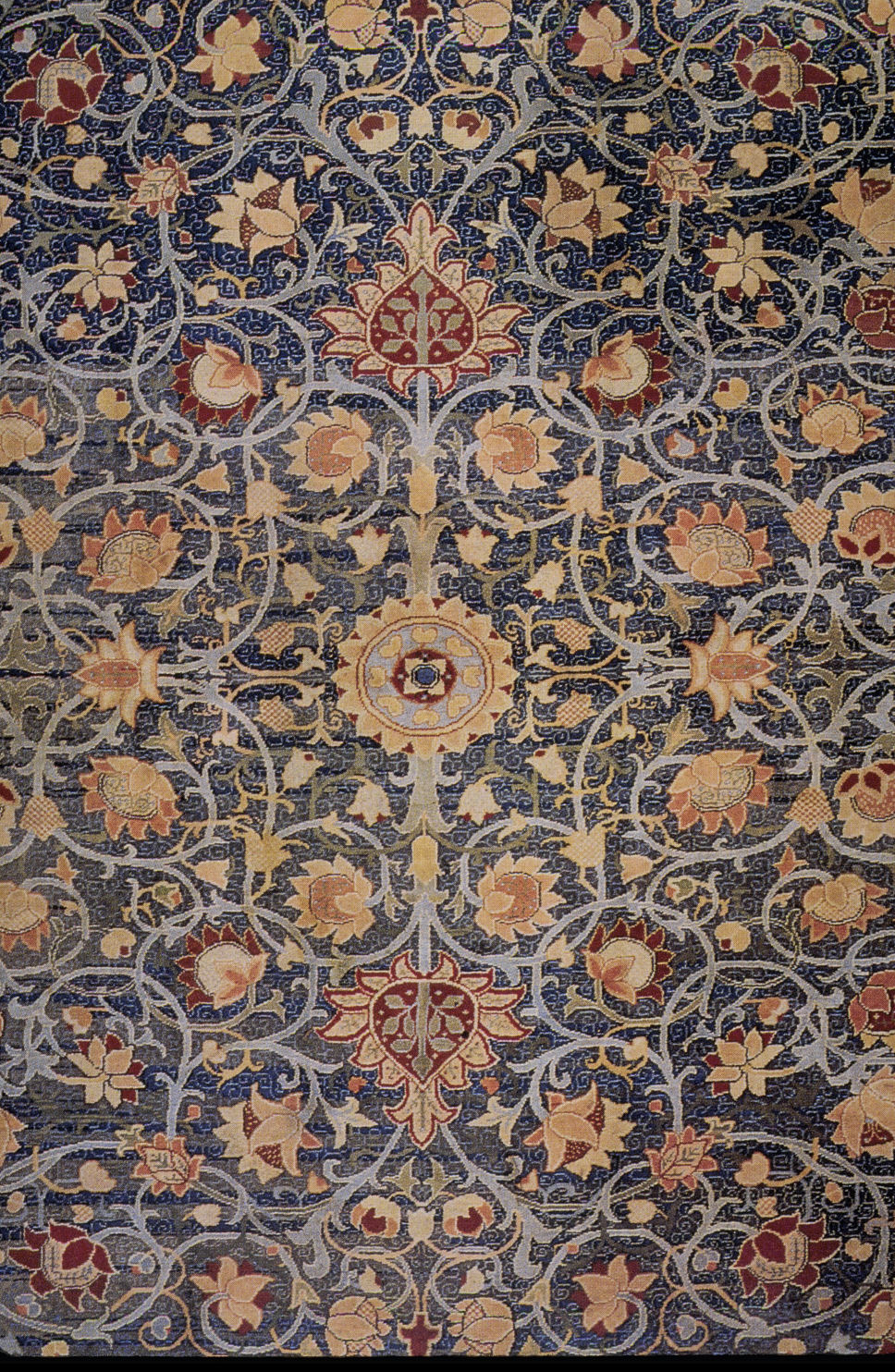
Holland Park carpet detail (1883)

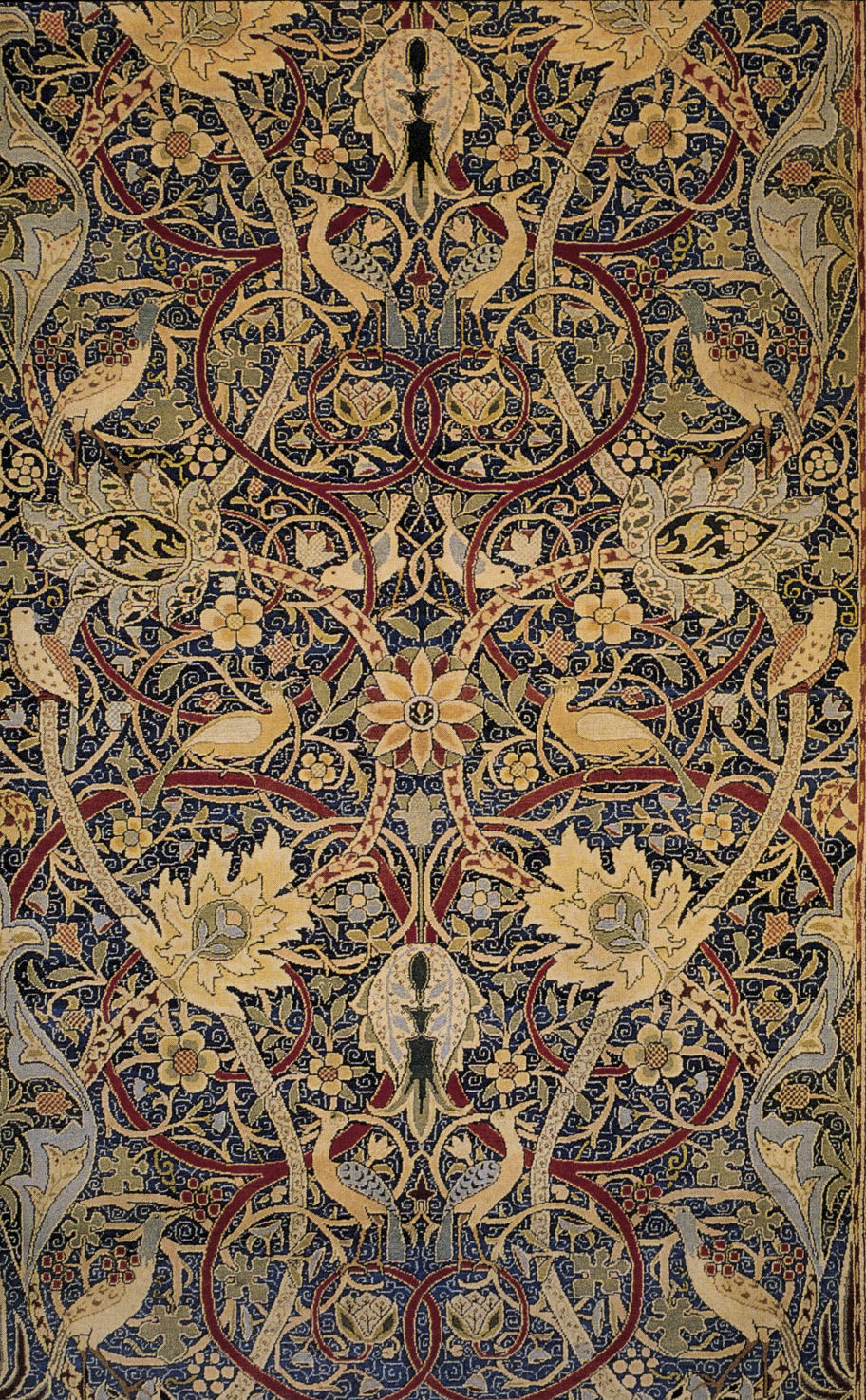
Bullerswood Carpet detail (1889)

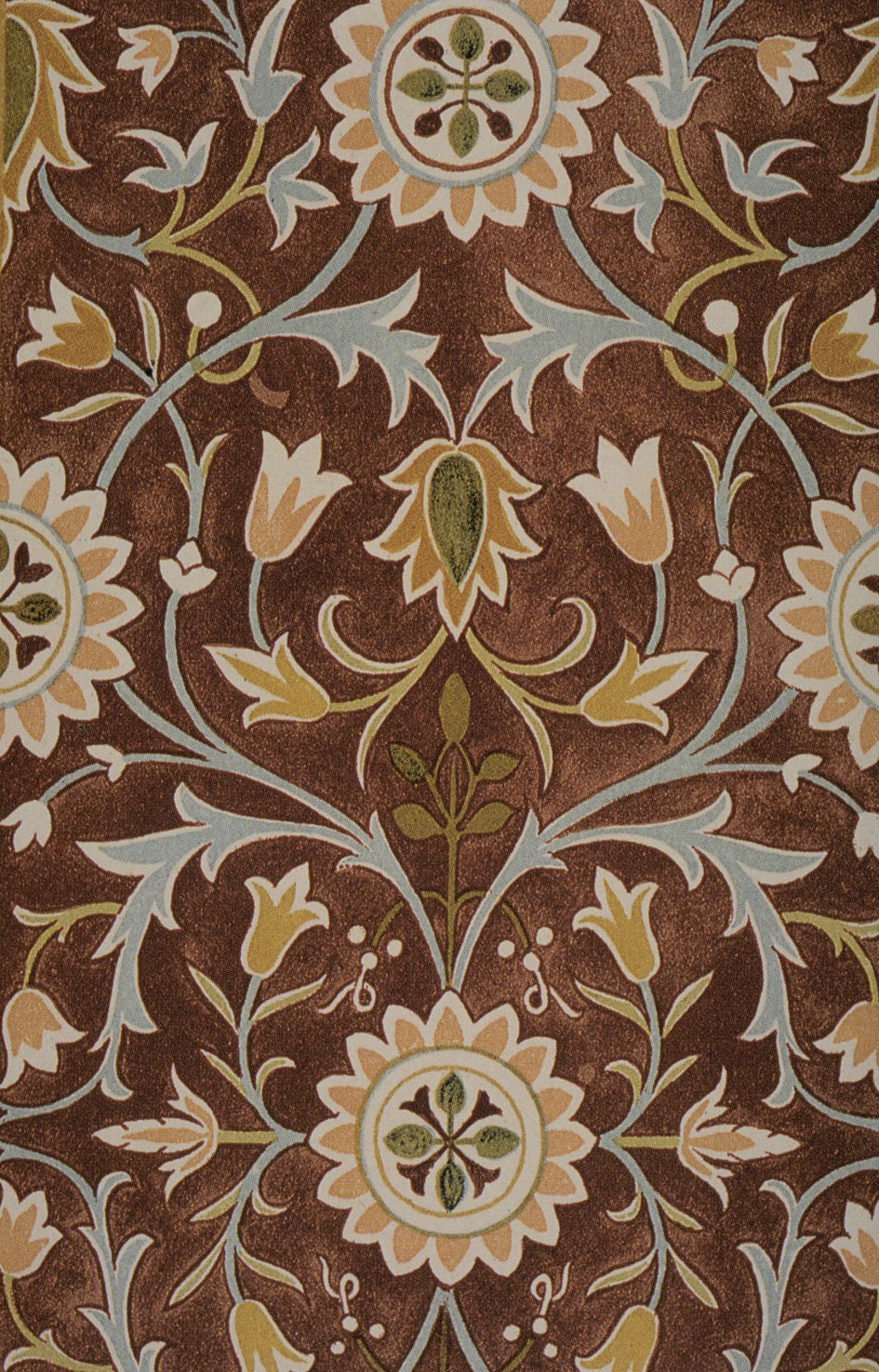
Watercolour design by Morris for the Little Flower carpet

== The William Morris style ==
Morris explained his ideas about textile designs in a group of essays by members of the Arts and Crafts movement published in 1893. In his essay on textiles, Morris wrote: "The aim should be to combine clearness of form and firmness of structure with the mystery which comes of abundance and richness of detail...Do not introduce any lines or objects which cannot be explained by the structure of the pattern; it is just this logical sequence of form, this growth which looks as if, under the circumstances, it could not have been otherwise, which prevents the eye wearying of the repetition of the pattern."

"...Do not be afraid of large patterns; if properly designed they are more restful to the eye than small ones...Very small rooms, as well as very large ones, look best ornamented with large patterns."

"...As final maxims, never forget the material you are working with, and try always to use it for doing what it can do best: if you feel yourself hampered by the material in which you are working, instead of being helped by it, you have so far not learned your business, any more than a would-be poet has, who complains of the hardship of writing in measure and rhyme."

In the same group of 1893 essays, he expressed his views of tapestry designs. He wrote: "As in all wall decoration, the first thing to be considered in designing of Tapestry is the force, purity and elegance of the silhouette of the objects represented, and nothing vague or indeterminate is admissible. But special excellencies can be expected from it. Depth of tone, richness of colour, and exquisite gradation of tints are easily to be obtained in Tapestry; and it also demands that crispness and abundance of beautiful detail which was the especial characteristic of fully developed Medieval Art. The style of even the best period of the Renaissance is wholly unfit for Tapestry; accordingly, we find that Tapestry retained its Gothic character longer than any other of the pictorial arts."

In writing about textiles, Morris emphasised the importance of using natural dyes and colours. "These colours in fading still remain beautiful," he wrote, "and even after long wear, never pass into nothingness, through that stage which of livid ugliness which distinguishes the commercial dyes as nuisances, even more than their short and by no means merry life."

As to colours for carpets, he wrote in his essay on textiles; "The soft gradations of tint to which Tapestry lends itself are unfit for Carpet-weaving; beauty and variety of colour must be obtained by harmonious juxtaposition of tints, bounded by judiciously chosen outlines, and the pattern should lie absolutely flat on the ground. On the whole, in designing carpets the method of contrast is the best one to employ, and blue and red, quite frankly used, with white or very light outlines on a dark ground, and black or some very dark colour on a light ground, are the main colours on which the designer should depend."

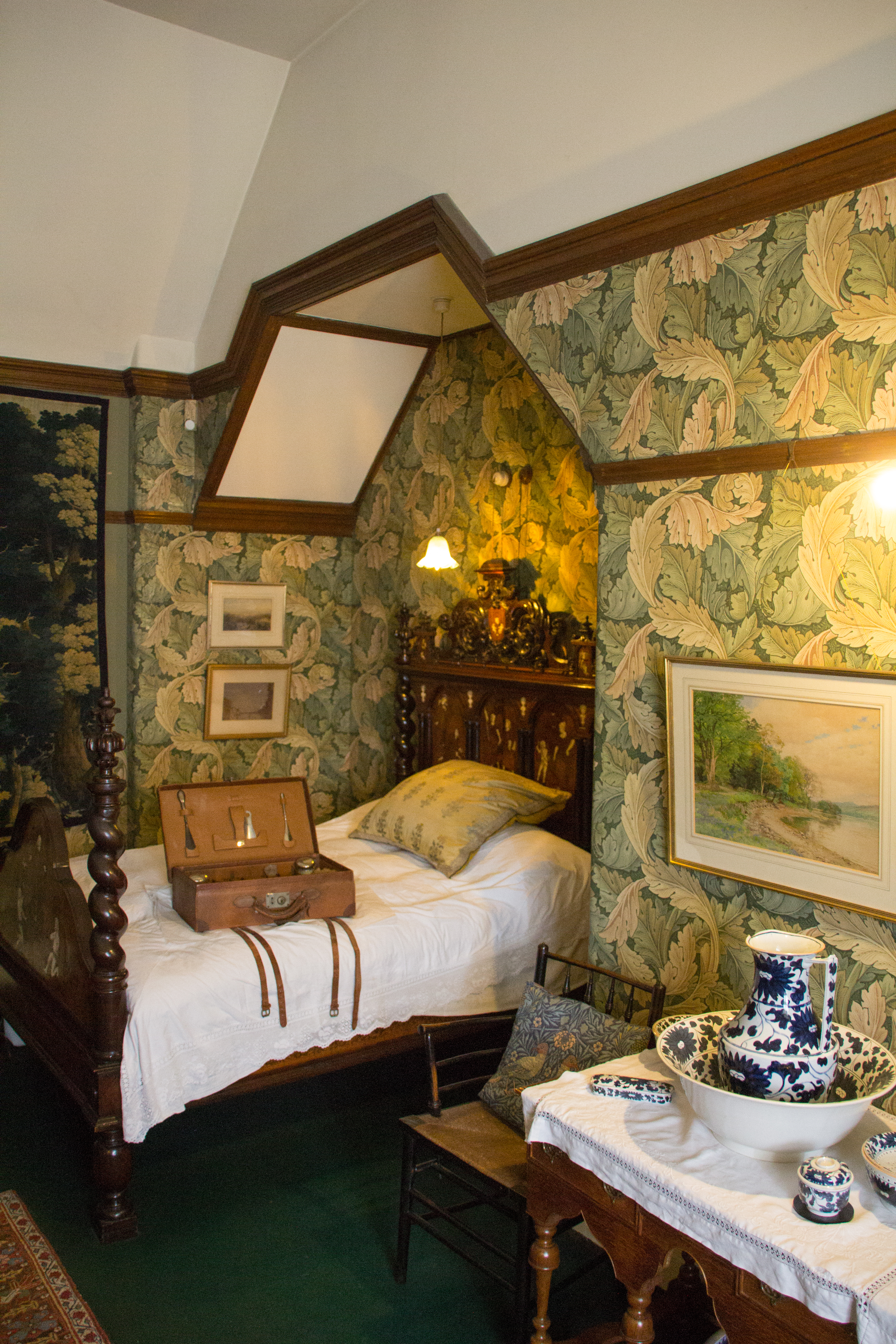
Morris wallpaper and textiles at Wightwick Manor, Staffordshire (1887–93)

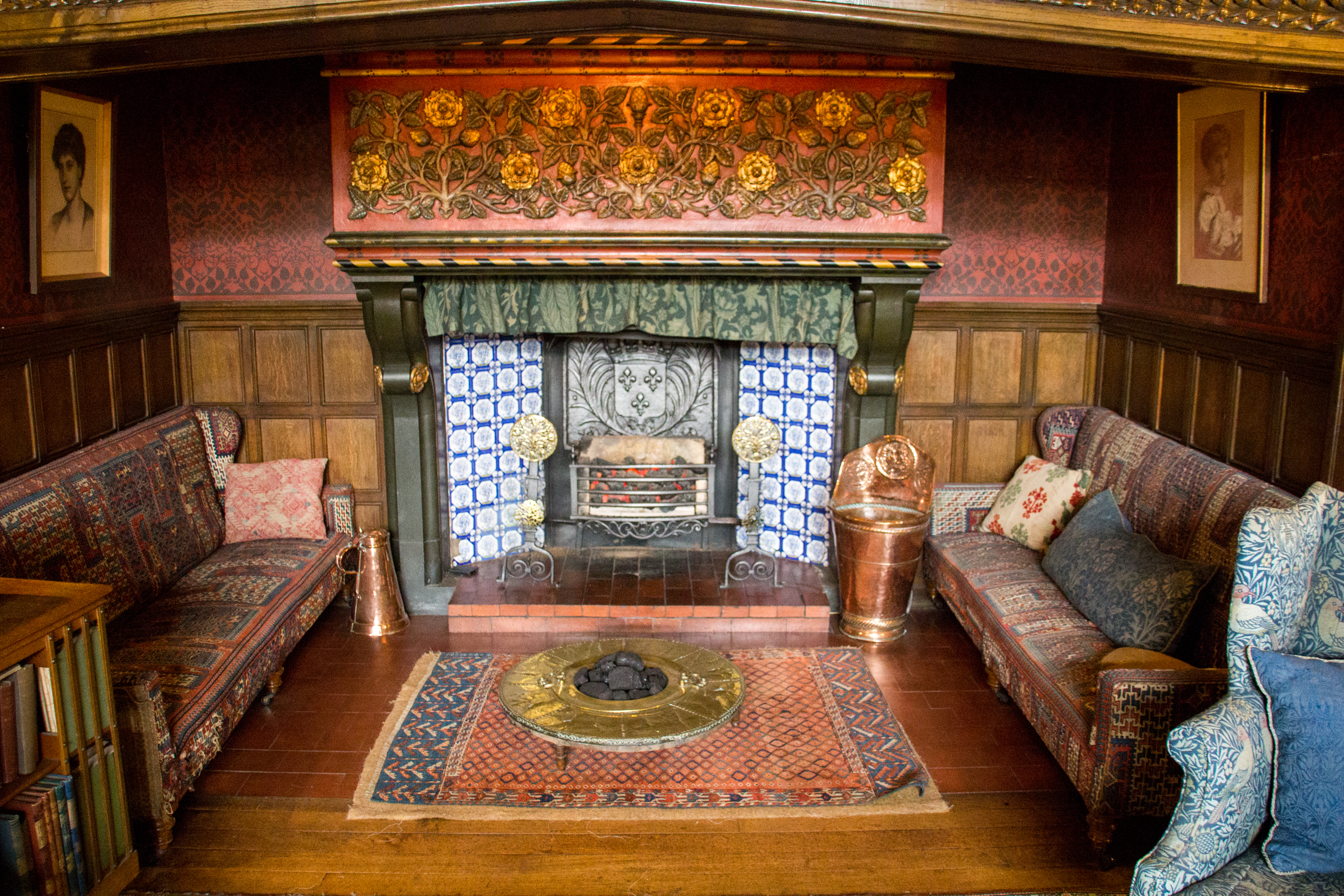
Morris wall covering, carpets and furnishing cloth at Wightwick Manor

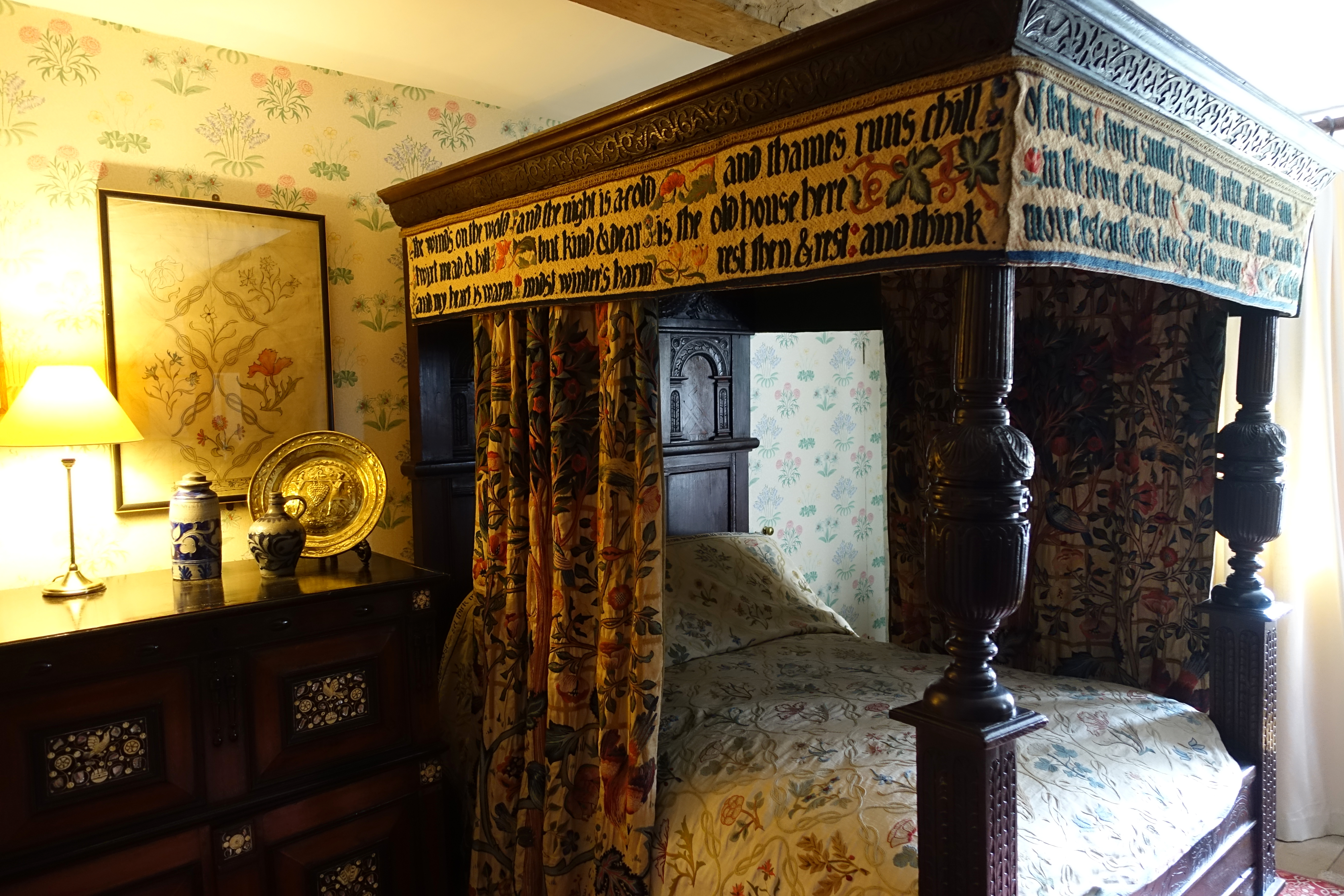
Bedroom at Kelmscott Manor with wallpaper, bed covering and curtains by May Morris and Jane Morris (1891–95)

== Legacy ==
William Morris died on 3 October 1896, but the Morris & Co. continued to design and produce textiles he had designed or planned, under the supervision of his chief assistant and Art Director John Henry Dearle. Dearle managed the company's textile works at Merton Abbey until his own death in 1932. The firm was finally dissolved in 1940, but his designs continue to be produced and marketed by other textile firms, including Sanderson and Sons, part of the Walker Greenbank wallpaper and fabrics business, which now owns the. "Morris and Co." brand name, and by the department store Liberty of London.

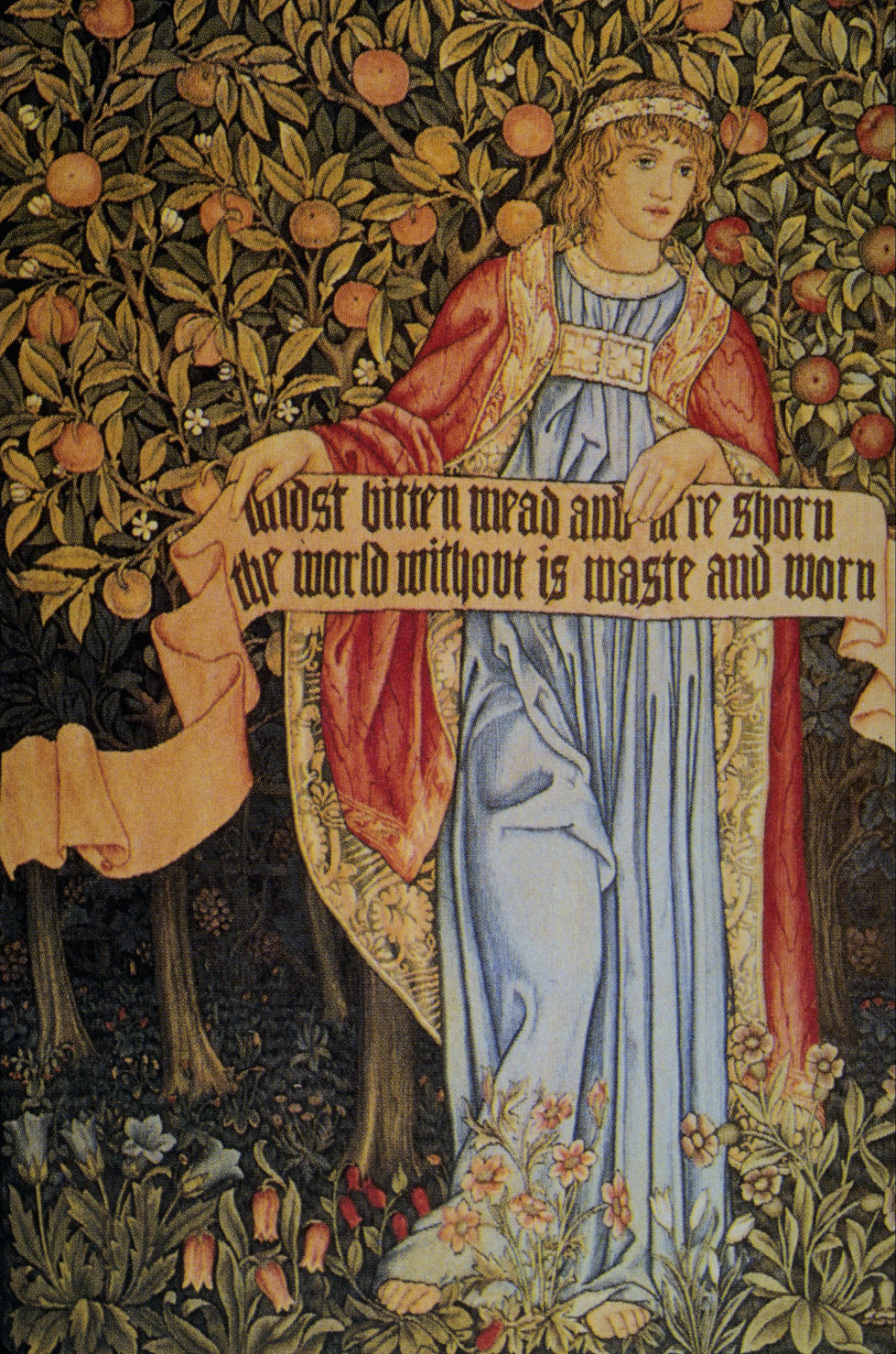
Detail of the Summer Tapestry, jointly designed by Morris and John Henry Dearle (1890).

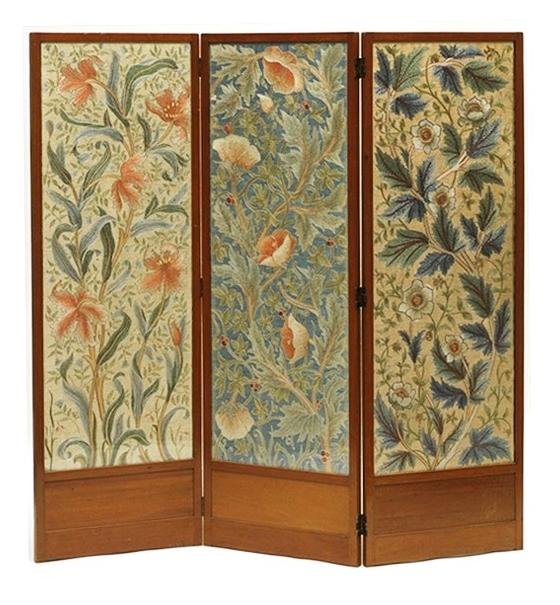
Embroidered screen by John Henry Dearle (1910), with panels of canvas embroidered with silks in darning, stem and satin stitch. The screens represent the 'Parrot Tulip', 'Large Horned Poppy' and 'Anemone' designs. (Victoria and Albert Museum)

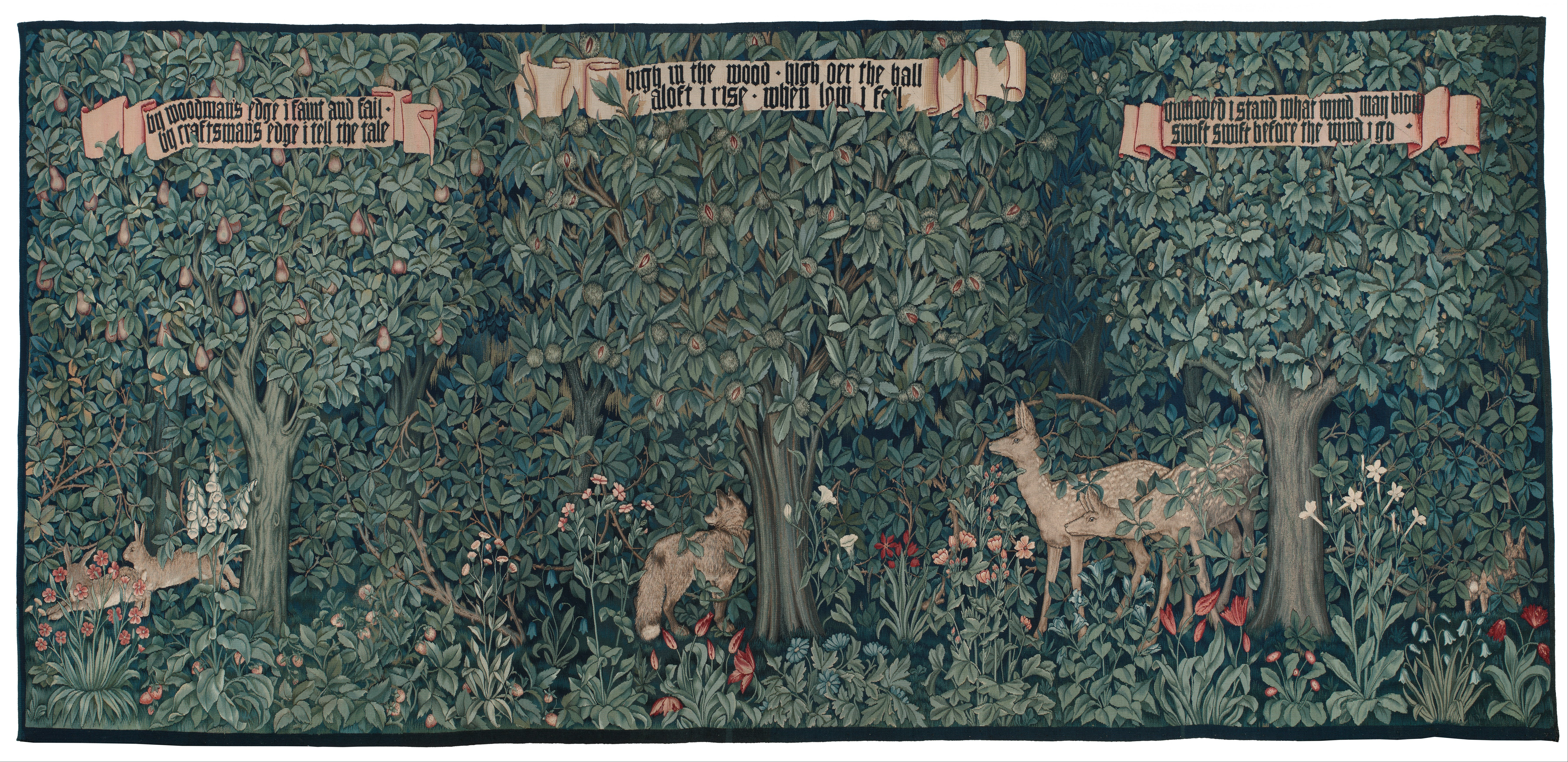
"Greenery" tapestry by John Henry Dearle for Morris and Co. (1890) (Museum of Fine Arts, Boston)

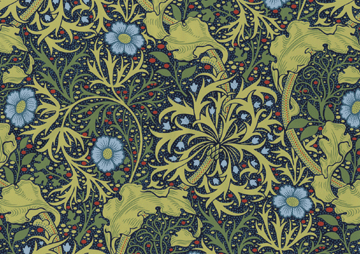
"Seaweed" wallpaper (1890), by John Henry Dearle

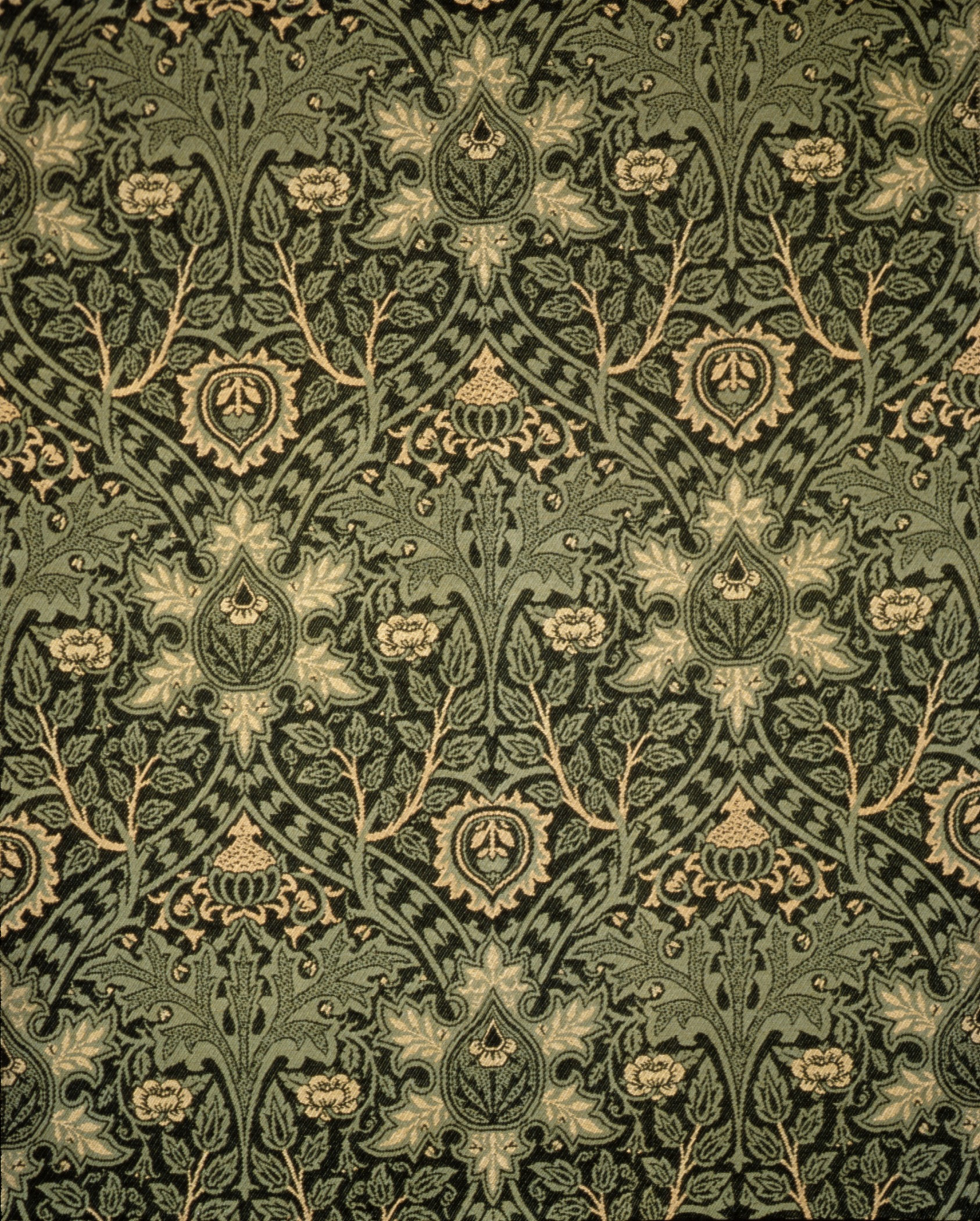
'Ispahan' carpet attributed to John Henry Dearle for Morris and Co. (circa 1888) (Los Angeles County Museum of Art)

== Bibliography ==
- Fiell, Charlotte; Fiell, Peter M. (1999). William Morris (in English, German, and French). Taschen. ISBN 978-3-8365-6162-4.
- Fiell, Charlotte; Fiell, Peter M. (2017). William Morris, 1834-1896: A Life of Art. Taschen. ISBN 9783836561631.
- Beecroft, Helen (2019). William Morris. Flame Tree Publishing. ISBN 978-1-78755-307-1.
- Fairclough, Oliver and Emmeline Leary, Textiles by William Morris and Morris & Co. 1861–1940, Birmingham Museums and Art Gallery, 1981, ISBN 0-89860-065-0
- Parry, Linda, ed., William Morris, Abrams, 1996, ISBN 0-8109-4282-8
- Parry, Linda, William Morris Textiles, New York, Viking Press, 1983, ISBN 0-670-77074-4

== See also ==
- William Morris wallpaper designs
