= John Henry Dearle =

British textile and stained-glass designer with Morris & Co. (1859–1932)

- Born: August 22, 1859; Camden Town, London, England
- Died: January 15, 1932 (aged 72)
- Other names: J. H. Dearle
- Education: William Morris
- Known for: Textile and stained-glass designer at Morris & Co.

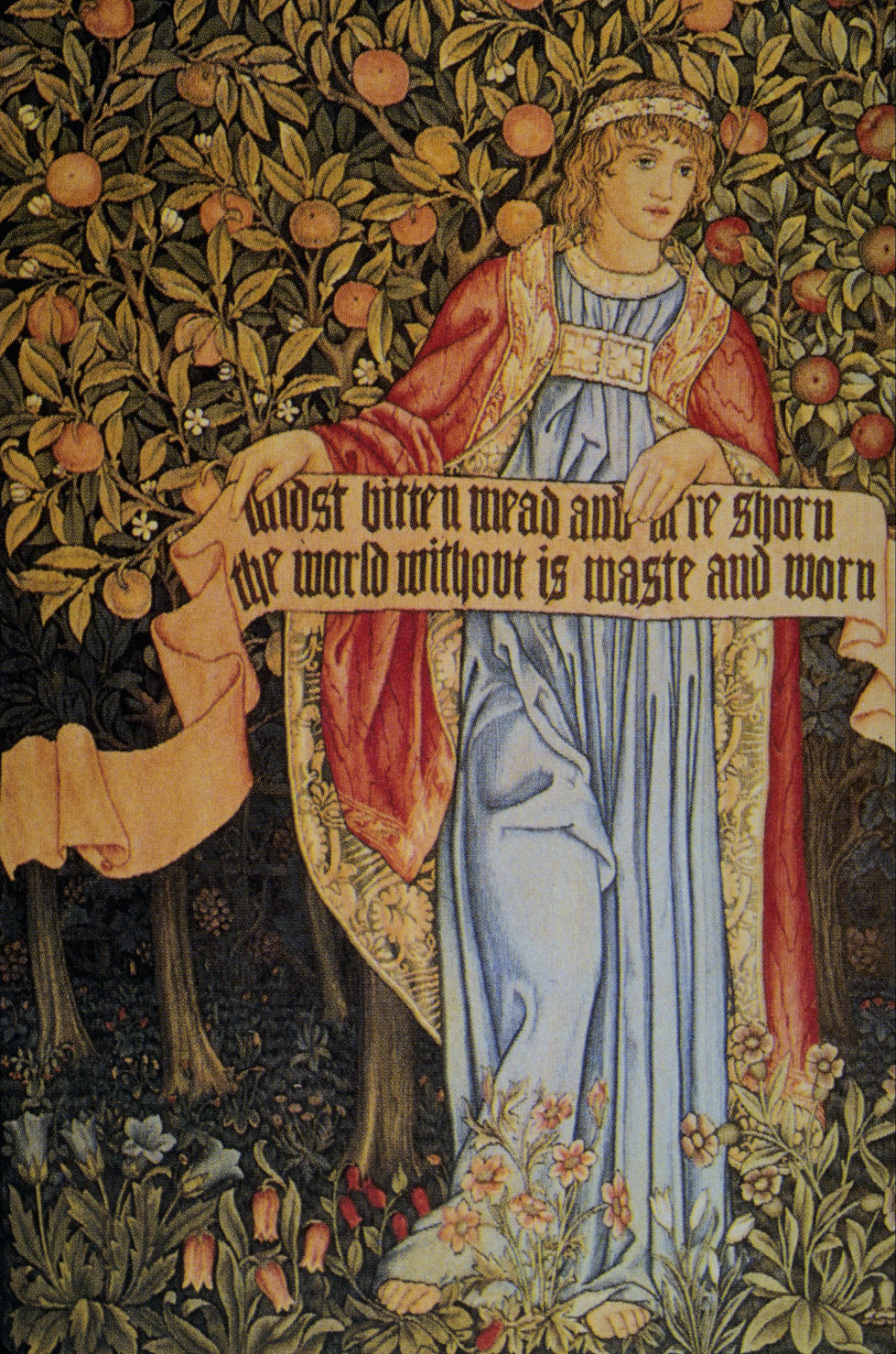
"Summer", detail from a tapestry called The Seasons or Orchard, woven by Morris & Co. in wool, silk, and mohair on a cotton ground at Merton Abbey in 1890, designed by William Morris and John Henry Dearle.

John Henry Dearle (22 August 1859 – 15 January 1932) was a British textile and stained-glass designer trained by the artist and craftsman William Morris who was much influenced by the Pre-Raphaelite Brotherhood. Dearle designed many of the later wallpapers and textiles released by Morris & Co., and contributed background and foliage patterns to tapestry designs featuring figures by Edward Burne-Jones and others. Beginning in his teens as a shop assistant and then design apprentice, Dearle rose to become Morris & Co.'s chief designer by 1890, creating designs for tapestries, embroidery, wallpapers, woven and printed textiles, stained glass, and carpets. Following Morris's death in 1896, Dearle was appointed Art Director of the firm, and became its principal stained glass designer on the death of Burne-Jones in 1898.

Morris's reputation overshadowed Dearle's work throughout Dearle's career: Dearle exhibited early patterns under Morris's name and Dearle designs continue to be sold as Morris patterns. Critical assessment of Dearle's work then underwent a significant change during the final decades of the twentieth century, recognizing Dearle's mature work as having a unique artistic vision of its own. Dearle always remained close to Morris's aesthetic, but from the 1890s onward he incorporated a distinctive set of Persian and Turkish influences.

== Career ==
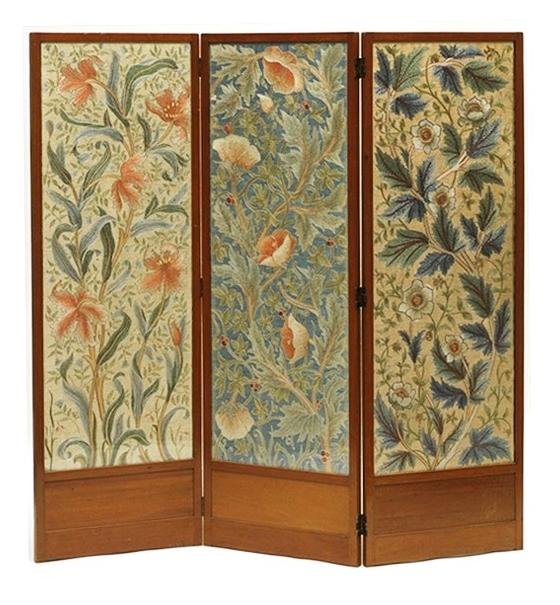
Screen with embroidered panels, 1885-1910, designed by John Henry Dearle V&A Museum no. CIRC.848-1956

Dearle was born in Camden Town, north London, in 1859. He began his career as an assistant in Morris & Co.'s retail showroom in Oxford Street in 1878, and then transferred to the company's glass painting workshop, where he worked mornings and studied design in the afternoons. Morris recognized Dearle's talents as a draftsman, and took him on as his tapestry apprentice. Morris had finished his first solo effort at tapestry in September 1879, and shortly thereafter Morris and Dearle set up a tapestry loom at Queen Square. Dearle executed Morris & Co.'s first figural tapestry from a design by Walter Crane in 1883. Dearle was soon responsible for the training of all tapestry apprentices in the workshop and partnered with Morris on designing details such as fabric patterns and floral backgrounds for tapestries based on figure drawings or cartoons by Burne-Jones (some of them repurposed from stained glass cartoons) and animal figures by Philip Webb.

In the late 1880s, Dearle began designing repeating patterns for wallpapers and textiles, and it is likely that his designs for large-scale embroideries also date from around this time.

From 1890, Dearle was head designer for the firm, handling interior design commissions and supervising the tapestry, weaving, and fabric-printing departments at Merton Abbey He was appointed Art Director of Morris & Co. following Morris's death in 1896. Dearle managed the company's textile works at Merton Abbey until his death in 1932.

== Designs ==
Fabric and wallpaper designs attributed to Henry Dearle include Cherwell (registered 1887), Trent (1888), Persian Brocatel (c. 1890), Daffodil (c. 1891), Compton (1896), Tulip (1895-1900), Artichoke (1897), and Persian or New Persian (1905).

Dearle also designed embroidery panels for screens and portieres in the Art Needlework style under the tutelage of May Morris, including Anemone (1895–90), and the well-known Owl and Pigeon (or Partridge) (c. 1895). Examples of the latter two designs worked on "Oak" silk damask grounds by Mrs. Battye are in the Victoria and Albert Museum.

== Critical assessment ==
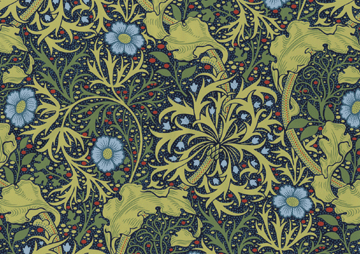
Seaweed wallpaper, 1890s

Henry Dearle's contributions to textile design were long overshadowed by the towering figure of William Morris. However, Dearle originally exhibited his designs under the Morris name rather than his own, especially in the Arts and Crafts Exhibitions and the major Morris retrospective of 1899, and even today many Dearle designs are popularly offered as "William Morris" patterns.

As late as 1981, the catalog of an exhibit of Morris & Co. textiles dismissed Dearle's style as "rarely more than a pastiche of his master's", citing as a source Lewis F. Day's assessment of 1905. But by 1989, textile historians had begun recognizing Dearle's talents as a designer. Linda Parry, a curator of textiles at the Victoria and Albert Museum, has suggested that the incorporation of Near and Middle Eastern designs in Morris & Co. textiles from the late 1880s may show the influence of Dearle's taste. Parry identifies Dearle's mature artistic voice from the 1890s in designs such as Seaweed wallpaper, Tulip woven fabric and Eden printed cotton, the latter reflecting Dearle's interest in Turkish and Persian textiles in the South Kensington Museum (now the Victoria and Albert).

== Notes ==
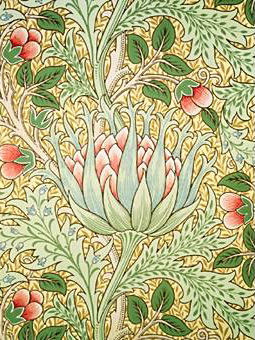
Artichoke wallpaper, c. 1897
