= Arts and Crafts movement =

Design movement (c. 1880–1920)

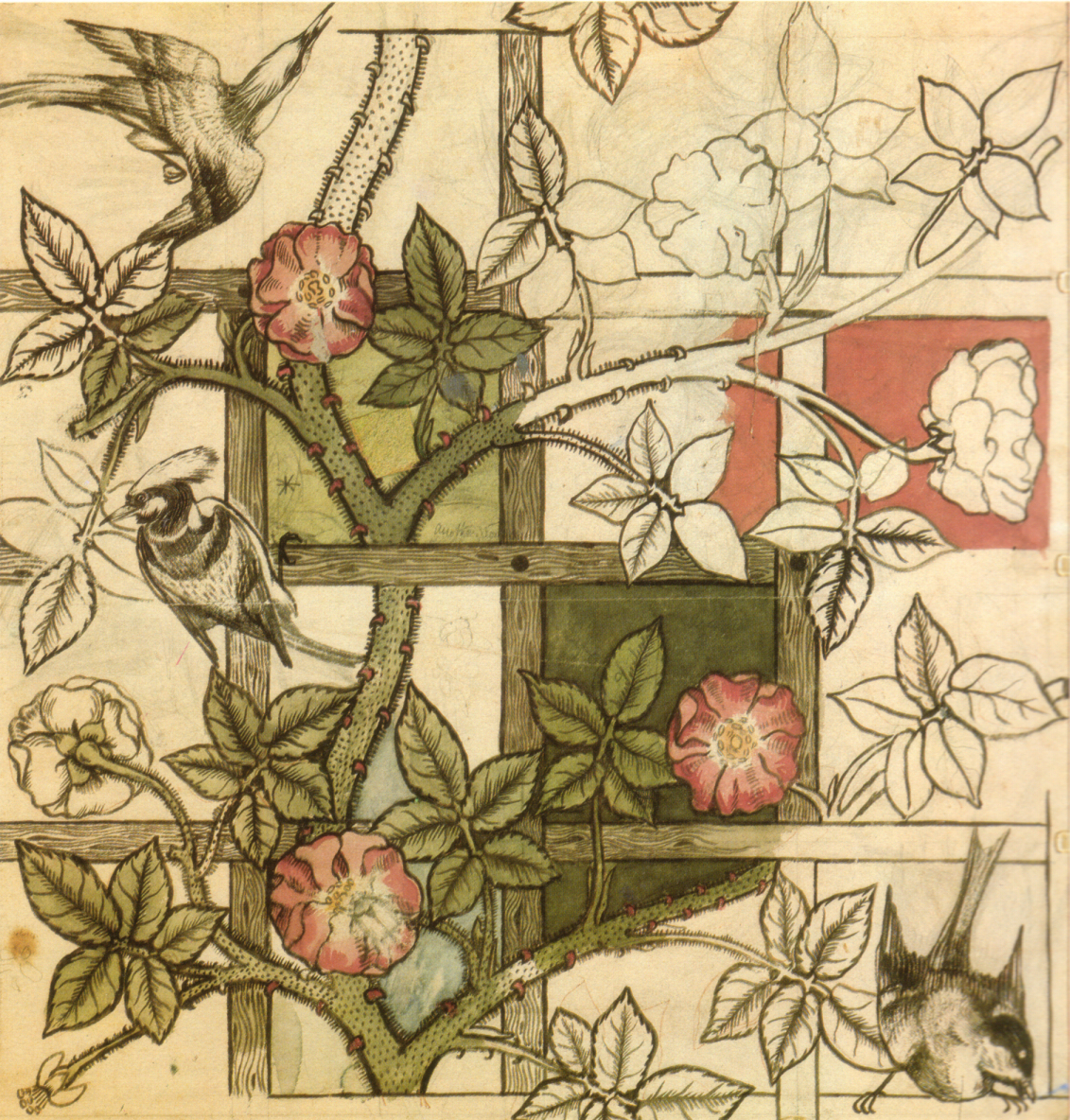
William Morris's design for Trellis wallpaper, 1862

The Arts and Crafts movement was an international trend in the decorative and fine arts that developed earliest and most fully in the British Isles and subsequently spread across the British Empire and to the rest of Europe and North America. Broadly, the beginning of the movement can be dated to the 1880s, with the term itself first used in 1887, and by about 1920 it can be considered as over in the UK, although the term continued in spurious use for various popular elements in design.

Initiated in reaction against the perceived impoverishment of the decorative arts and the conditions in which they were produced, the movement flourished in Europe and North America between about 1880 and 1920. Some consider that it is the root of the Modern Style, a British expression of what later came to be called the Art Nouveau movement. Others regard it as the incarnation of Art Nouveau in England. Others consider Art and Crafts to be in opposition to Art Nouveau. Arts and Crafts indeed criticised Art Nouveau for its use of industrial materials such as iron.

In Japan, it emerged in the 1920s as the Mingei movement, promoting traditional craftsmanship.

The term was first used by T. J. Cobden-Sanderson at a meeting of the Arts and Crafts Exhibition Society in 1887, although the principles and style on which it was based had been developing in England for at least 20 years. It was inspired by the ideas of historian Thomas Carlyle, art critic John Ruskin, and designer William Morris. In Scotland, it is associated with key figures such as Charles Rennie Mackintosh. Viollet-le-Duc's books on nature and Gothic art also play an essential part in the aesthetics of the Arts and Crafts movement.

== Origins and influences ==
=== Design reform ===
The Arts and Crafts movement emerged from the attempt to reform design and decoration in mid-19th-century Britain. It was a reaction against a perceived decline in standards that the reformers associated with machinery and factory production. Their critique was sharpened by the items that they saw in Great Exhibition of 1851, which they considered to be excessively ornate, artificial, and ignorant of the qualities of the materials used. Art historian Nikolaus Pevsner writes that the exhibits showed "ignorance of that basic need in creating patterns, the integrity of the surface", as well as displaying "vulgarity in detail".

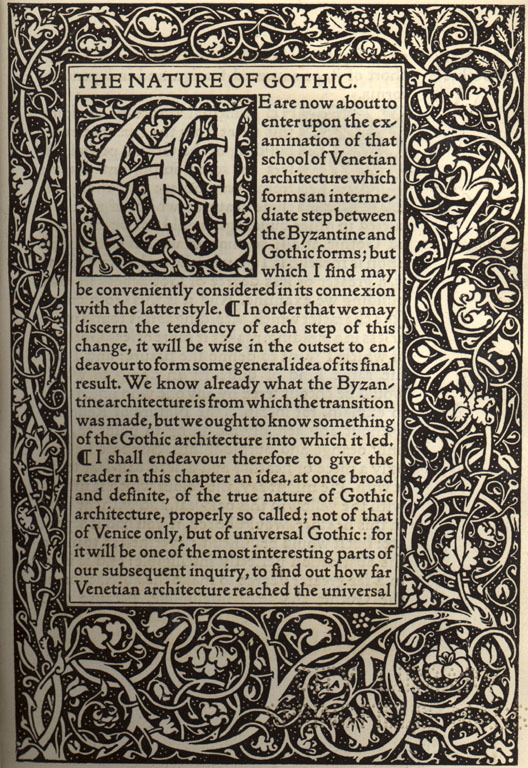
The Nature of Gothic by John Ruskin, printed by William Morris at the Kelmscott Press in 1892 in his Golden Type inspired by the 15th-century printer Nicolas Jenson. This chapter from The Stones of Venice was a sort of manifesto for the Arts and Crafts movement.

Design reform began with Exhibition organisers Henry Cole (1808–1882), Owen Jones (1809–1874), Matthew Digby Wyatt (1820–1877), and Richard Redgrave (1804–1888), all of whom deprecated excessive ornament and impractical or badly-made things. The organisers were "unanimous in their condemnation of the exhibits." Owen Jones, for example, complained that "the architect, the upholsterer, the paper-stainer, the weaver, the calico-printer, and the potter" produced "novelty without beauty, or beauty without intelligence." From these criticisms of manufactured goods emerged several publications that set out what the writers considered to be the correct principles of design. Richard Redgrave's Supplementary Report on Design (1852) analysed the principles of design and ornament and pleaded for "more logic in the application of decoration."

Other works followed in a similar vein, such as Wyatt's Industrial Arts of the Nineteenth Century (1853), Gottfried Semper's Wissenschaft, Industrie und Kunst ("Science, Industry and Art") (1852), Ralph Wornum's Analysis of Ornament (1856), Redgrave's Manual of Design (1876), and Jones's Grammar of Ornament (1856). The Grammar of Ornament was particularly influential, liberally distributed as a student prize and running into nine reprints by 1910.

Jones declared that ornament "must be secondary to the thing decorated", that there must be "fitness in the ornament to the thing ornamented", and that wallpapers and carpets must not have any patterns "suggestive of anything but a level or plain". A fabric or wallpaper in the Great Exhibition might be decorated with a natural motif made to look as real as possible, whereas these writers advocated flat and simplified natural motifs. Redgrave insisted that "style" demanded sound construction before ornamentation, and a proper awareness of the quality of materials used. "Utility must have precedence over ornamentation."

However, the design reformers of the mid-19th century did not go as far as the designers of the Arts and Crafts movement. They were more concerned with ornamentation than construction, they had an incomplete understanding of methods of manufacture, and they did not criticise industrial methods as such. By contrast, the Arts and Crafts movement was as much a movement of social reform as design reform, and its leading practitioners did not separate the two.

=== A. W. N. Pugin ===
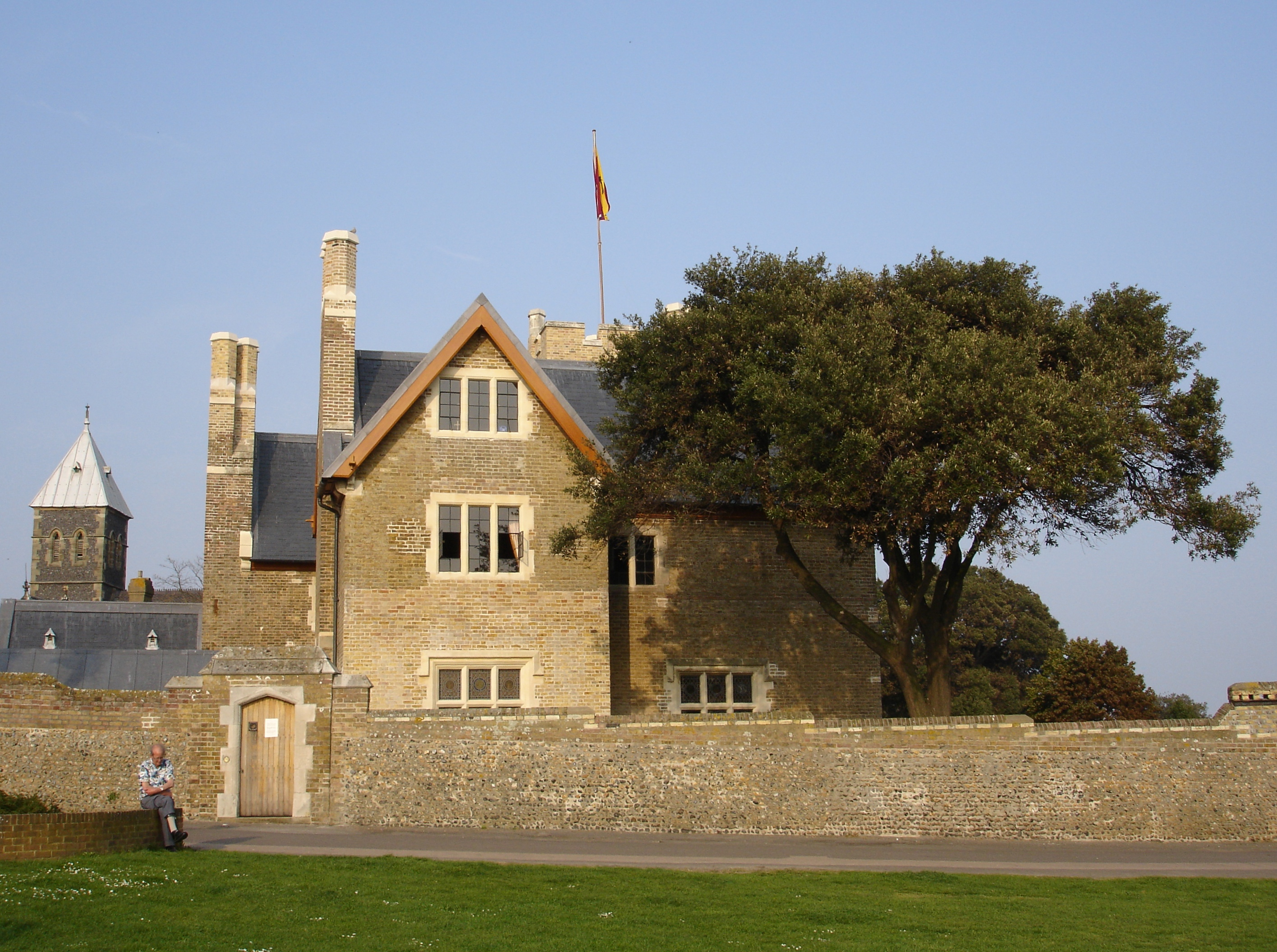
Pugin's house "The Grange" in Ramsgate, from 1843. Its simplified Gothic Revival style, adapted to domestic building, helped shape the architecture of the Arts and Crafts movement.

Some of the ideas of the movement were anticipated by Augustus Pugin (1812–1852), a leader in the Gothic Revival in architecture. For example, he advocated truth to material, structure, and function, as did the Arts and Crafts artists. Pugin articulated the tendency of social critics to compare the faults of modern society with the Middle Ages, such as the sprawling growth of cities and the treatment of the poor – a tendency that became routine with Ruskin, Morris, and the Arts and Crafts movement. His book Contrasts (1836) drew examples of bad modern buildings and town planning in contrast with good medieval examples, and his biographer Rosemary Hill notes that he "reached conclusions, almost in passing, about the importance of craftsmanship and tradition in architecture that it would take the rest of the century and the combined efforts of Ruskin and Morris to work out in detail." She describes the spare furnishings which he specified for a building in 1841, "rush chairs, oak tables", as "the Arts and Crafts interior in embryo."

=== John Ruskin ===
The Arts and Crafts philosophy was derived in large measure from John Ruskin's social criticism, deeply influenced by the work of Thomas Carlyle. Ruskin related the moral and social health of a nation to the qualities of its architecture and to the nature of its work. Ruskin considered the sort of mechanised production and division of labour that had been created in the Industrial Revolution to be "servile labour", and he thought that a healthy and moral society required independent workers who designed the things that they made. He believed factory-made works to be "dishonest," and that handwork and craftsmanship merged dignity with labour.

On the artistic side Ruskin was influenced by his contemporary Viollet-le-Duc whom he taught to all of his pupils. In a letter to one of his pupils Ruskin writes: "There is only one book of architecture of any value and that contains every thing, rightly, Monsieur Viollet-le-Duc's Dictionary. Every architect must learn French". According to some, Ruskin's influence on Arts and Crafts was supplanted in 1860 by that of Viollet-le-Duc.

His followers favoured craft production over industrial manufacture and were concerned about the loss of traditional skills, but they were more troubled by the effects of the factory system than by machinery itself. William Morris's idea of "handicraft" was essentially work without any division of labour rather than work without any sort of machinery. Morris admired Ruskin's The Seven Lamps of Architecture and The Stones of Venice and had read Modern Painters, but he did not share Ruskin's admiration for J. M. W. Turner and his writings on art indicate a lack of interest in easel painting as such. On his side, Ruskin dissented firmly from the idea that became Arts-and-Crafts orthodoxy, that decoration should be flat and should not represent three-dimensional forms.

=== William Morris ===
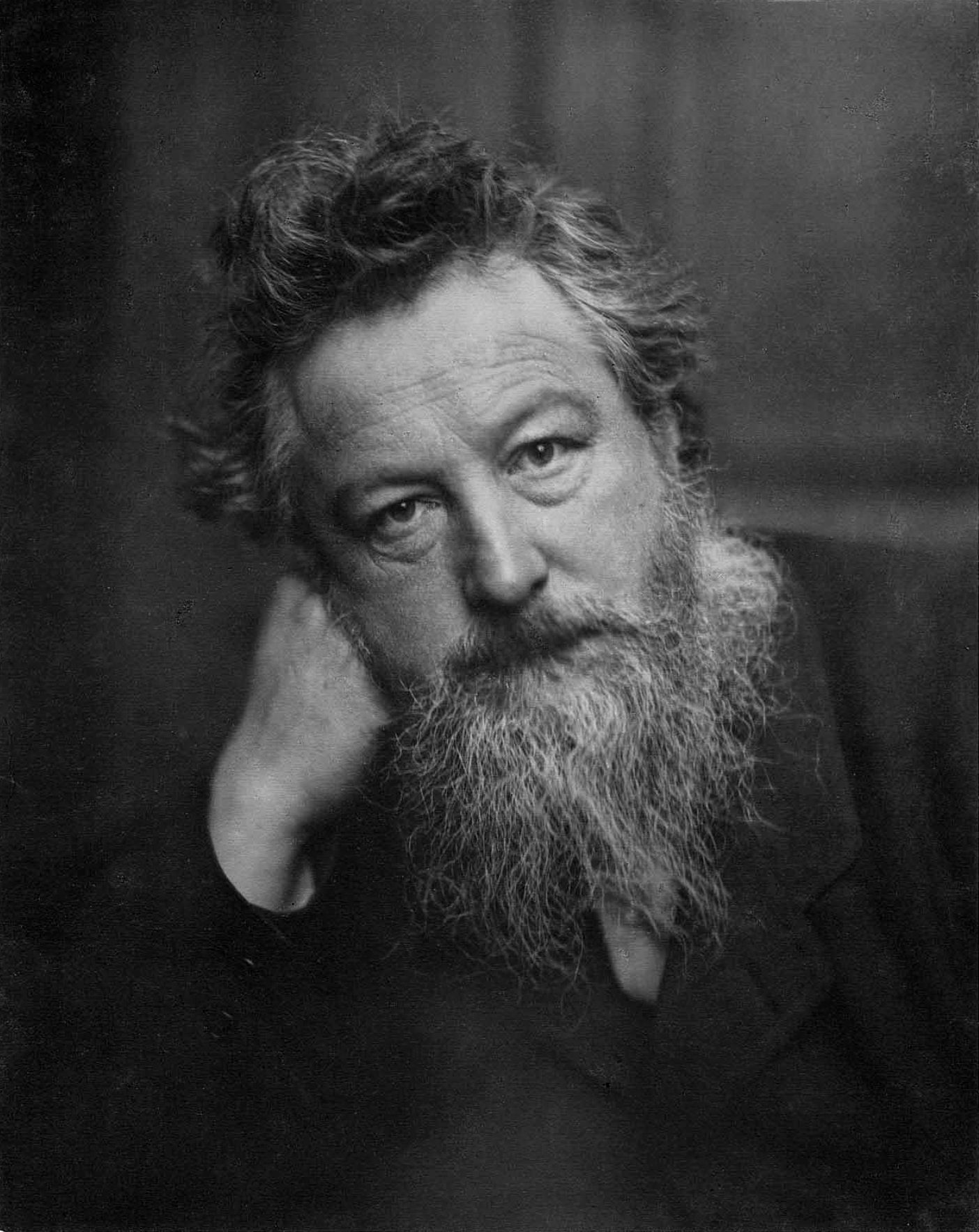
William Morris, a designer and thinker who was a key influence on the Arts and Crafts movement

William Morris (1834–1896) was the towering figure in late 19th-century design and the main influence on the Arts and Crafts movement. The aesthetic and social vision of the movement grew out of ideas that he developed in the 1850s with the Birmingham Set – a group of students at the University of Oxford including Edward Burne-Jones, who combined a love of Romantic literature with a commitment to social reform. John William Mackail notes that, for the Set, "Carlyle's Past and Present stood alongside of [Ruskin's] Modern Painters as inspired and absolute truth." The medievalism of Malory's Morte d'Arthur set the standard for their early style. In Burne-Jones' words, they intended to "wage Holy warfare against the age".

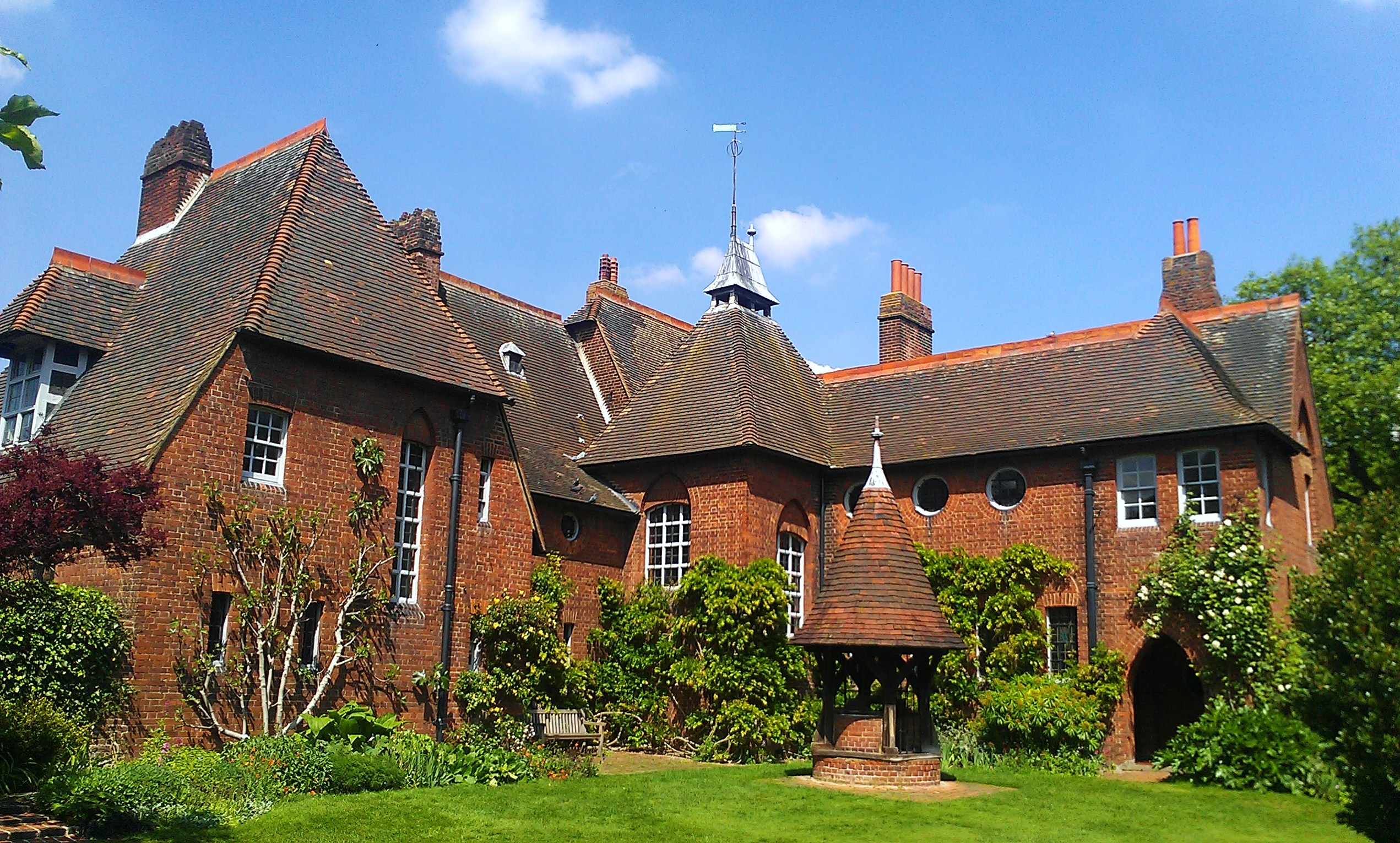
William Morris's Red House in Bexleyheath, designed by Philip Webb and completed in 1860; one of the most significant buildings of the Arts and Crafts movement

Morris began experimenting with various crafts and designing furniture and interiors. He was personally involved in manufacture as well as design, which was the hallmark of the Arts and Crafts movement. Ruskin had argued that the separation of the intellectual act of design from the manual act of physical creation was both socially and aesthetically damaging. Morris further developed this idea, insisting that no work should be carried out in his workshops before he had personally mastered the appropriate techniques and materials, arguing that "without dignified, creative human occupation people became disconnected from life".

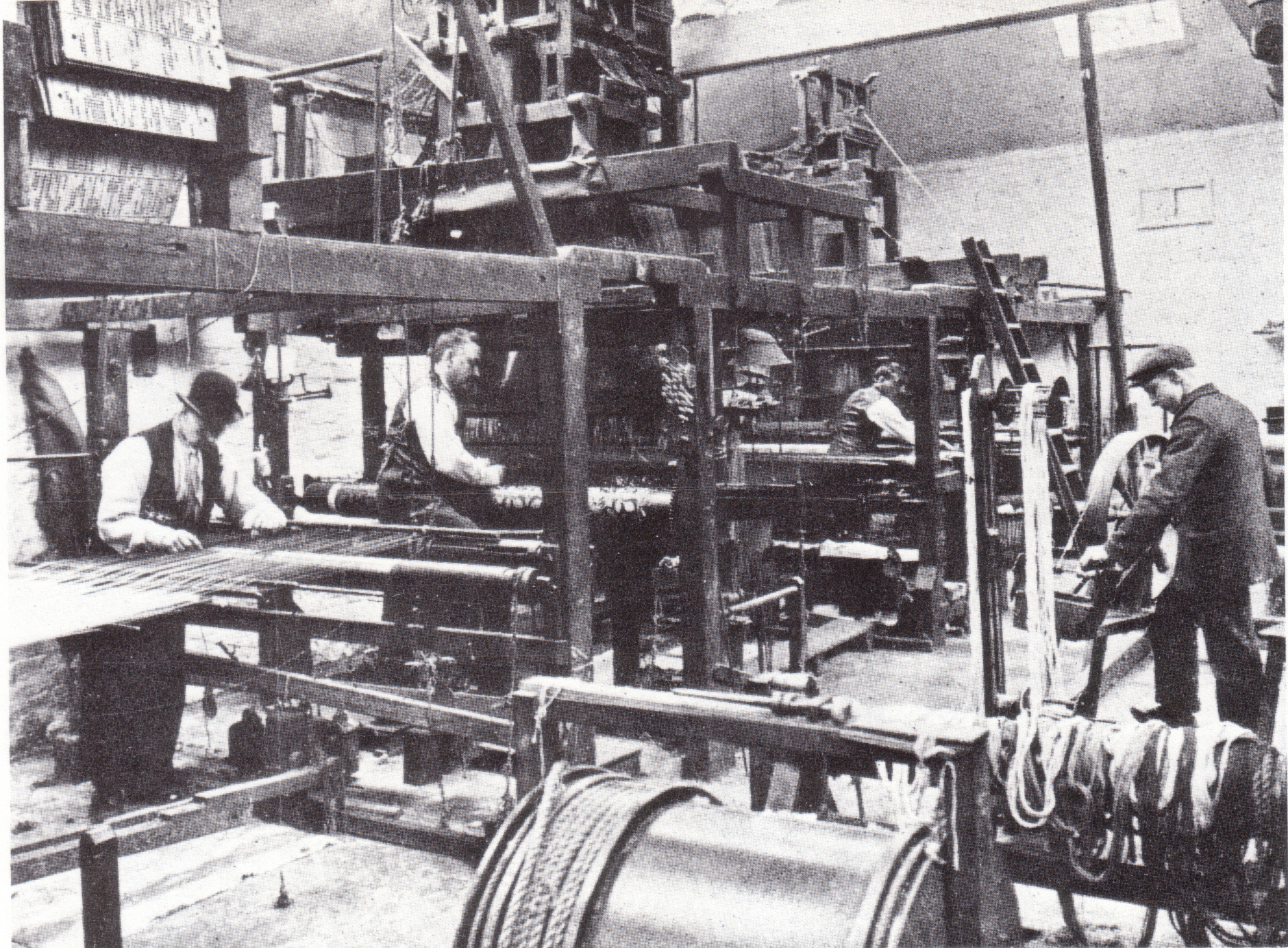
The weaving shed in Morris & Co's factory, the Merton Abbey Works, which opened in the 1880s

In 1861, Morris began making furniture and decorative objects commercially, modelling his designs on medieval styles and using bold forms and strong colours. His patterns were based on flora and fauna, and his products were inspired by the vernacular or domestic traditions of the British countryside. Some were deliberately left unfinished in order to display the beauty of the materials and the work of the craftsman, thus creating a rustic appearance. Morris strove to unite all the arts within the decoration of the home, emphasising nature and simplicity of form.

== Social and design principles ==
Unlike their counterparts in the United States, most Arts and Crafts practitioners in Britain had strong, slightly incoherent, negative feelings about machinery. They thought of "the craftsman" as free, creative, and working with his hands, "the machine" as soulless, repetitive, and inhuman. These contrasting images derive in part from John Ruskin's (1819–1900) The Stones of Venice, an architectural history of Venice that contains a powerful denunciation of modern industrialism to which Arts and Crafts designers returned again and again. Distrust for the machine lay behind the many little workshops that turned their backs on the industrial world around 1900, using preindustrial techniques to create what they called "crafts."

— Alan Crawford, "W. A. S. Benson, Machinery, and the Arts and Crafts Movement in Britain", The Journal of Decorative and Propaganda Arts (2002)

=== Critique of industry ===
William Morris shared Ruskin's critique of industrial society and at one time or another attacked the modern factory, the use of machinery, the division of labour, capitalism and the loss of traditional craft methods. But his attitude to machinery was inconsistent. He said at one point that production by machinery was "altogether an evil", but at others times, he was willing to commission work from manufacturers who were able to meet his standards with the aid of machines. Morris said that in a "true society", where neither luxuries nor cheap trash were made, machinery could be improved and used to reduce the hours of labour. The cultural historian Fiona McCarthy said of Morris that "unlike later zealots like Gandhi, William Morris had no practical objections to the use of machinery per se so long as the machines produced the quality he needed."

Morris insisted that the artist should be a craftsman-designer working by hand and advocated a society of free craftspeople, such as he believed had existed during the Middle Ages. "Because craftsmen took pleasure in their work", he wrote, "the Middle Ages was a period of greatness in the art of the common people. ... The treasures in our museums now are only the common utensils used in households of that age, when hundreds of medieval churches – each one a masterpiece – were built by unsophisticated peasants." Medieval art was the model for much of Arts and Crafts design, and medieval life, literature and building was idealised by the movement.

Morris's followers also had differing views about machinery and the factory system. For example, C. R. Ashbee, a central figure in the Arts and Crafts movement, said in 1888, that, "We do not reject the machine, we welcome it. But we would desire to see it mastered." After unsuccessfully pitting his Guild and School of Handicraft guild against modern methods of manufacture, he acknowledged that "Modern civilisation rests on machinery", but he continued to criticise the deleterious effects of what he called "mechanism", saying that "the production of certain mechanical commodities is as bad for the national health as is the production of slave-grown cane or child-sweated wares." William Arthur Smith Benson, on the other hand, had no qualms about adapting the Arts and Crafts style to metalwork produced under industrial conditions (see Crawford quotation above).

Morris and his followers believed the division of labour on which modern industry depended was undesirable, but the extent to which every design should be carried out by the designer was a matter for debate and disagreement. Not all Arts and Crafts artists carried out every stage in the making of goods themselves, and it was only in the 20th century that that became essential to the definition of craftsmanship. Although Morris was famous for getting hands-on experience himself of many crafts (including weaving, dyeing, printing, calligraphy and embroidery), he did not regard the separation of designer and executant in his factory as problematic. Walter Crane, a close political associate of Morris's, took an unsympathetic view of the division of labour on both moral and artistic grounds, and strongly advocated that designing and making should come from the same hand. Lewis Foreman Day, a friend and contemporary of Crane's, as unstinting as Crane in his admiration of Morris, disagreed strongly with Crane. He thought that the separation of design and execution was not only inevitable in the modern world, but also that only that sort of specialisation allowed the best in design and the best in making.

Few of the founders of the Arts and Crafts Exhibition Society insisted that the designer should also be the maker, although they considered it important that the maker should be credited, which was the practice in the catalogues of their exhibitions. Peter Floud, writing in the 1950s, said that "The founders of the Society ... never executed their own designs, but invariably turned them over to commercial firms." The idea that the designer should be the maker and the maker the designer derived "not from Morris or early Arts and Crafts teaching, but rather from the second-generation elaboration doctrine worked out in the first decade of [the 20th] century by men such as W. R. Lethaby".

=== Socialism ===
Many of the Arts and Crafts movement designers were socialists, including Morris, T. J. Cobden Sanderson, Walter Crane, C. R. Ashbee, Philip Webb, Charles Faulkner, and A. H. Mackmurdo. In the early 1880s, Morris was spending more of his time on promoting socialism than on designing and making. Ashbee established a community of craftsmen called the Guild of Handicraft in east London, later moving to Chipping Campden. Those adherents who were not socialists, such as Alfred Hoare Powell, advocated a more humane and personal relationship between employer and employee. Lewis Foreman Day was another successful and influential Arts and Crafts designer who was not a socialist, despite his long friendship with Crane.

=== Association with other reform movements ===
In Britain, the movement was associated with dress reform, ruralism, the garden city movement and the folk-song revival. All were linked, in some degree, by the ideal of "the Simple Life". In continental Europe the movement was associated with the preservation of national traditions in building, the applied arts, domestic design and costume.

== Development ==
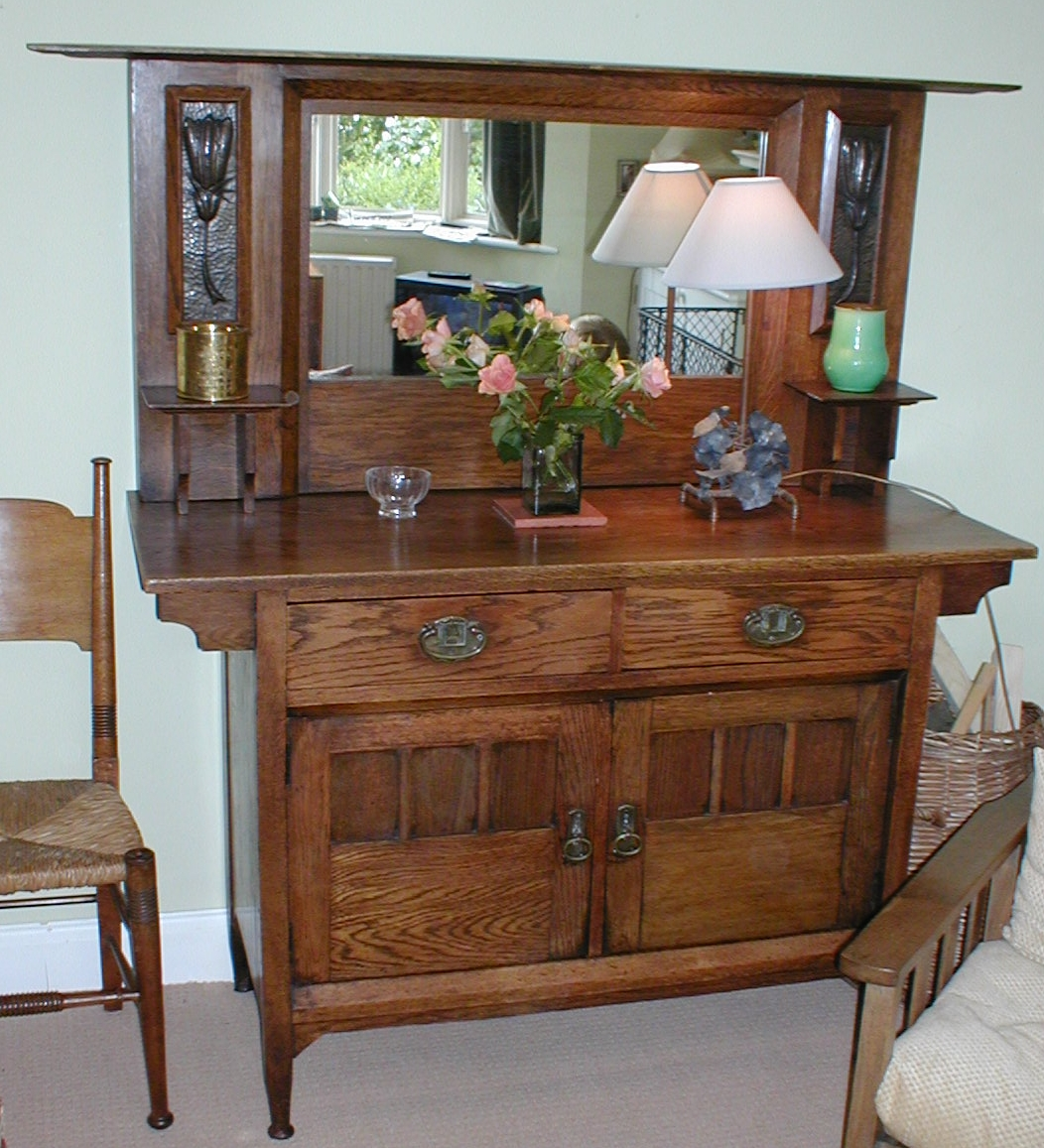
Sideboard by Harris Lebus, c. 1905, with other Arts and Crafts furniture

Morris's designs quickly became popular, attracting interest when his company's work was exhibited at the 1862 International Exhibition in London. Much of this work is directly inspired from the Dictionnaire of Viollet-le-Duc. Most of Morris & Co's early work was for churches and Morris won important interior design commissions at St James's Palace and the South Kensington Museum (now the Victoria and Albert Museum). Later his work became popular with the middle and upper classes, despite his wish to create a democratic art, and by the end of the 19th century, Arts and Crafts design in houses and domestic interiors was the dominant style in Britain, copied in products made by conventional industrial methods.

The spread of Arts and Crafts ideas during the late 19th and early 20th centuries resulted in the establishment of many associations and craft communities, although Morris had little to do with them because of his preoccupation with socialism at the time. A hundred and thirty Arts and Crafts organisations were formed in Britain, most between 1895 and 1905.

In 1881, Eglantyne Louisa Jebb, Mary Fraser Tytler and others initiated the Home Arts and Industries Association to encourage the working classes, especially those in rural areas, to take up handicrafts under supervision, not for profit, but in order to provide them with useful occupations and to improve their taste. By 1889 it had 450 classes, 1,000 teachers and 5,000 students.

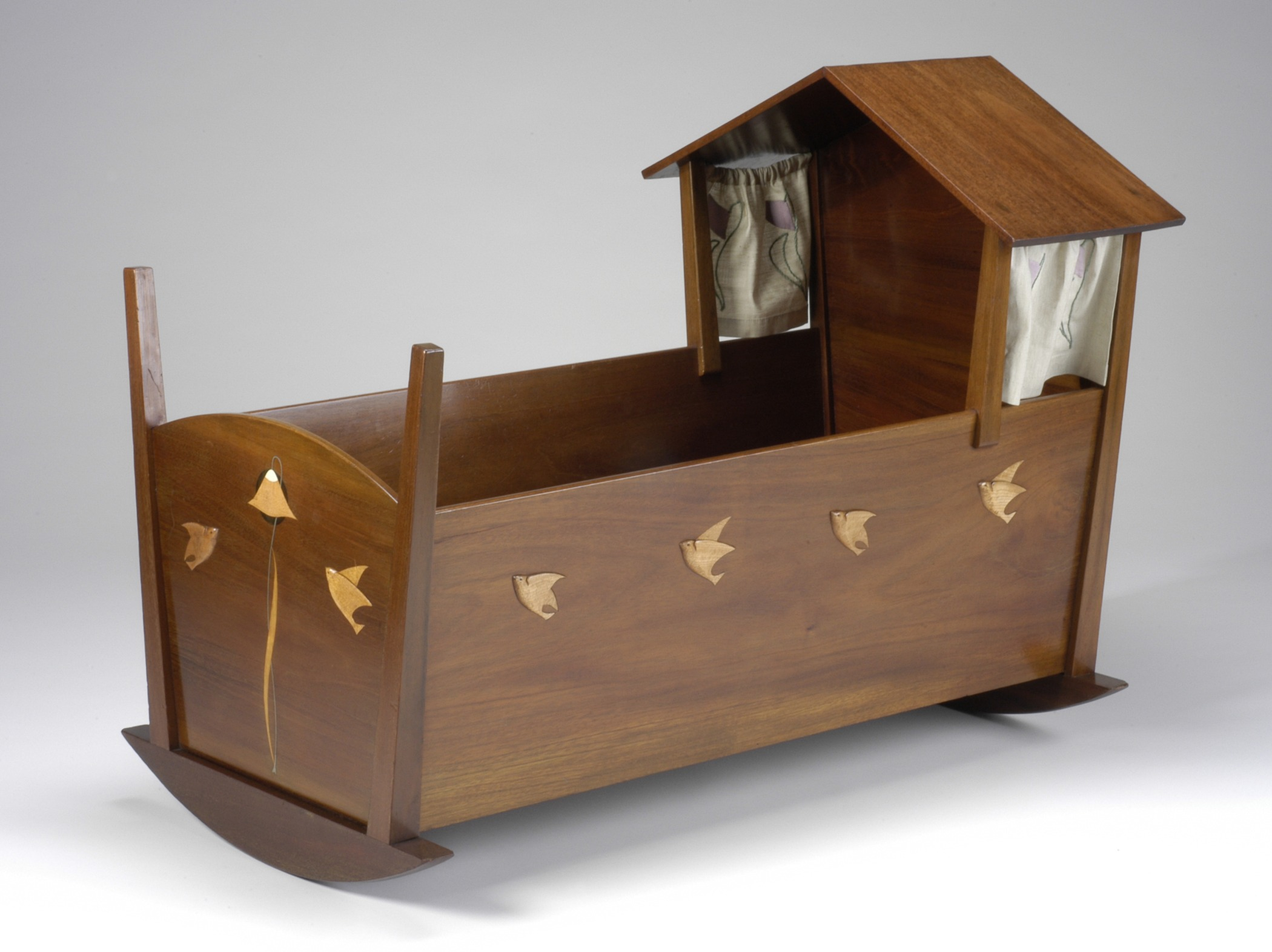
Cradle by Baillie Scott, c. 1897

In 1882, the architect A. H. Mackmurdo formed the Century Guild, a partnership of designers including Selwyn Image, Herbert Horne, Clement Heaton and Benjamin Creswick.

In 1884, the Art Workers Guild was initiated by five young architects, William Lethaby, Edward Prior, Ernest Newton, Mervyn Macartney and Gerald C. Horsley, with the goal of bringing together fine and applied arts and raising the status of the latter. It was directed originally by George Blackall Simonds. By 1890 the Guild had 150 members, representing the increasing number of practitioners of the Arts and Crafts style. It still exists.

The London department store Liberty, founded in 1875, was a prominent retailer of goods in the style and of the "artistic dress" favoured by followers of the Arts and Crafts movement.

In 1887, the Arts and Crafts Exhibition Society, which gave its name to the movement, was formed with Walter Crane as president, holding its first exhibition in the New Gallery, London, in November 1888. It was the first show of contemporary decorative arts in London since the Grosvenor Gallery's Winter Exhibition of 1881. Morris & Co. was well represented in the exhibition with furniture, fabrics, carpets and embroideries. Edward Burne-Jones observed, "here for the first time one can measure a bit the change that has happened in the last twenty years". The society still exists as the Society of Designer Craftsmen.

In 1888, C. R. Ashbee, a major late practitioner of the style in England, founded the Guild and School of Handicraft in the East End of London. The guild was a craft co-operative modelled on the medieval guilds and intended to give working men satisfaction in their craftsmanship. Skilled craftsmen, working on the principles of Ruskin and Morris, were to produce hand-crafted goods and manage a school for apprentices. The idea was greeted with enthusiasm by almost everyone except Morris, who was by now involved with promoting socialism and thought Ashbee's scheme trivial. From 1888 to 1902 the guild prospered, employing about 50 men. In 1902 Ashbee relocated the guild out of London to begin an experimental community in Chipping Campden in the Cotswolds. The guild's work is characterised by plain surfaces of hammered silver, flowing wirework and coloured stones in simple settings. Ashbee designed jewellery and silver tableware. The guild flourished at Chipping Camden but did not prosper and was liquidated in 1908. Some craftsmen stayed, contributing to the tradition of modern craftsmanship in the area.

C.F.A. Voysey (1857–1941) was an Arts and Crafts architect who also designed fabrics, tiles, ceramics, furniture and metalwork. His style combined simplicity with sophistication. His wallpapers and textiles, featuring stylised bird and plant forms in bold outlines with flat colours, were used widely.

Morris's thought influenced the distributism of G. K. Chesterton and Hilaire Belloc.

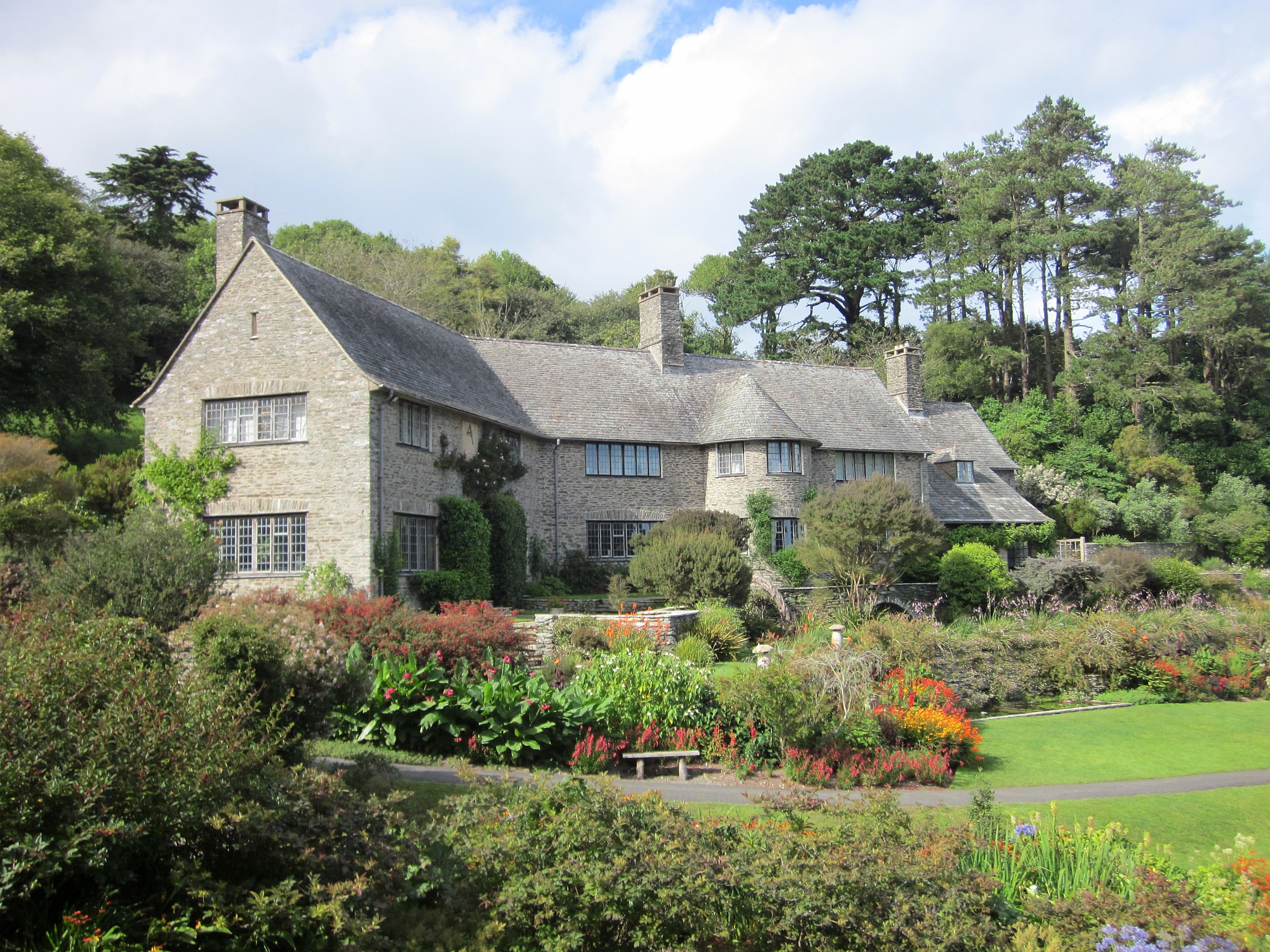
Coleton Fishacre was designed in 1925 as a holiday home in Kingswear, Devon, England, in the Arts and Crafts tradition.

By the end of the 19th century, Arts and Crafts ideals had influenced architecture, painting, sculpture, graphics, illustration, book making and photography, domestic design and the decorative arts, including furniture and woodwork, stained glass, leatherwork, lacemaking, embroidery, rug making and weaving, jewellery and metalwork, enameling and ceramics. By 1910, there was a fashion for "Arts and Crafts" and all things hand-made. There was a proliferation of amateur handicrafts of variable quality and of incompetent imitators who caused the public to regard Arts and Crafts as "something less, instead of more, competent and fit for purpose than an ordinary mass produced article."

The Arts and Crafts Exhibition Society held eleven exhibitions between 1888 and 1916. By the outbreak of war in 1914 it was in decline and faced a crisis. Its 1912 exhibition had been a financial failure. While designers in continental Europe were making innovations in design and alliances with industry through initiatives such as the Deutsche Werkbund and new initiatives were being taken in Britain by the Omega Workshops and the Design in Industries Association, the Arts and Crafts Exhibition Society, now under the control of an old guard, was withdrawing from commerce and collaboration with manufacturers into purist handwork and what Tania Harrod describes as "decommoditisation" Its rejection of a commercial role has been seen as a turning point in its fortunes. Nikolaus Pevsner in his book Pioneers of Modern Design presents the Arts and Crafts movement as design radicals who influenced the modern movement, but failed to change and were eventually superseded by it.

=== Later influences ===
The British artist potter Bernard Leach brought to England many ideas he had developed in Japan with the social critic Yanagi Soetsu about the moral and social value of simple crafts; both were enthusiastic readers of Ruskin. Leach was an active propagandist for these ideas, which struck a chord with practitioners of the crafts in the inter-war years, and he expounded them in A Potter's Book, published in 1940, which denounced industrial society in terms as vehement as those of Ruskin and Morris. Thus the Arts and Crafts philosophy was perpetuated among British craft workers in the 1950s and 1960s, long after the demise of the Arts and Crafts movement and at the high tide of Modernism. British Utility furniture of the 1940s also derived from Arts and Crafts principles.

One of its main promoters, Gordon Russell, chairman of the Utility Furniture Design Panel, was imbued with Arts and Crafts ideas. He manufactured furniture in the Cotswold Hills, a region of Arts and Crafts furniture-making since Ashbee, and he was a member of the Arts and Crafts Exhibition Society. William Morris's biographer, Fiona MacCarthy, detected the Arts and Crafts philosophy even behind the Festival of Britain (1951), the work of the designer Terence Conran (1931–2020) and the founding of the British Crafts Council in the 1970s.

== By region ==
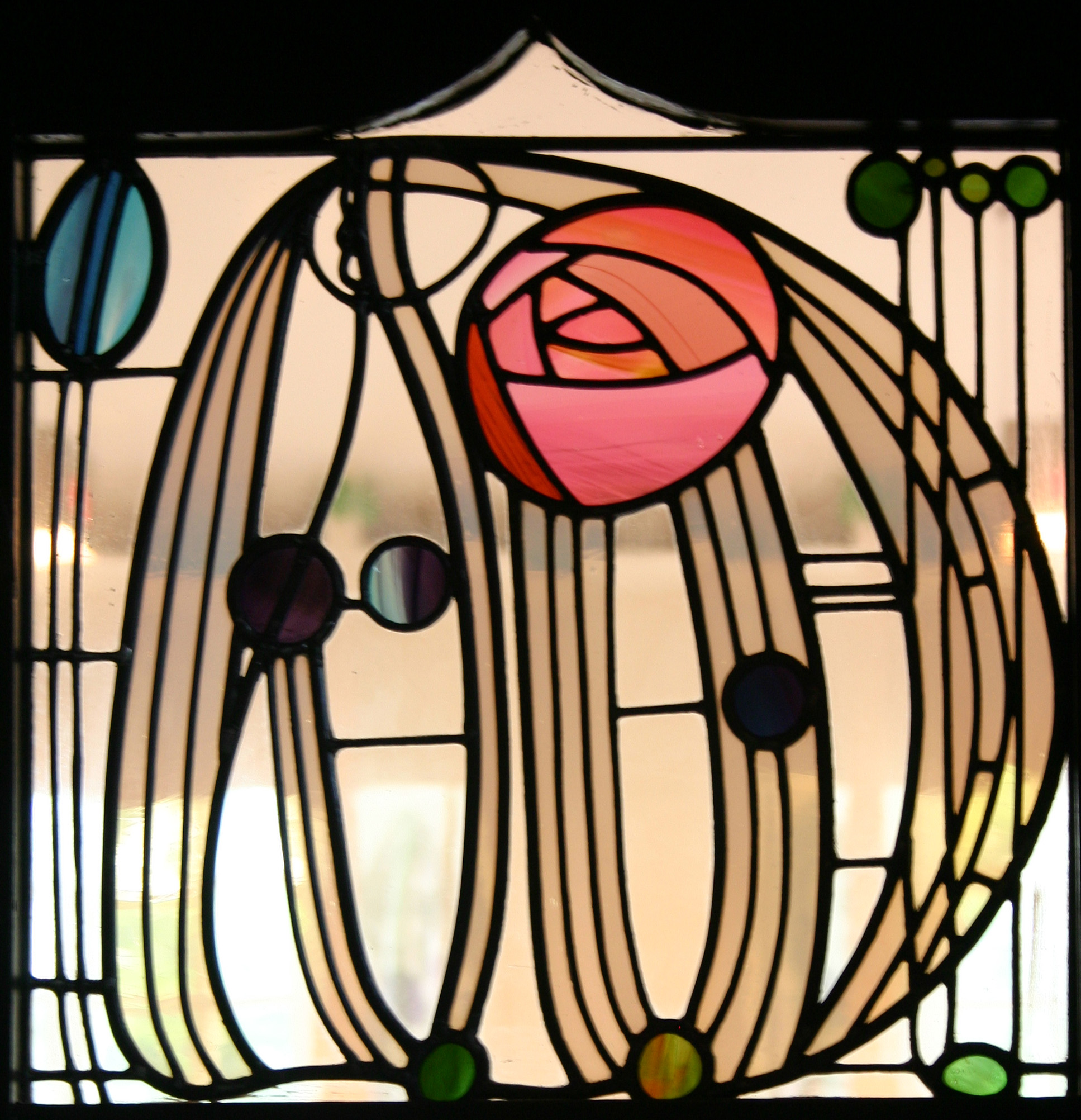
Stained glass window, the Hill House, Helensburgh, Argyll and Bute

=== The British Isles ===
==== Scotland ====
The beginnings of the Arts and Crafts movement in Scotland were in the stained glass revival of the 1850s, pioneered by James Ballantine (1806–1877). His major works included the great west window of Dunfermline Abbey and the scheme for St Giles Cathedral, Edinburgh. In Glasgow it was pioneered by Daniel Cottier (1838–1891), who had probably studied with Ballantine, and was directly influenced by William Morris, Ford Madox Brown and John Ruskin. His key works included the Baptism of Christ in Paisley Abbey, (c. 1880). His followers included Stephen Adam and his son of the same name.

The Glasgow-born designer and theorist Christopher Dresser (1834–1904) was one of the first, and most important, independent designers, a pivotal figure in the Aesthetic Movement and a major contributor to the allied Anglo-Japanese movement. The movement had an "extraordinary flowering" in Scotland where it was represented by the development of the 'Glasgow Style' which was based on the talent of the Glasgow School of Art. Celtic revival took hold here, and motifs such as the Glasgow rose became popularised. Charles Rennie Mackintosh (1868–1928) and the Glasgow School of Art were to influence others worldwide.

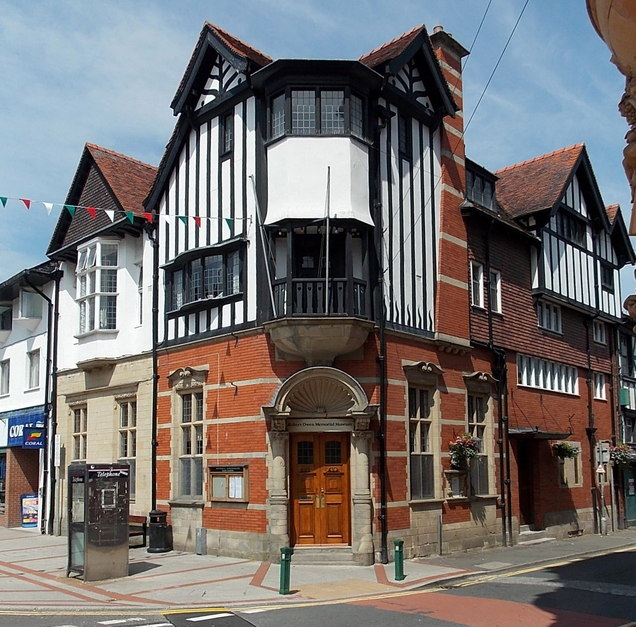
The Robert Owen Museum, Newtown, Wales, by Frank Shayler

==== Wales ====
The situation in Wales was different from elsewhere in the UK. Insofar as craftsmanship was concerned, Arts and Crafts was a revivalist campaign. But in Wales, at least until the First World War, a genuine craft tradition still existed. Local materials, stone or clay, continued to be used as a matter of course.

Scotland become known in the Arts and Crafts movement for its stained glass; Wales would become known for its pottery. By the mid 19th century, the heavy, salt glazes used for generations by local craftsmen had gone out of fashion, not least as mass-produced ceramics undercut prices. But the Arts and Crafts Movement brought new appreciation to their work. Horace W Elliot, an English gallerist, visited the Ewenny Pottery (which dated back to the 17th century) in 1885, to both find local pieces and encourage a style compatible with the movement. The pieces he brought back to London for the next twenty years revivified interest in Welsh pottery work.

A key promoter of the Arts and Crafts movement in Wales was Owen Morgan Edwards. Edwards was a reforming politician dedicated to renewing Welsh pride by exposing its people to their own language and history. For Edwards, "There is nothing that Wales requires more than an education in the arts and crafts." – though Edwards was more inclined to resurrecting Welsh Nationalism than admiring glazes or rustic integrity.

In architecture, Clough Williams-Ellis sought to renew interest in ancient building, reviving "rammed earth" or pisé construction in Britain.

==== Ireland ====
The movement spread to Ireland, representing an important time for the nation's cultural development, a visual counterpart to the literary revival of the same time and was a publication of Irish nationalism. The Arts and Crafts use of stained glass was popular in Ireland, with Harry Clarke the best-known artist and also with Evie Hone. The architecture of the style is represented by the Honan Chapel (1916) in Cork city in the grounds of University College Cork. Other architects practising in Ireland included Sir Edwin Lutyens (Heywood House in Co. Laois, Lambay Island and the Irish National War Memorial Gardens in Dublin) and Frederick 'Pa' Hicks (Malahide Castle estate buildings and round tower). Irish Celtic motifs were popular with the movement in silvercraft, carpet design, book illustrations, and hand-carved furniture.

=== Continental Europe ===
In continental Europe, the revival and preservation of national styles was an important motive of Arts and Crafts designers; for example, in Germany, after unification in 1871 under the encouragement of the Bund für Heimatschutz (1897) and the Vereinigte Werkstätten für Kunst im Handwerk founded in 1898 by Karl Schmidt; and in Hungary Károly Kós revived the vernacular style of Transylvanian building. In central Europe, where several diverse nationalities lived under powerful empires (Germany, Austria-Hungary and Russia), the discovery of the vernacular was associated with the assertion of national pride and the striving for independence, and, whereas for Arts and Crafts practitioners in Britain the ideal style was to be found in the medieval, in central Europe it was sought in remote peasant villages.

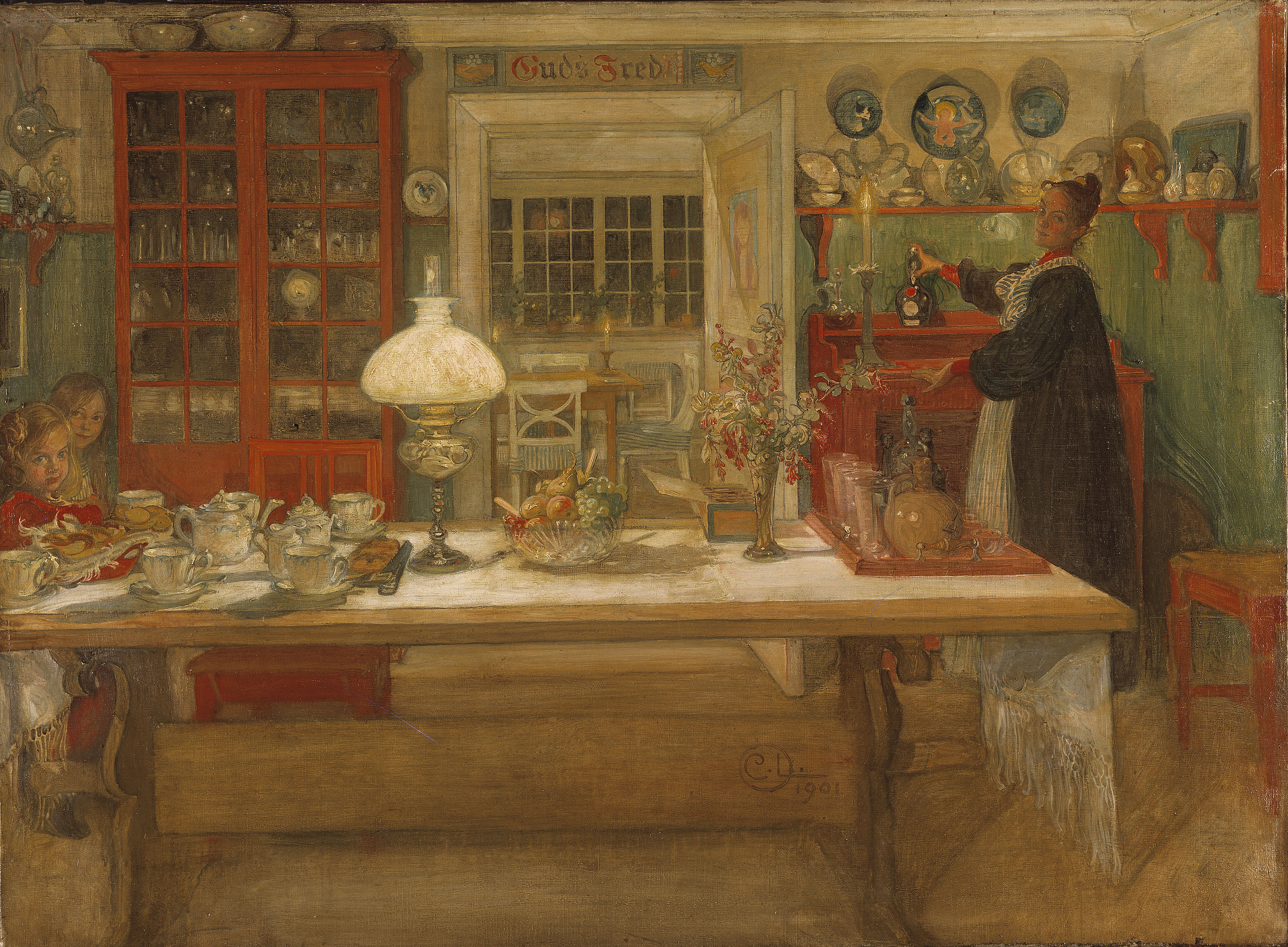
The Swedish artists Carl Larsson and Karin Larsson were inspired by the Arts and Crafts movement when designing their home.

Widely exhibited in Europe, the Arts and Crafts style's simplicity inspired designers like Henry van de Velde and styles such as Art Nouveau, the Dutch De Stijl group, Vienna Secession, and eventually the Bauhaus style. Pevsner regarded the style as a prelude to Modernism, which used simple forms without ornamentation.

The earliest Arts and Crafts activity in continental Europe was in Belgium in about 1890, where the English style inspired artists and architects including Henry Van de Velde, Gabriel Van Dievoet, Gustave Serrurier-Bovy, and a group known as La Libre Esthétique (Free Aesthetic).

Arts and Crafts products were admired in Austria and Germany in the early 20th century, and under their inspiration design moved rapidly forward while it stagnated in Britain. The Wiener Werkstätte, founded in 1903 by Josef Hoffmann and Koloman Moser, was influenced by the Arts and Crafts principles of the "unity of the arts" and the hand-made. The Deutscher Werkbund (German Association of Craftsmen) was formed in 1907 as an association of artists, architects, designers, and industrialists to improve the global competitiveness of German businesses and became an important element in the development of modern architecture and industrial design through its advocacy of standardised production. However, its leading members, van de Velde and Hermann Muthesius, had conflicting opinions about standardisation. Muthesius believed that it was essential were Germany to become a leading nation in trade and culture. Van de Velde, representing a more traditional Arts and Crafts attitude, believed that artists would forever "protest against the imposition of orders or standardization," and that "The artist ... will never, of his own accord, submit to a discipline which imposes on him a canon or a type."

In Finland, an idealistic artists' colony in Helsinki was designed by Herman Gesellius, Armas Lindgren, and Eliel Saarinen, who worked in the National Romantic style, akin to the British Gothic Revival.

In Hungary, under the influence of Ruskin and Morris, a group of artists and architects, including Károly Kós, Aladár Körösfői-Kriesch, and Ede Toroczkai Wigand, discovered the folk art and vernacular architecture of Transylvania. Many of Kós's buildings, including those in the Budapest zoo and the Wekerle estate in the same city, show this influence.

In Russia, Viktor Hartmann, Viktor Vasnetsov, Yelena Polenova, and other artists associated with Abramtsevo Colony sought to revive the quality of medieval Russian decorative arts quite independently from the movement in Great Britain.

In Iceland, Sölvi Helgason's work shows Arts and Crafts influence.

=== North America ===
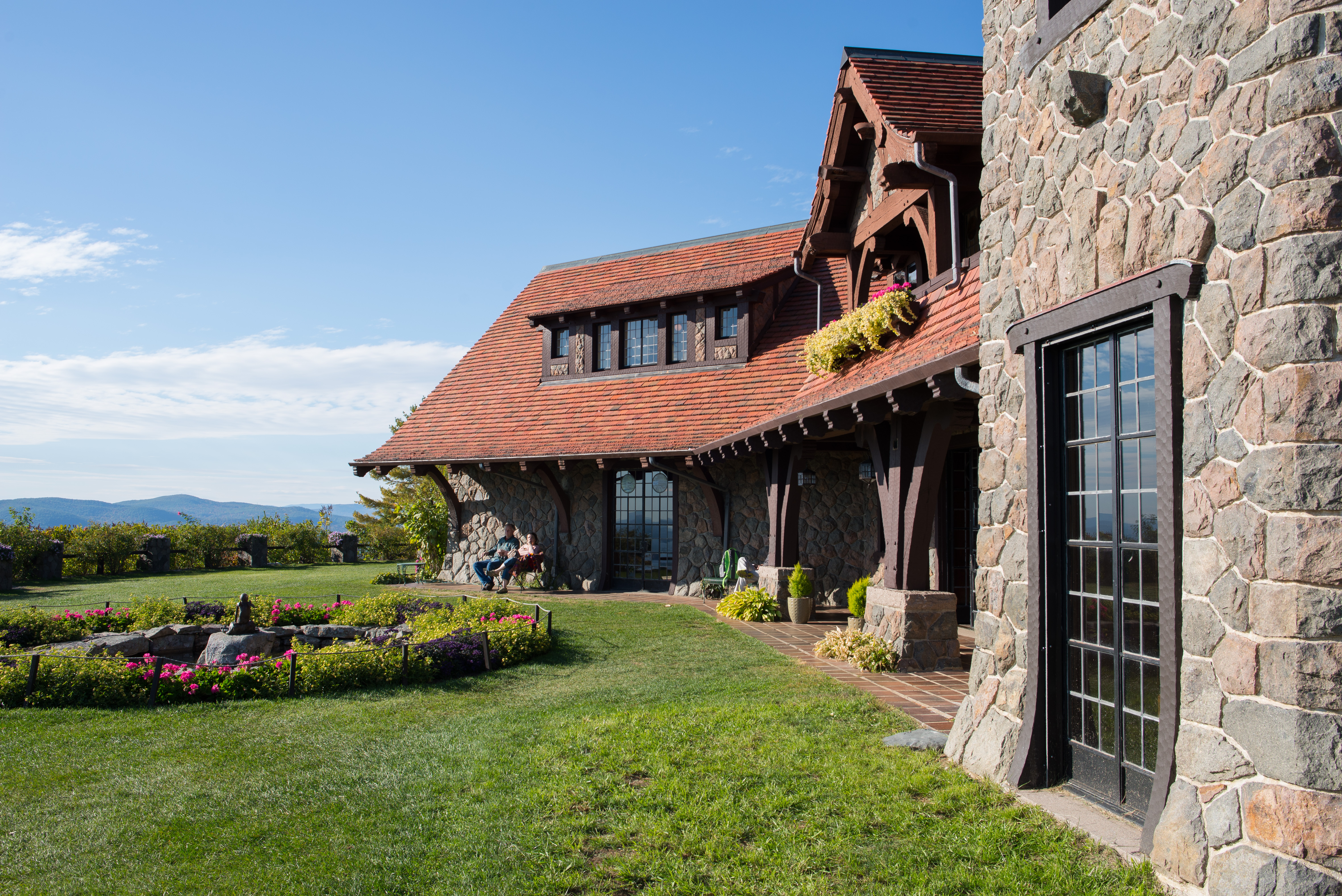
Facade of the Castle in the Clouds and lawn overlooking Lake Winnipesaukee in New Hampshire, built 1913–1914

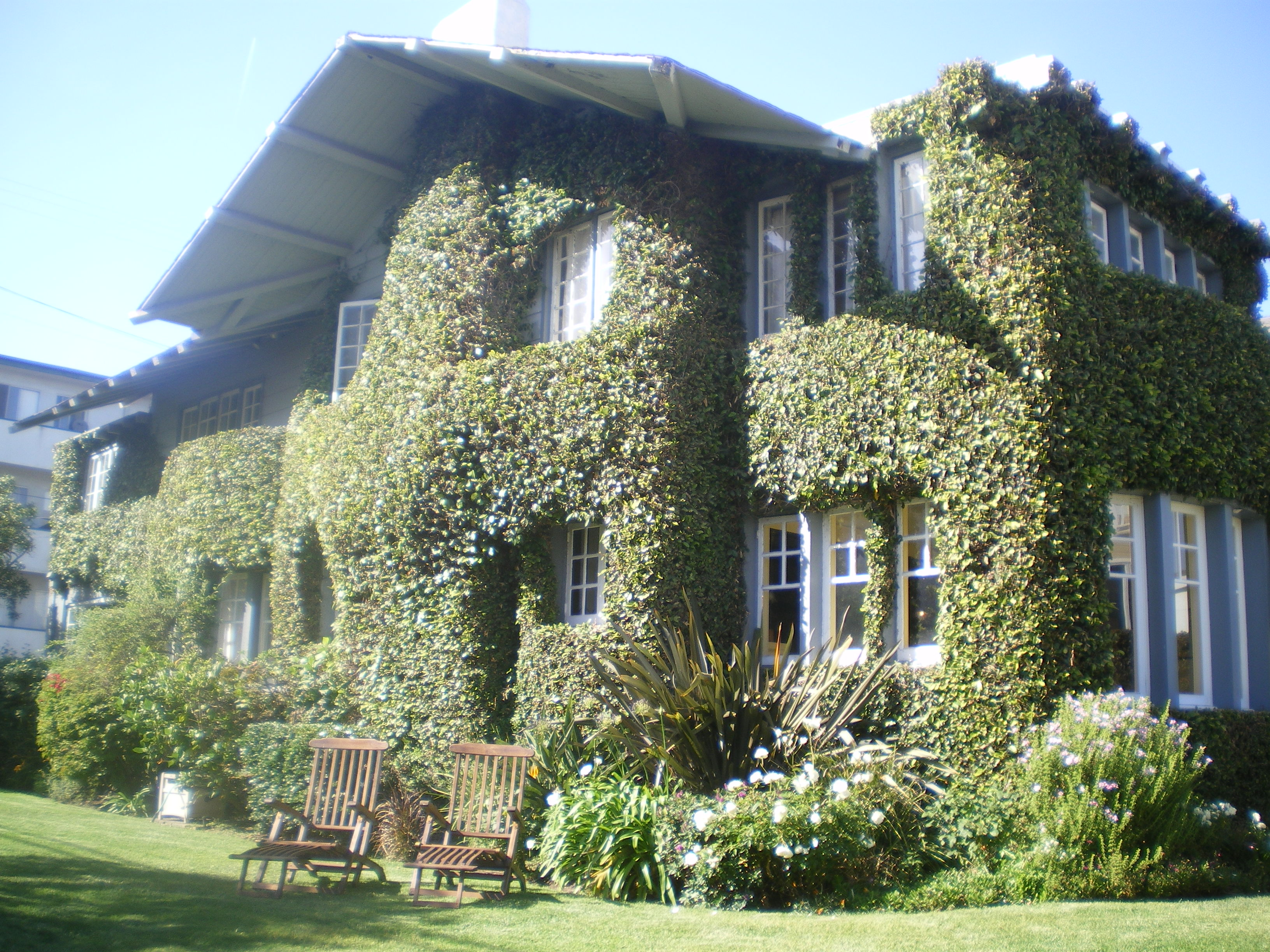
Warren Wilson Beach House (The Venice Beach House), Venice, California

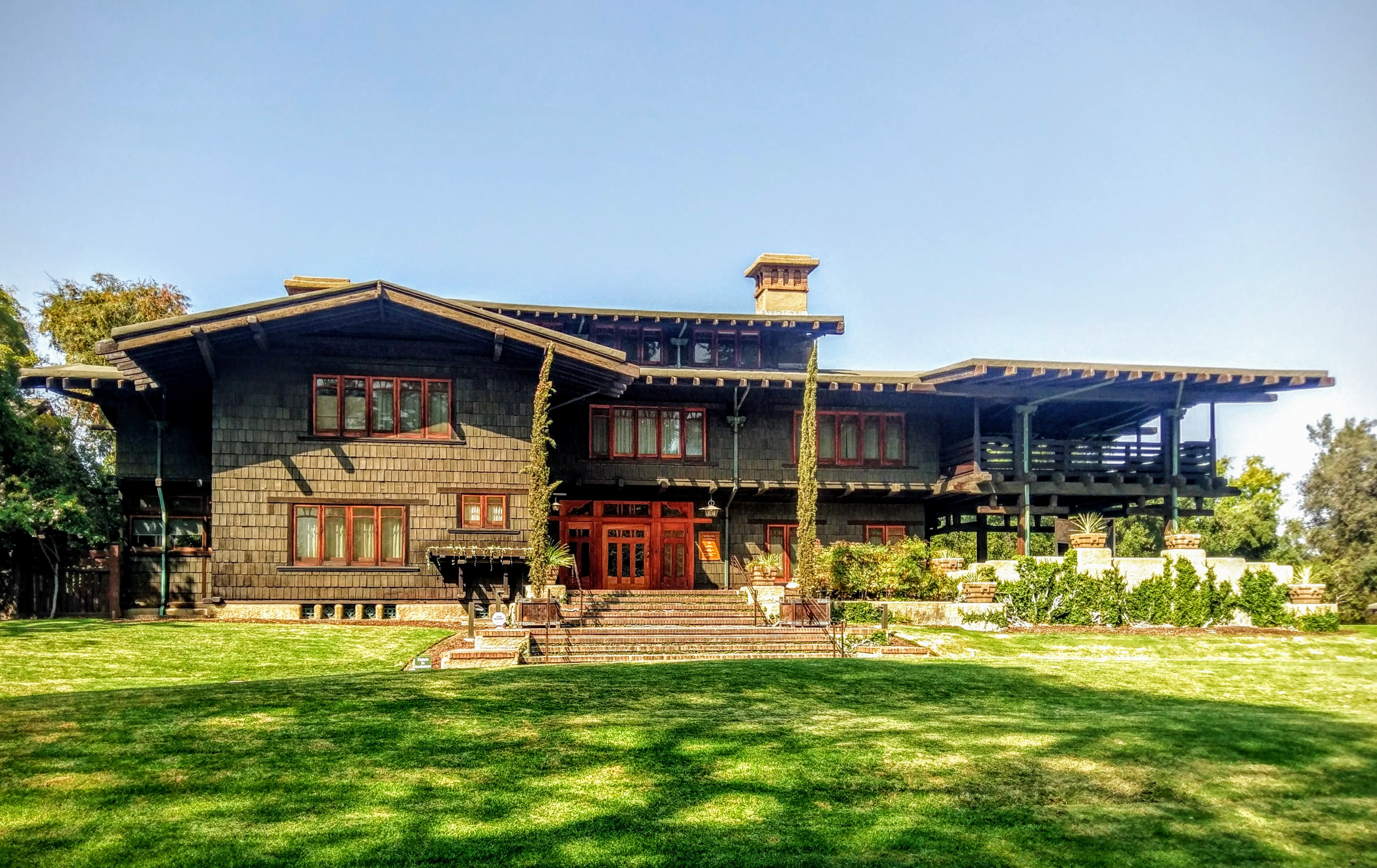
Gamble House, Pasadena, California

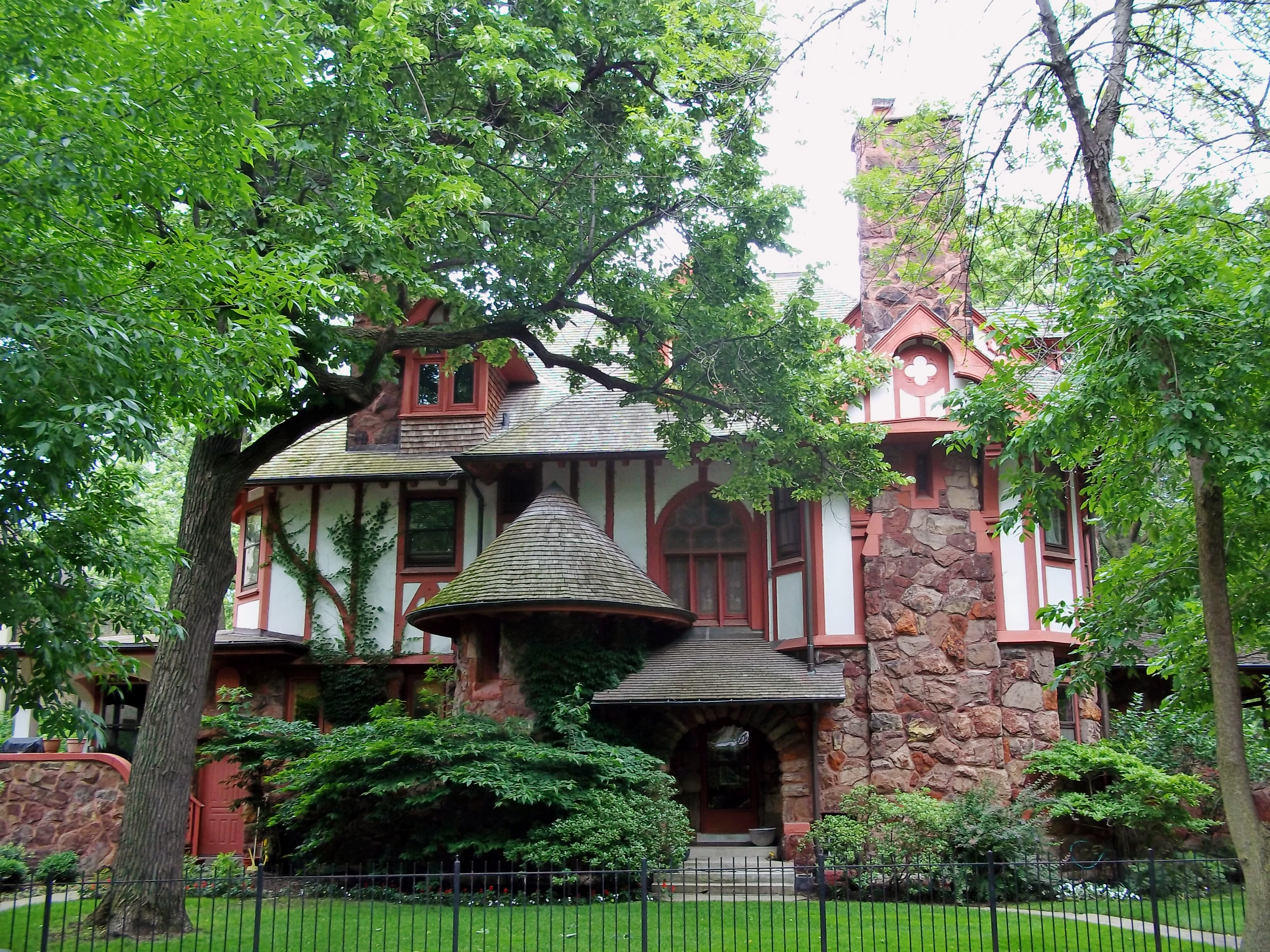
Arts and Crafts Tudor home in the Buena Park Historic District, Uptown, Chicago

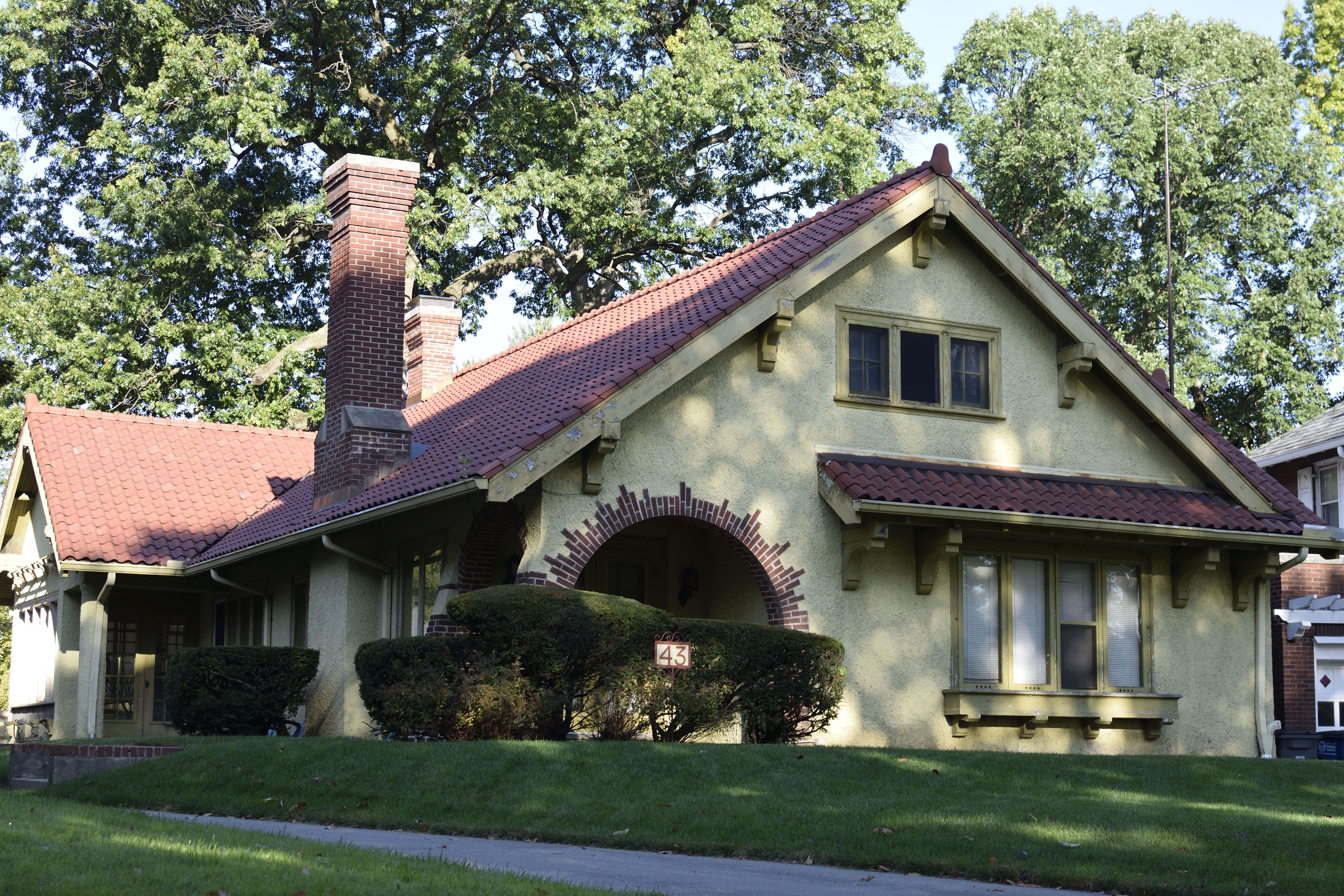
Arts and Crafts home in the Birckhead Place neighbourhood of Toledo, Ohio

In the United States, the Arts and Crafts style initiated a variety of attempts to reinterpret European Arts and Crafts ideals for Americans. These included the "Craftsman"-style architecture, furniture, and other decorative arts such as designs promoted by Gustav Stickley in his magazine, The Craftsman and designs produced on the Roycroft campus as publicised in Elbert Hubbard's The Fra. Both men used their magazines as a vehicle to promote the goods produced with the Craftsman workshop in Eastwood, New York, and Elbert Hubbard's Roycroft campus in East Aurora, New York. A host of imitators of Stickley's furniture (the designs of which are often mislabelled the "Mission Style") included three companies established by his brothers.

The terms American Craftsman or Craftsman style are often used to denote the style of architecture, interior design, and decorative arts that prevailed between the dominant eras of Art Nouveau and Art Deco in the US, or approximately the period from 1910 to 1925. The movement was particularly notable for the professional opportunities it opened up for women as artisans, designers and entrepreneurs who founded and ran, or were employed by, such successful enterprises as the Kalo Shops, Pewabic Pottery, Rookwood Pottery, and Tiffany Studios. In Canada, the term Arts and Crafts predominates, but Craftsman is also recognised.

While the Europeans tried to recreate the virtuous crafts being replaced by industrialisation, Americans tried to establish a new type of virtue to replace heroic craft production: well-decorated middle-class homes. They claimed that the simple but refined aesthetics of Arts and Crafts decorative arts would ennoble the new experience of industrial consumerism, making individuals more rational and society more harmonious. The American Arts and Crafts movement was the aesthetic counterpart of its contemporary political philosophy, progressivism. Characteristically, when the Arts and Crafts Society began in October 1897 in Chicago, it was at Hull House, one of the first American settlement houses for social reform.

Arts and Crafts ideals disseminated in America through journal and newspaper writing were supplemented by societies that sponsored lectures. The first was organised in Boston in the late 1890s, when a group of influential architects, designers, and educators determined to bring to America the design reforms begun in Britain by William Morris; they met to organise an exhibition of contemporary craft objects. The first meeting was held on 4 January 1897, at the Museum of Fine Arts (MFA) in Boston to organise an exhibition of contemporary crafts. When craftsmen, consumers, and manufacturers realised the aesthetic and technical potential of the applied arts, the process of design reform in Boston started. Present at this meeting were General Charles Loring, Chairman of the Trustees of the MFA; William Sturgis Bigelow and Denman Ross, collectors, writers and MFA trustees; Ross Turner, painter; Sylvester Baxter, art critic for the Boston Transcript; Howard Baker, A. W. Longfellow Jr.; and Ralph Clipson Sturgis, architect.

The first American Arts and Crafts Exhibition began on 5 April 1897, at Copley Hall, Boston, featuring more than 1000 objects made by 160 craftsmen, half of whom were women. Some of the advocates of the exhibit were Langford Warren, founder of Harvard's School of Architecture; Mrs. Richard Morris Hunt; Arthur Astor Carey and Edwin Mead, social reformers; and Will H. Bradley, graphic designer. The success of this exhibition resulted in the incorporation of The Society of Arts and Crafts (SAC), on 28 June 1897, with a mandate to "develop and encourage higher standards in the handicrafts." The 21 founders claimed to be interested in more than sales, and emphasised encouragement of artists to produce work with the best quality of workmanship and design. This mandate was soon expanded into a credo, possibly written by the SAC's first president, Charles Eliot Norton, which read:

This Society was incorporated for the purpose of promoting artistic work in all branches of handicraft. It hopes to bring Designers and Workmen into mutually helpful relations, and to encourage workmen to execute designs of their own. It endeavors to stimulate in workmen an appreciation of the dignity and value of good design; to counteract the popular impatience of Law and Form, and the desire for over-ornamentation and specious originality. It will insist upon the necessity of sobriety and restraint, or ordered arrangement, of due regard for the relation between the form of an object and its use, and of harmony and fitness in the decoration put upon it.

The Castle in the Clouds (also known as Lucknow), a mountaintop estate in the Ossipee Mountains of New Hampshire, built in 1913–14 by the Boston architect J. Williams Beal for Tom and Olive Plant, is an excellent example of the American Craftsman style in New England.,

Also influential were the Roycroft community initiated by Elbert Hubbard in Buffalo and East Aurora, New York, Joseph Marbella, utopian communities like Byrdcliffe Colony in Woodstock, New York, and Rose Valley, Pennsylvania, developments such as Mountain Lakes, New Jersey, featuring clusters of bungalow and chateau homes built by Herbert J. Hapgood, and the contemporary studio craft style. Studio pottery – exemplified by the Grueby Faience Company, Newcomb Pottery in New Orleans, Marblehead Pottery, Teco pottery, Overbeck and Rookwood pottery, the Fulper Pottery in New Jersey, and Mary Chase Perry Stratton's Pewabic Pottery in Detroit, the Van Briggle Pottery company in Colorado Springs, Colorado, as well as the art tiles made by Ernest A. Batchelder in Pasadena, California, and idiosyncratic furniture of Charles Rohlfs all demonstrate the influence of Arts and Crafts.

In Canada, artist, teacher and architect George Agnew Reid (1860–1947) was a major proponent of the Arts and Crafts movement. Reid was interested in linking art and social issues, and he felt strongly that visual and applied arts could act as tools for personal and social improvement through public access to beauty and good design. Reid brought his "art for life's sake" sensibility to his painting practice, specifically with the murals he created in and around Toronto. Reid was also the founding vice-president of the Arts and Crafts Society of Canada (renamed the Canadian Society of Applied Arts)

==== Architecture and art ====
The "Prairie School" of Frank Lloyd Wright, George Washington Maher, and other architects in Chicago, the Country Day School movement, the bungalow and ultimate bungalow style of houses popularised by Greene and Greene, Julia Morgan, and Bernard Maybeck are some examples of the American Arts and Crafts and American Craftsman style of architecture. Restored and landmark-protected examples are still present in America, especially in California in Berkeley and Pasadena, and the sections of other towns originally developed during the era and not experiencing post-war urban renewal. Mission Revival, Prairie School, and the 'California bungalow' styles of residential building remain popular in the United States today.

As theoreticians, educators, and prolific artists in mediums from printmaking to pottery and pastel, two of the most influential figures were Arthur Wesley Dow (1857–1922) on the East Coast and Pedro Joseph de Lemos (1882–1954) in California. Dow, who taught at Columbia University and founded the Ipswich Summer School of Art, published in 1899 his landmark Composition, which distilled into a distinctly American approach the essence of Japanese composition, combining into a decorative harmonious amalgam three elements: simplicity of line, "notan" (the balance of light and dark areas), and symmetry of colour.

His purpose was to create objects that were finely crafted and beautifully rendered. His student de Lemos, who became head of the San Francisco Art Institute, Director of the Stanford University Museum and Art Gallery, and Editor-in-Chief of the School Arts Magazine, expanded and substantially revised Dow's ideas in over 150 monographs and articles for art schools in the United States and Britain. Among his unorthodox teachings was his belief that manufactured products could express "the sublime beauty" and that great insight was to be found in the abstract "design forms" of pre-Columbian civilisations.

==== Museums ====
The Museum of the American Arts and Crafts Movement (MAACM) in St Petersburg, Florida, displays an extensive collection of fine and decorative arts from the American Arts and Crafts movement (c. 1880-1920).

=== Asia ===
In Japan, Yanagi Sōetsu, creator of the Mingei movement which promoted folk art from the 1920s onwards, was influenced by the writings of Morris and Ruskin. Like the Arts and Crafts movement in Europe, Mingei sought to preserve traditional crafts and often used medieval, romantic, or folk styles of decoration. It advocated economic and social reform and was anti-industrial in its orientation. It had a strong influence on the arts in Europe until it was displaced by Modernism in the 1930s, and its influence continued among craft makers, designers, and town planners long afterwards.

== Architecture ==
The movement ... represents in some sense a revolt against the hard mechanical conventional life and its insensibility to beauty (quite another thing to ornament). It is a protest against that so-called industrial progress which produces shoddy wares, the cheapness of which is paid for by the lives of their producers and the degradation of their users. It is a protest against the turning of men into machines, against artificial distinctions in art, and against making the immediate market value, or possibility of profit, the chief test of artistic merit. It also advances the claim of all and each to the common possession of beauty in things common and familiar, and would awaken the sense of this beauty, deadened and depressed as it now too often is, either on the one hand by luxurious superfluities, or on the other by the absence of the commonest necessities and the gnawing anxiety for the means of livelihood; not to speak of the everyday uglinesses to which we have accustomed our eyes, confused by the flood of false taste, or darkened by the hurried life of modern towns in which huge aggregations of humanity exist, equally removed from both art and nature and their kindly and refining influences.

— Walter Crane, "Of The Revival of Design and Handicraft", Arts and Crafts Essays (1893)

Many of the leaders of the Arts and Crafts movement were trained as architects (e.g. William Morris, A. H. Mackmurdo, C. R. Ashbee, W. R. Lethaby) and it was on building that the movement had its most visible and lasting influence.

Red House, in Bexleyheath, London, designed for Morris in 1859 by architect Philip Webb, exemplifies the early Arts and Crafts style, with its well-proportioned solid forms, wide porches, steep roof, pointed window arches, brick fireplaces and wooden fittings. Webb rejected classical and other revivals of historical styles based on grand buildings, and based his design on British vernacular architecture, expressing the texture of ordinary materials, such as stone and tiles, with an asymmetrical and picturesque building composition.

The London suburb of Bedford Park, built mainly in the 1880s and 1890s, has about 360 Arts and Crafts style houses and was once famous for its Aesthetic residents. Several Almshouses were built in the Arts and Crafts style, for example, Whiteley Village, Surrey, built between 1914 and 1917, with over 280 buildings, and the Dyers Almshouses, Sussex, built between 1939 and 1971. Letchworth Garden City, the first garden city, was inspired by Arts and Crafts ideals.

The first houses were designed by Barry Parker and Raymond Unwin in the vernacular style popularised by the movement and the town became associated with high-mindedness and simple living. The sandal-making workshop set up by Edward Carpenter moved from Yorkshire to Letchworth Garden City and George Orwell's jibe about "every fruit-juice drinker, nudist, sandal-wearer, sex-maniac, Quaker, 'Nature Cure' quack, pacifist, and feminist in England" going to a socialist conference in Letchworth has become famous.

=== Architectural examples ===
- Red House – Upton, Bexley Heath, Kent – 1859
- David Parr House – Cambridge, England – 1886–1926
- Wightwick Manor – Wolverhampton, England – 1887–1893
- Inglewood – Leicester, England – 1892
- Standen – East Grinstead, England – 1894
- Swedenborgian Church – San Francisco, California – 1895
- Mary Ward House – Bloomsbury, London – 1896–1898
- Blackwell – Lake District, England – 1898
- Derwent House – Chislehurst, Bromley, Kent – 1899
- Stoneywell – Ulverscroft, Leicestershire – 1899
- Long Street Methodist Church – Middleton, Greater Manchester – 1899
- Spade House – Sandgate, Kent – 1900
- Caledonian Estate – Islington, London – 1900–1907
- Horniman Museum – Forest Hill, London – 1901
- All Saints' Church, Brockhampton – 1901–02
- Shaw's Corner – Ayot St Lawrence, Hertfordshire – 1902
- Pierre P. Ferry House – Seattle, Washington – 1903–1906
- Winterbourne House – Birmingham, England – 1904
- The Black Friar – Blackfriars, London – 1905
- Marston House – San Diego, California – 1905
- Edgar Wood Centre – Manchester, England – 1905
- Debenham House – Holland Park, London – 1905–1907
- Belrock – Greater Sudbury, Ontario – 1907
- Robert R. Blacker House – Pasadena, California – 1907
- Stotfold, Bickley, Kent – 1907
- Gamble House – Pasadena, California – 1908
- Oregon Public Library – Oregon, Illinois – 1909
- Thorsen House – Berkeley, California – 1909
- Rodmarton Manor – Rodmarton, near Cirencester, Gloucestershire – 1909–1929
- Whare Ra – Havelock North, New Zealand – 1912
- Sutton Garden Suburb – Benhilton, Sutton, London – 1912–1914
- The Omni Grove Park Inn – Asheville, North Carolina – 1913
- Castle in the Clouds – Ossipee Mountains at Lake Winnipesaukee, New Hampshire – 1913–14
- Honan Chapel – University College Cork, Ireland – c. 1916
- St Francis Xavier's Cathedral – Geraldton, Western Australia 1916–1938
- Bedales School Memorial Library – near Petersfield, Hampshire – 1919–1921
- House of the Democrat – Rose Valley, Pennsylvania 1911–12
- Craftsman Farms – Parsippany, New Jersey – 1911

== Garden design ==
Gertrude Jekyll applied Arts and Crafts principles to garden design. She worked with the English architect, Sir Edwin Lutyens, for whose projects she created numerous landscapes, and who designed her home Munstead Wood, near Godalming in Surrey. Jekyll created the gardens for Bishopsbarns, the home of York architect Walter Brierley, an exponent of the Arts and Crafts movement and known as the "Lutyens of the North". The garden for Brierley's final project, Goddards in York, was the work of George Dillistone, a gardener who worked with Lutyens and Jekyll at Castle Drogo. At Goddards the garden incorporated a number of features that reflected the arts and crafts style of the house, such as the use of hedges and herbaceous borders to divide the garden into a series of outdoor rooms.

Another notable Arts and Crafts garden is Hidcote Manor Garden designed by Lawrence Johnston which is also laid out in a series of outdoor rooms and where, like Goddards, the landscaping becomes less formal further away from the house. Other examples of Arts and Crafts gardens include Hestercombe Gardens, Lytes Cary Manor and the gardens of some of the architectural examples of arts and crafts buildings (listed above).

== Art education ==
Morris's ideas were adopted by the New Education Movement in the late 1880s, which incorporated handicraft teaching in schools at Abbotsholme (1889) and Bedales (1892), and his influence has been noted in the social experiments of Dartington Hall during the mid-20th century.

Arts and Crafts practitioners in Britain were critical of the government system of art education based on design in the abstract with little teaching of practical craft. This lack of craft training also caused concern in industrial and official circles, and in 1884 a Royal Commission (accepting the advice of William Morris) recommended that art education should pay more attention to the suitability of design to the material in which it was to be executed. The first school to make this change was the Birmingham School of Arts and Crafts, which "led the way in introducing executed design to the teaching of art and design nationally (working in the material for which the design was intended rather than designing on paper). In his external examiner's report of 1889, Walter Crane praised Birmingham School of Art in that it 'considered design in relationship to materials and usage.'" Under the direction of Edward Taylor, its headmaster from 1877 to 1903, and with the help of Henry Payne and Joseph Southall, the Birmingham School became a leading Arts-and-Crafts centre.

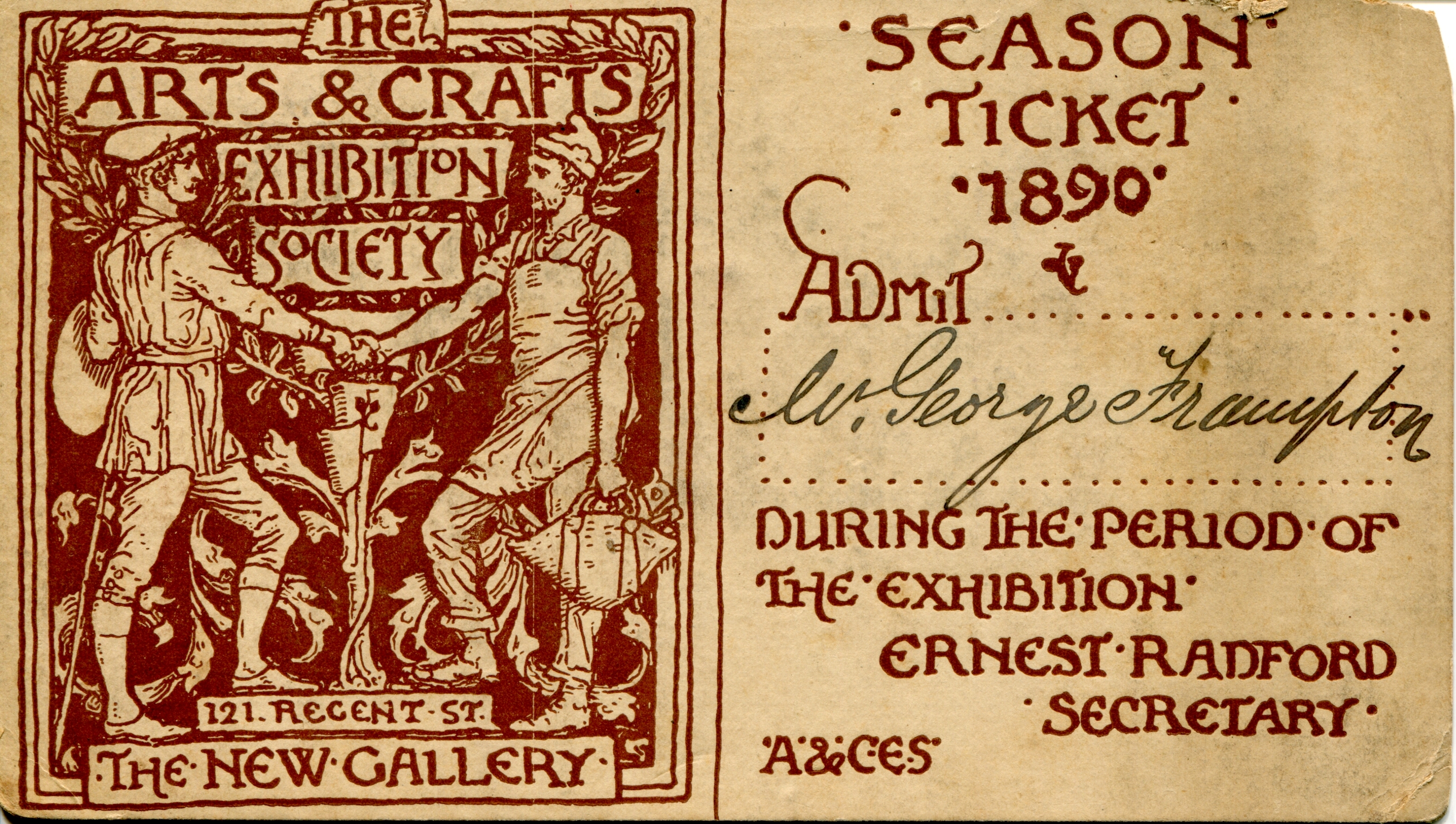
Season ticket to The Arts and Craft Exhibition Society, George Frampton, 1890

Other local authority schools also began to introduce more practical teaching of crafts, and by the 1890s Arts and Crafts ideals were being disseminated by members of the Art Workers Guild into art schools throughout the country. Members of the Guild held influential positions: Walter Crane was director of the Manchester School of Art and subsequently the Royal College of Art; F. M. Simpson, Robert Anning Bell and C. J. Allen were respectively professor of architecture, instructor in painting and design, and instructor in sculpture at Liverpool School of Art; Robert Catterson-Smith, the headmaster of the Birmingham Art School from 1902 to 1920, was also an AWG member; W. R. Lethaby and George Frampton were inspectors and advisors to the London County Council's (LCC) education board and in 1896, largely as a result of their work, the LCC set up the Central School of Arts and Crafts and made them joint principals. Until the formation of the Bauhaus in Germany, the Central School was regarded as the most progressive art school in Europe. Shortly after its foundation, the Camberwell School of Arts and Crafts was set up on Arts and Crafts lines by the local borough council.

As head of the Royal College of Art in 1898, Crane tried to reform it along more practical lines, but resigned after a year, defeated by the bureaucracy of the Board of Education, who then appointed Augustus Spencer to implement his plan. Spencer brought in Lethaby to head its school of design and several members of the Art Workers' Guild as teachers. Ten years after reform, a committee of inquiry reviewed the RCA and found that it was still not adequately training students for industry.

In the debate that followed the publication of the committee's report, C. R. Ashbee published a highly critical essay, Should We Stop Teaching Art, in which he called for the system of art education to be completely dismantled and for the crafts to be learned in state-subsidised workshops instead. Lewis Foreman Day, an important figure in the Arts and Crafts movement, took a different view in his dissenting report to the committee of inquiry, arguing for greater emphasis on principles of design against the growing orthodoxy of teaching design by direct working in materials. Nevertheless, the Arts and Crafts ethos thoroughly pervaded British art schools and persisted, in the view of the historian of art education, Stuart MacDonald, until after the Second World War.

== Leading practitioners ==
- Charles Robert Ashbee
- William Swinden Barber
- Barnsley brothers
- Detmar Blow
- Herbert Tudor Buckland
- Rowland Wilfred William Carter
- T. J. Cobden-Sanderson
- Walter Crane
- Nelson Dawson
- Lewis Foreman Day
- Harry Dixon
- Christopher Dresser
- Dirk van Erp
- Thomas Phillips Figgis
- Eric Gill
- Ernest Gimson
- Greene & Greene
- Elbert Hubbard
- Norman Jewson
- Ralph Johonnot
- Florence Koehler
- Frederick Leach
- William Lethaby
- Charles Limbert
- Edwin Lutyens
- Charles Rennie Mackintosh
- A. H. Mackmurdo
- Samuel Maclure
- George Washington Maher
- Bernard Maybeck
- Henry Chapman Mercer
- Julia Morgan
- William De Morgan
- William Morris
- Karl Parsons
- Alfred Hoare Powell
- William Lightfoot Price
- Edward Schroeder Prior
- Hugh C. Robertson
- William Robinson
- Charles Rohlfs
- Baillie Scott
- Norman Shaw
- Ellen Gates Starr
- Gustav Stickley
- Phoebe Anna Traquair
- C.F.A. Voysey
- Margaret Ely Webb
- Philip Webb
- Christopher Whall
- Edgar Wood

== Decorative arts gallery ==
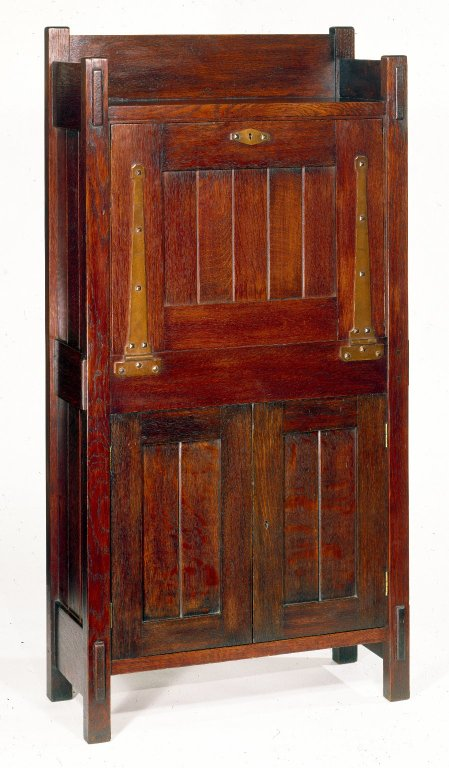
Dropfront Desk by Gustav Stickley (ca. 1903), Brooklyn Museum

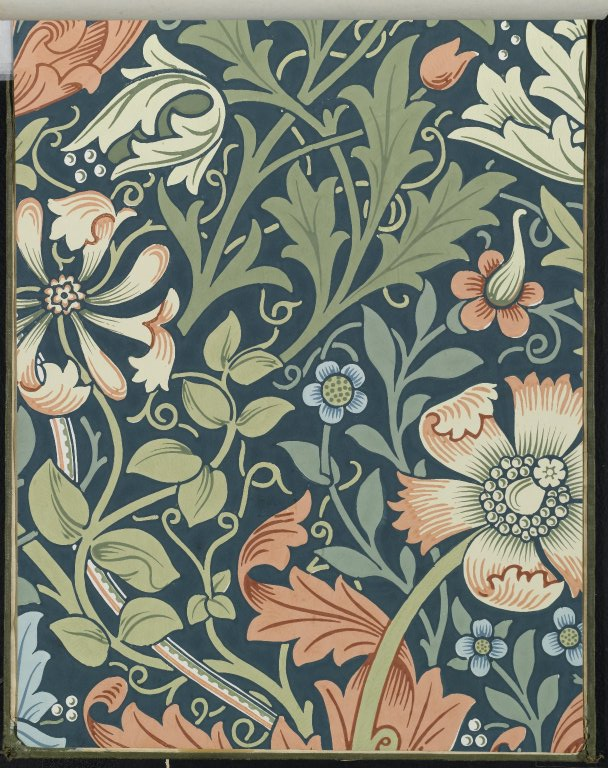
Wallpaper sample, Compton 323, by William Morris (c. 1917), Brooklyn Museum

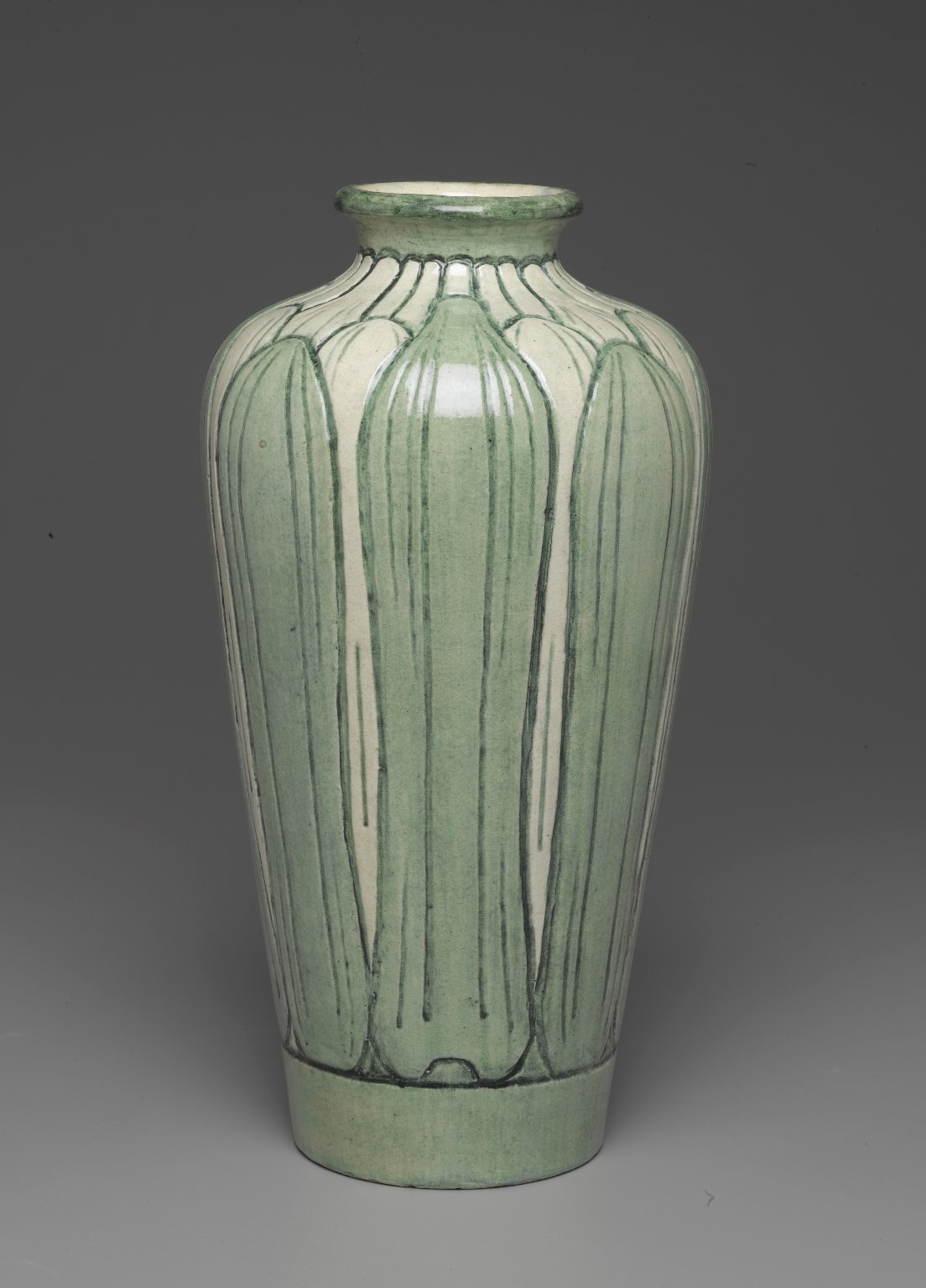
Vase by Newcomb Pottery (1902–1904), Brooklyn Museum

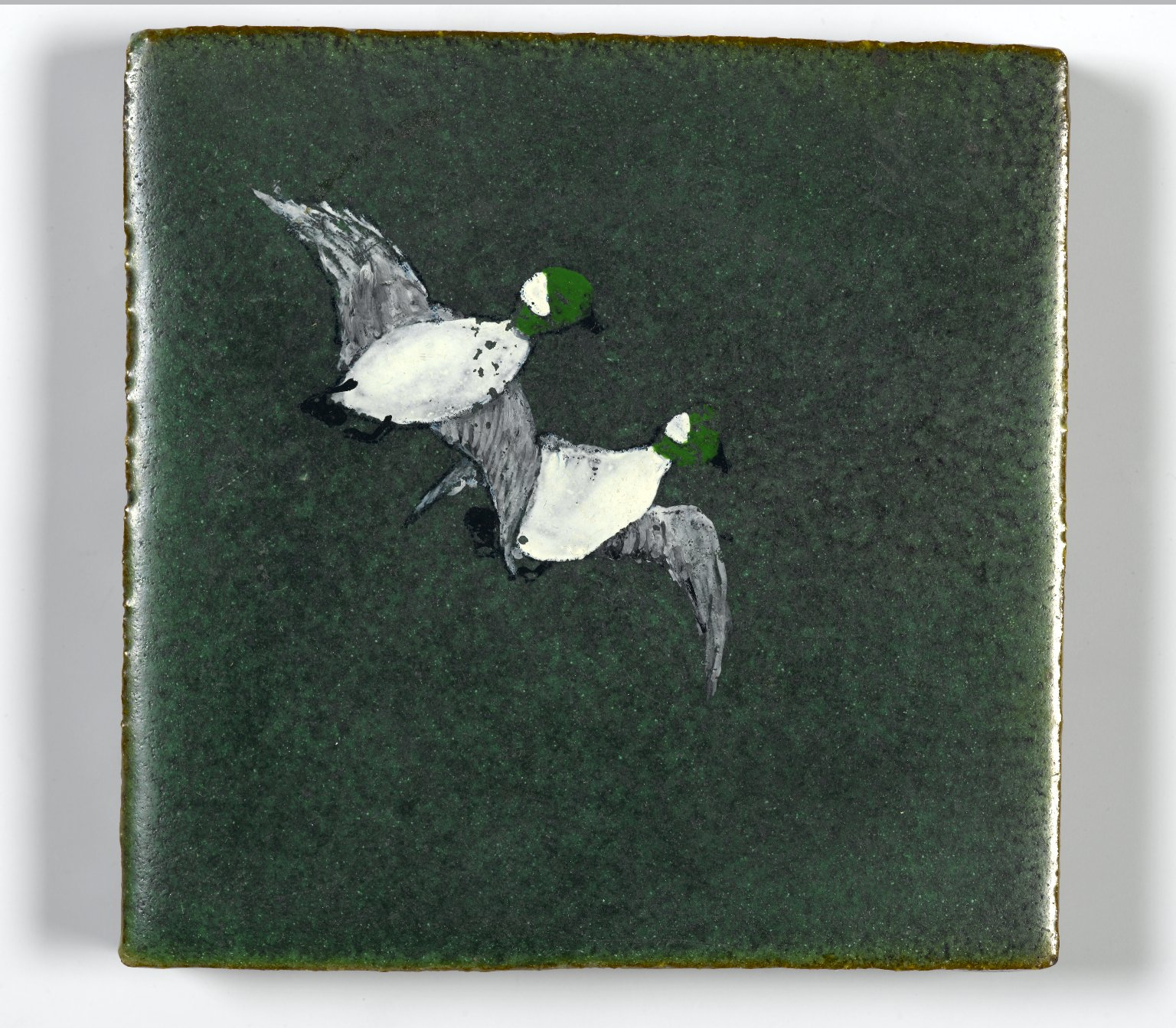
Tile by Mueller Mosaic Company (ca. 1910), Brooklyn Museum

== See also ==
- Modern Style (British Art Nouveau style)
- Philip Clissett
- The English House
- Charles Prendergast
- William Morris wallpaper designs
- William Morris textile designs
- History of schools of economic thought on arts and culture

== Bibliography and further reading ==
- Arts and Crafts Exhibition Society (1893). Arts and Crafts Essays London : Rivington, Percival, & Co.
- Ayers, Dianne (2002). American Arts and Crafts Textiles. New York: Harry N. Abrams. ISBN 0-8109-0434-9.
- Blakesley, Rosalind P (2006). The arts and crafts movement. Phaidon. ISBN 978-0-7148-4967-6.
- Boris, Eileen (1986). Art and Labor. Philadelphia: Temple University Press. ISBN 0-87722-384-X.
- Carruthers, Annette (2013). The Arts and Crafts Movement in Scotland: A History. Paul Mellon Centre for Studies in British Art. ISBN 978-0-300-19576-7. online review
- Cathers, David M. (1981). Furniture of the American Arts and Crafts Movement. The New American Library, Inc. ISBN 0-453-00397-4.
- Cathers, David M. (2014). So Various Are The Forms It Assumes: American Arts & Crafts Furniture from the Two Red Roses Foundation. Marquand Books. ISBN 978-0-692-21348-3.
- Cathers, David M. (20 February 2017). These Humbler Metals: Arts and Crafts Metalwork from the Two Red Roses Foundation Collection. Marquand Books. ISBN 978-0-615-98869-6.
- Cormack, Peter. Arts & crafts stained glass (Yale UP, 2015).
- Cumming, Elizabeth; Kaplan, Wendy (1991). Arts & Crafts Movement. London: Thames & Hudson. ISBN 0-500-20248-6.
- Cumming, Elizabeth (2006). Hand, Heart and Soul: The Arts and Crafts Movement in Scotland. Birlinn. ISBN 978-1-84158-419-5.
- Danahay, Martin. "Arts and Crafts as a Transatlantic Movement: CR Ashbee in the United States, 1896–1915." Journal of Victorian Culture 20.1 (2015): 65–86.
- Fiell, Charlotte; Fiell, Peter (2005). Design of the 20th Century (25th anniversary ed.). Köln: Taschen. pp. 62–69. ISBN 9783822840788. OCLC 809539744.
- Greensted, Mary. The arts and crafts movement in Britain (Shire, 2010).
- Guiler, Thomas A (2025) The Handcrafted Utopia: Arts and Crafts Communities in America's Progressive Era Richard W. Couper Press, Clinton, New York, ISBN 978-1-937370-43-5
- Johnson, Bruce (2012). Arts & Crafts Shopmarks. Fletcher, NC: Knock On Wood Publications. ISBN 978-1-4507-9024-6.
- Kaplan, Wendy (1987). The Art that Is Life: The Arts & Crafts Movement in America 1875-1920. New York: Little, Brown and Company.
- Kreisman, Lawrence, and Glenn Mason. The Arts & Craft Movement in the Pacific Northwest (Timber Press, 2007).
- Krugh, Michele. "Joy in labour: The politicization of craft from the arts and crafts movement to Etsy." Canadian Review of American Studies 44.2 (2014): 281–301. online
- Luckman, Susan. "Precarious labour then and now: The British arts and crafts movement and cultural work revisited." Theorizing Cultural Work (Routledge, 2014) pp. 33–43 online.
- MacCarthy, Fiona (2009). "Morris, William (1834–1896), designer, author, and visionary socialist". Oxford Dictionary of National Biography (online ed.). Oxford University Press. doi:10.1093/ref:odnb/19322. (Subscription, Wikipedia Library access or UK public library membership required.)
- MacCarthy, Fiona (1994). William Morris. Faber and Faber. ISBN 0-571-17495-7.
- Mascia-Lees, Frances E. "American Beauty: The Middle Class Arts and Crafts Revival in the United States." in Critical Craft (Routledge, 2020) pp. 57–77.
- Meister, Maureen. Arts and Crafts Architecture: History and Heritage in New England (UP of New England, 2014).
- Naylor, Gillian (1971). The Arts and Crafts Movement: a study of its sources, ideals and influence on design theory. London: Studio Vista. ISBN 0-289-79580-X.
- Parry, Linda (2005). Textiles of the Arts and Crafts Movement. London: Thames and Hudson. ISBN 0-500-28536-5.
- Penick, Monica, Christopher Long, and Harry Ransom Center, eds. The rise of everyday design: The arts and crafts movement in Britain and America (Yale UP, 2019).
- Richardson, Margaret. Architects of the arts and crafts movement (1983)
- Tankard, Judith B. Gardens of the Arts and Crafts Movement (Timber Press, 2018)
- Teehan, Virginia; Heckett, Elizabeth (2005). The Honan Chapel: A Golden Vision. Cork: Cork University Press. ISBN 978-1-85918-346-5.
- Thomas, Zoë. "Between Art and Commerce: Women, Business Ownership, and the Arts and Crafts Movement." Past & Present 247.1 (2020): 151–196. online
- Triggs, Oscar Lovell. The arts & crafts movement (Parkstone International, 2014).
- Wildman, Stephen (1998). Edward Burne-Jones, Victorian artist-dreamer. New York: Metropolitan Museum of Art. ISBN 978-0-87099-858-4.
