= Arts and Crafts Essays =

Collection of essays published in 1893

Arts and Crafts Essays was an influential collection of essays on the decorative arts by the members of the Arts and Crafts Exhibition Society published in 1893. The preface was written by William Morris, and the essays were mostly catalogue introductions to exhibitions organised by the society. The contributors were leading figures in their fields, and helped to shape design and handicraft in a wide variety of fields. Many of the contributors were architects.

"The Arts and Crafts Exhibition Society has availed itself from the first of both lecture and essay, as well as the display of examples. Lectures and demonstrations were given during the progress of the Exhibitions, and essays written by well-known workers in the crafts of which they treated have accompanied the catalogues. These papers have now been collected together, and revised by their authors, and appear in book form under the editorship of Mr. William Morris, whose name has been practically associated with the revival of beauty in the arts and crafts of design in many ways before our Society came into existence, and who with his co-workers may be said to have been the pioneer of our English Renascence, which it is our earnest desire to foster and perpetuate." - Walter Crane

== The Essays ==
- Of the Revival of Design and Handicraft: with Notes on the Work of the Arts and Crafts Exhibition Society - Walter Crane
- Textiles - William Morris
- Of Decorative Painting and Design - Walter Crane
- Of Wall Papers - Walter Crane
- Fictiles - G.T. Robinson
- Metal Work - W.A.S. Benson
- Stone and Wood Carving - Somers Clarke
- Furniture - Stephen Webb
- Stained Glass - Somers Clarke
- Table Glass - Somers Clarke
- Printing - William Morris and Emery Walker
- Bookbinding - T. J. Cobden-Sanderson
- Of Mural Painting - Ford Madox Brown
- Of Sgraffito Work - Heywood Sumner
- Of Stucco and Gesso - G. T. Robinson
- Of Cast Iron - W.R. Lethaby
- Of Dyeing as an Art - William Morris
- Of Embroidery - May Morris
- Of Lace - Alan S. Cole
- Of Book Illustration and Book Decoration - Reginald Blomfield
- Of Designs and Working Drawings - Lewis F. Day
- Furniture and the Room - Edward S. Prior
- Of the Room and Furniture - Halsey Ricardo
- The English Tradition - Reginald Blomfield
- Carpenters' Furniture - W.R. Lethaby
- Of Decorated Furniture - J.H. Pollen
- Of Carving - Stephen Webb
- Intarsia and Inlaid Wood-Work - T.G. Jackson
- Woods and Other Materials - Stephen Webb
- Of Modern Embroidery - Mary E. Turner
- On Materials- May Morris
- Colour - May Morris
- Stitches and Mechanism - Alan S. Cole
- Design - John D. Sedding
- On Designing for the Art of Embroidery - Selwyn Image
