= Howell James & Co. =

London jewellers and silversmiths

Coordinates: 51°30′36.8″N 0°8′6.97″W

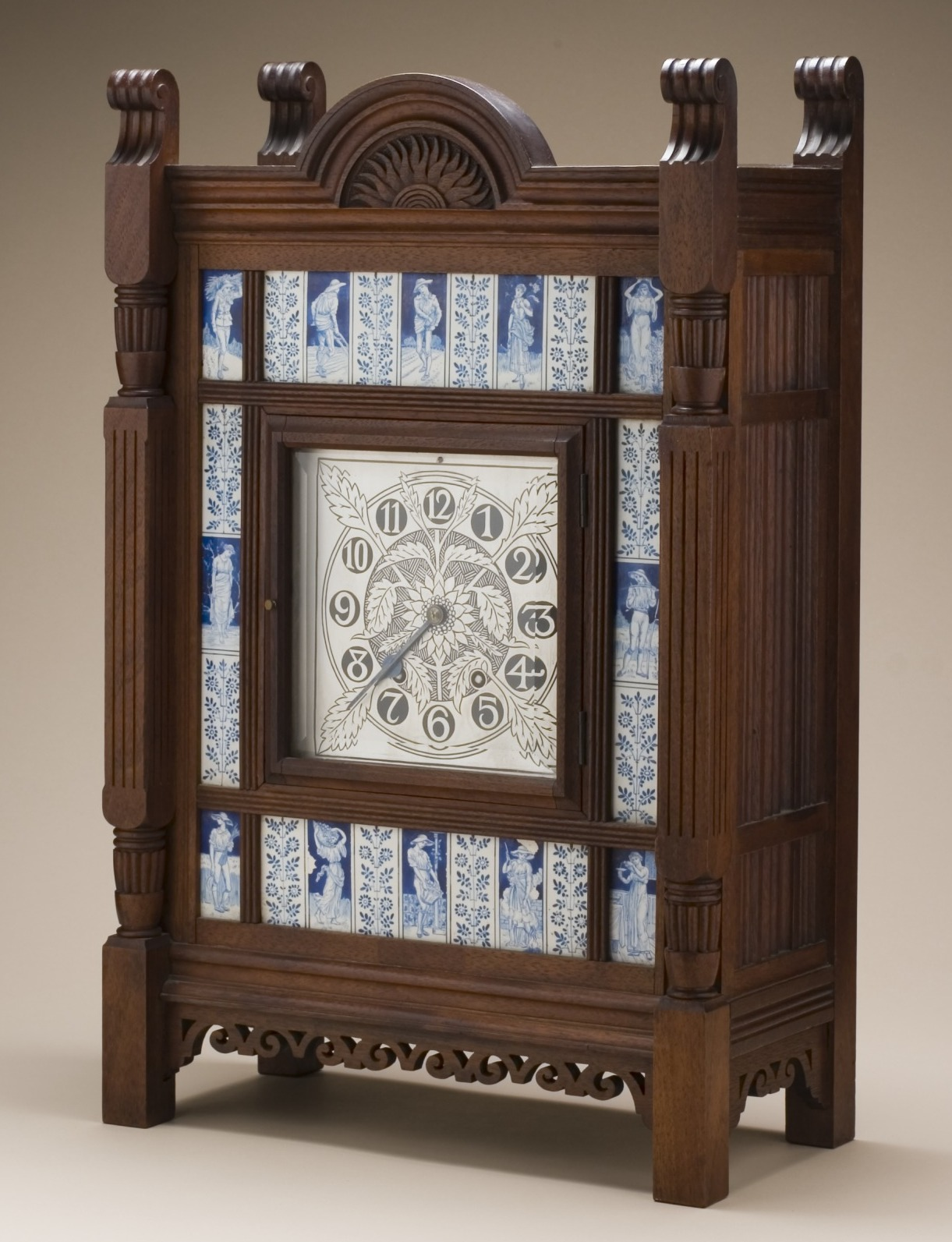
Aesthetic Movement clock by Lewis Foreman Day, c. 1878, Cherry case, ceramic and aluminum. LACMA

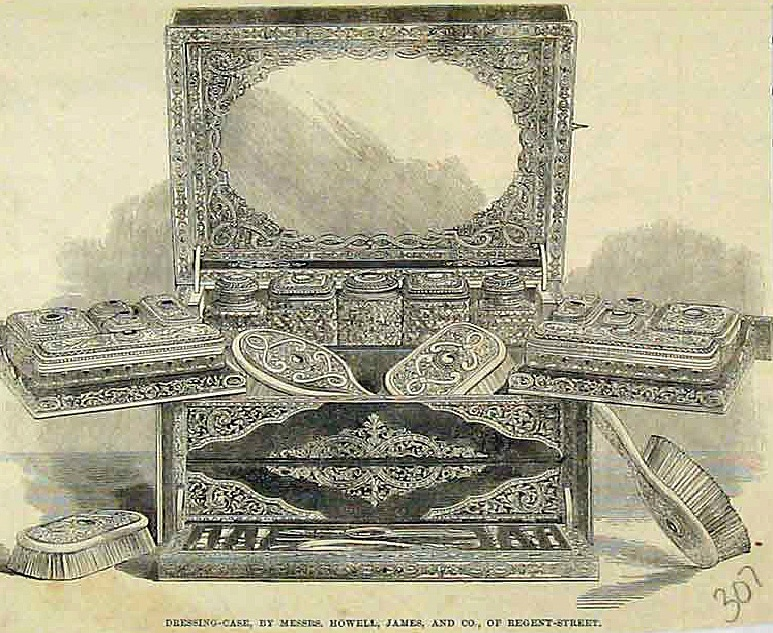
An illustration of a Howell James & Co. dressing case entered into the International Exhibition of 1862, in London

Howell James & Company was a firm of jewellers and silversmiths based in Regent Street in London which operated between 1819 and 1911. In 1876 they added galleries showing professional art pottery and the fashionable amateur china painting, and immediately became the main London venue for this.

It sold items by students and designers of the South Kensington School.

In 1884 the company became a limited company and their name changed to Howell & James Ltd.

== Notable items ==
An example of a Lewis Foreman Day clock, designed in about 1880, and made by Howell James & Co., with ebonised birch wood case and a porcelain face, is held by the Victoria and Albert Museum. The LACMA has a similar example, shown above.
