= Rowland Carter =

Architect, surveyor, insurance agent, and auctioneer

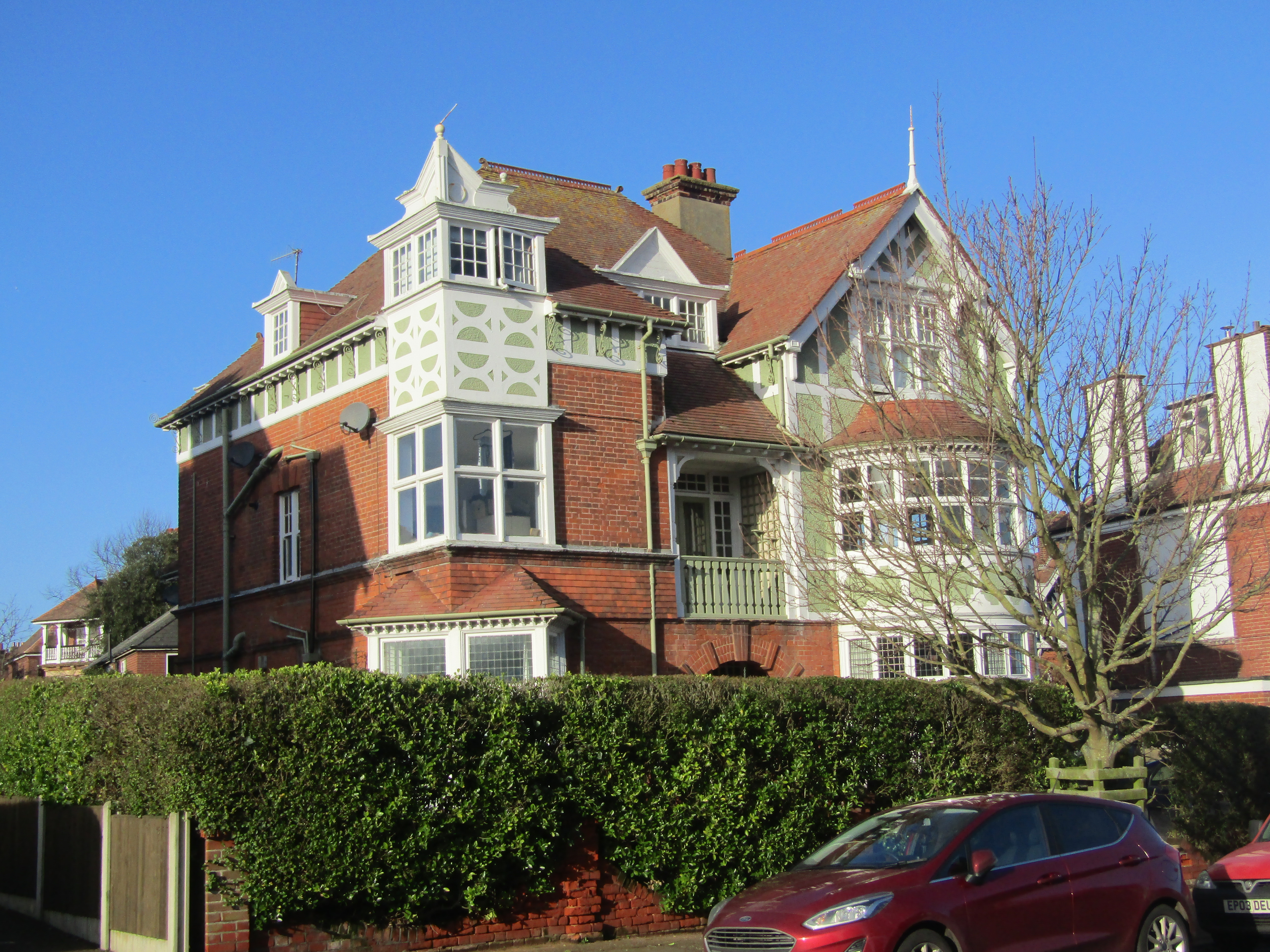
Wood Dene house, designed by the Rowland Carter.

Rowland Wilfred William Carter (1875–1916) was an architect, surveyor, insurance agent and auctioneer. He designed and built Arts and Crafts style buildings in Cromer and wider North Norfolk area. His studio was located at Priory House, Church Street.

== Works ==
Commercial

- 1898 Double faced shop premises at 7 Bond Street.

Public

Private

- 1901 Wood Dene in Cliff Avenue
- 1899 9 Bernard Road. Half timbered Villa
- 1901 Beach Road
