= Arts and Crafts Exhibition Society =

Exhibition Society in London

- Formation: 1887; 139 years ago
- Dissolved: 1960, when it merged with the Cambridgeshire Guild of Craftsmen
- Type: Craft organisation
- Purpose: To promote the exhibition of decorative arts alongside fine arts
- Headquarters: New Gallery, London
- Region served: UK
- Leader: Walter Crane

The Arts and Crafts Exhibition Society was formed in London in 1887 to promote the exhibition of decorative arts alongside fine arts. The Society's exhibitions were held annually at the New Gallery from 1888 to 1890, and roughly every three years thereafter, were important in the flowering of the British Arts and Crafts Movement in the decades prior to World War I.

== History ==
The illustrator and designer Walter Crane served as the founding president of the Society for its first three years. Of its goals and purposes, he wrote:

We desired first of all to give opportunity to the designer and craftsman to exhibit their work to the public for its artistic interest and thus to assert the claims of decorative art and handicraft to attention equally with the painter of easel pictures, hitherto almost exclusively associated with the term art in the public mind. Ignoring the artificial distinction between Fine and Decorative art, we felt that the real distinction was what we conceived to be between good and bad art, or false and true taste and methods in handicraft, considering it of little value to endeavour to classify art according to its commercial value or social importance, while everything depended upon the spirit as well as the skill and fidelity with which the conception was expressed, in whatever material, seeing that a worker earned the title of artist by the sympathy with and treatment of his material, by due recognition of its capacity, and its natural limitations, as well as of the relation of the work to use and life.

Annual exhibitions were held at the New Gallery in 1888, 1889, and 1890, but the third exhibition failed to match the quality of the first two, and was a financial disaster. William Morris succeeded Crane as president in 1891., and the Society thereafter chose to reduce the frequency of showings in order to ensure an abundance of materials to display.

The Society published Arts and Crafts Essays, an influential collection of essays on the decorative arts by its members, in 1893. Contributors included Morris, Crane, T. J. Cobden-Sanderson, Ford Madox Brown, and May Morris.

The fourth exhibition, held in 1893, was far more successful, and the fifth exhibition of 1896—although clouded by the death of William Morris on its planned opening day—proved to be its most influential. The 1899 exhibit featured a Morris retrospective. Another successful exhibition was held in 1903, but the Society suffered organizational problems in the new century, with the exhibitions of 1906, 1910, 1912 and 1916 each being held in a different location. Crane died in 1915, and architect and designer Henry Wilson was president from 1915 to 1922, but the exhibitions failed to recover the critical and artistic success of the 1890s. In 1915, W. R. Lethaby and other members, recognising the limitations of the Society's devotion to craft methods of production, set up the Design and Industries Association to improve the standards of British industrial design.

In the 1930s it became clear to some members that if the Society was to survive in any form it had to confront the role of the crafts in relation to industry and the place of machinery in craft production. The Society's 1935 exhibition introduced a section devoted to mass-produced articles designed by craftsmen to demonstrate the influence the crafts could have on industry, which brought its exhibitions to the notice of the press again. This move was controversial within the Society and led to some resignations.

The Society continued to exhibit periodically until the 1950s and many eminent craftsmen and women were associated with it. In 1960, it merged with the Cambridgeshire Guild of Craftsmen to form the Society of Designer Craftsmen, which is still active.

== See also ==
- Mary Elizabeth Turner (1854–1907). English embroiderer
