= Merton Abbey =

Merton Abbey may refer to:

- Merton Priory, a former Augustinian priory in what is now southwest London, England.
- Merton Abbey Mills, a former textile factory in the parish of Merton near the site of the medieval Merton Priory
- Merton Abbey Works, a former factory used by Morris & Co. from 1880 to 1940.
- Merton Abbey railway station, a former railway station in London which closed in 1929.
