= Tristram and Isoude stained glass panels =

1862 stained-glass windows in England

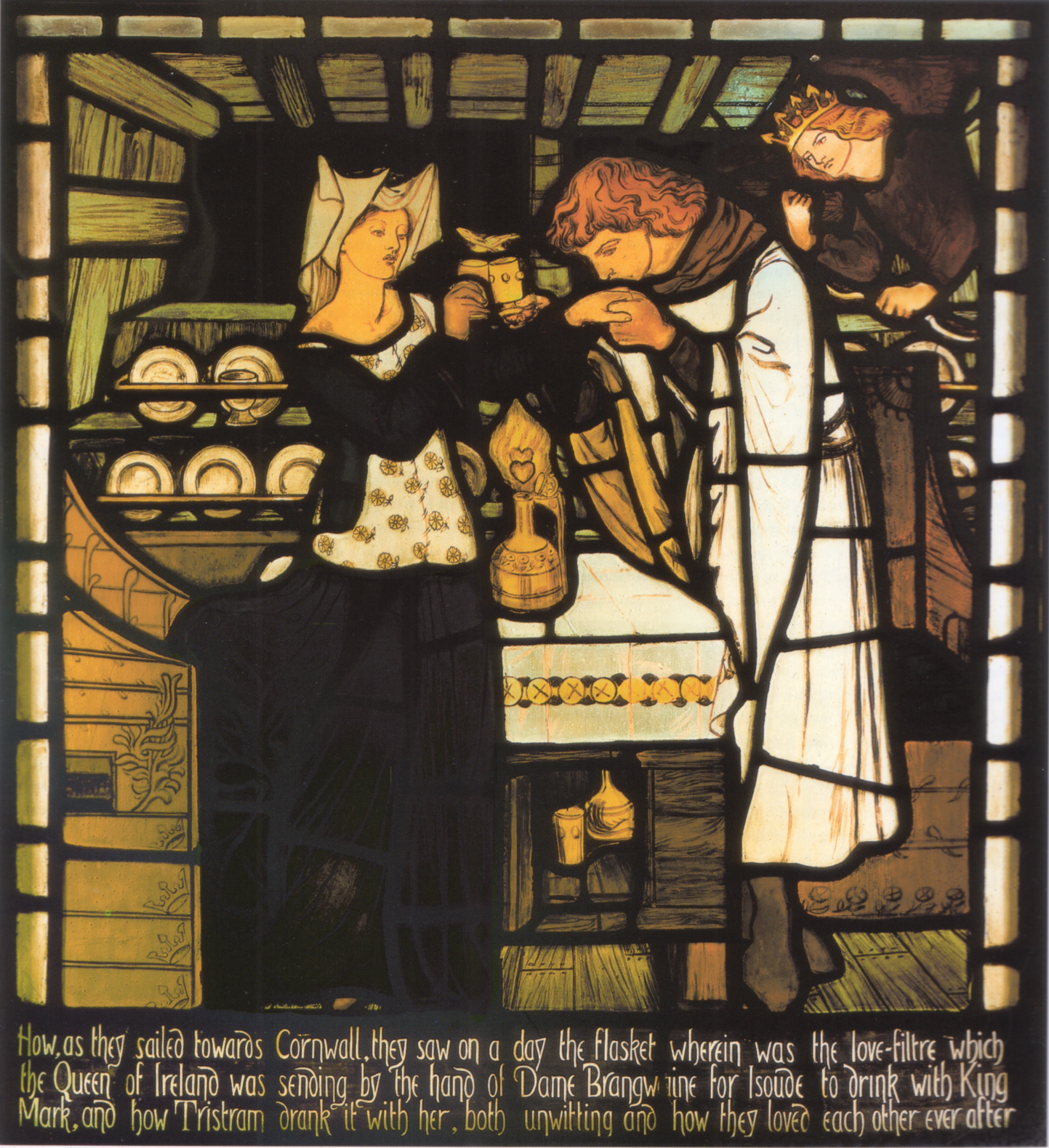
Sir Tristram and la Belle Ysoude drink the potion, Morris, Marshall, Faulkner & Co., 1862, after a design by Dante Gabriel Rossetti. Bradford Art Galleries and Museums.

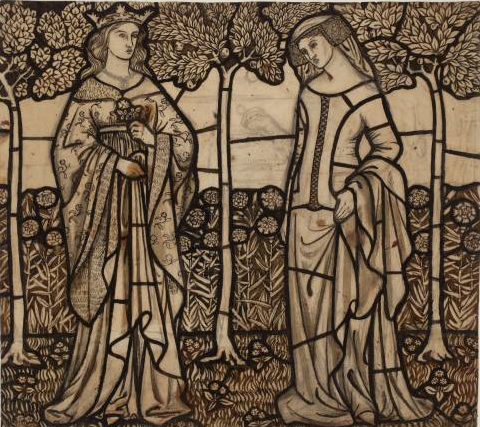
Cartoon for Queen Guenevere and Isoude Les Blanches Mains, William Morris, 1862. Tate Britain, London.

The Tristram and Isoude stained glass panels are a series of 13 small stained-glass windows made in 1862 by Morris, Marshall, Faulker & Co. for Harden Grange, the house of textile merchant Walter Dunlop, near Bingley in Yorkshire, England. Depicting the legend of Tristan and Iseult, they were designed by six of the leading Pre-Raphaelite artists of the day, to an overall design by William Morris. They were acquired in 1917 by Cartwright Hall Art Gallery, which is now part of Bradford Museums & Galleries. They can be seen on display at Cliffe Castle, Keighley.

== Details ==
The 13 small stained-glass panels depict scenes from the story of Sir Tristram and la Belle Isoude as told in Sir Thomas Malory's Morte d'Arthur. They were commissioned by Walter Dunlop, a Bradford textile merchant, for a new music room to be built at Harden Grange, his house near Bingley, Yorkshire, and were designed and executed in 1862 by Morris, Marshall, Faulker & Co., the decorative arts firm established the year before by the Pre-Raphaelite artist William Morris in partnership with Dante Gabriel Rossetti, Edward Burne-Jones, Ford Madox Brown, Philip Webb, Charles Faulkner and Peter Paul Marshall.

This was the firm's first commission for windows for a private residence, or with a non-ecclesiastical subject, and Morris provided Dunlop with a hand-written programme for the proposed work headed "Short abstract of the Romance of Tristram", with marginal annotations suggesting the pictorial possibilities of the story.

To design the cartoons or preparatory drawings for the individual panels, Morris turned to four of the artists who had worked with him in 1857 on another project based on the Arthurian legend as retold by Malory, the Oxford Union murals—Rossetti, Burne-Jones, Val Prinsep and Arthur Hughes—plus his partner Ford Madox Brown. Morris himself designed four of the 13 panels and maintained the cohesiveness of the series through his overall design, matching text blocks, placement of the lead lines, and selection of colours, including deep ruby-reds and olive greens.

The subjects of the 13 panels and their designers are:

1. The Birth of Sir Tristram (Hughes)
2. The Fight between Sir Tristram and Sir Marhaus (Rossetti)
3. The Departure of Tristram and Isoude from Ireland (Prinsep)
4. Tristram and Isoude drink the Love Potion (Rossetti)
5. The Marriage of Tristram and Isoude Les Blanches Mains (Burne-Jones)
6. The Madness of Tristram (Burne-Jones)
7. The Attempted Suicide of La Belle Isoude (Burne-Jones)
8. The Recognition of Tristram by La Belle Isoude (Burne-Jones)
9. At the Court of King Arthur (Morris)
10. King Mark slays Tristram (Brown)
11. The Tomb of Tristram and Isoude (Burne-Jones)
12. Queen Guenevere and Isoude Les Blanches Mains (Morris)
13. King Arthur and Sir Launcelot (Morris)

The Tristram and Isoude windows were acquired by the Bradford Art Gallery in 1917, along with documentation relating to the subject matter of the panels and their installation, including the "Short abstract". They can be seen on display at Cliffe Castle, Keighley.
