= Morris & Co. =

Decorative arts firm founded by William Morris

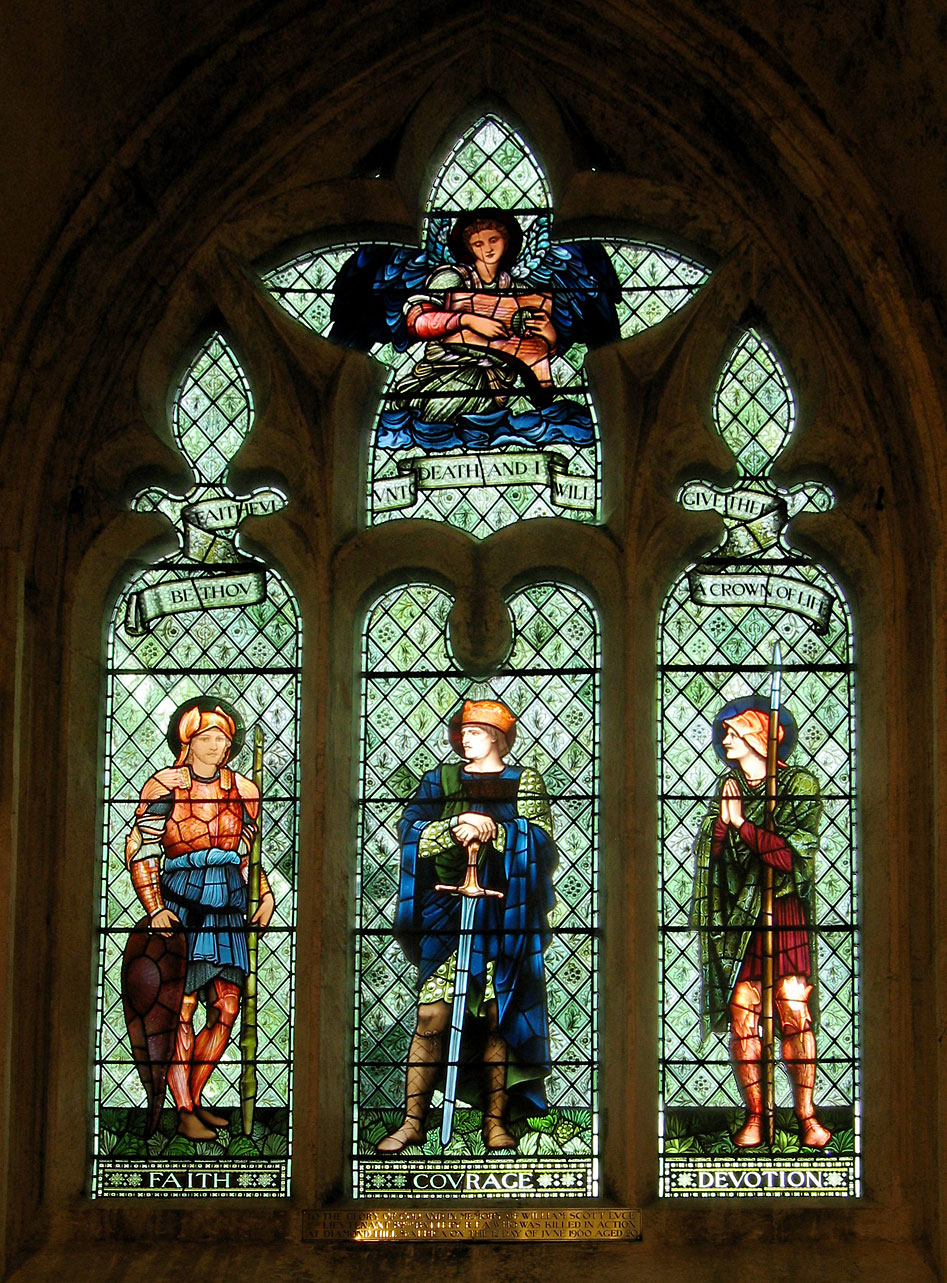
A Morris & Co. stained-glass window to a design by Edward Burne-Jones installed in Malmesbury Abbey. The window shows characteristic themes based on Arthurian legends.

Morris, Marshall, Faulkner & Co. (1861–1875) was a furnishings and decorative arts manufacturer and retailer founded by the artist and designer William Morris with friends from the Pre-Raphaelites. With its successor Morris & Co. (1875–1940) the firm's medieval-inspired aesthetic and respect for hand-craftsmanship and traditional textile arts had a profound influence on the decoration of churches and houses into the early 20th century.

Although its most influential period was during the flourishing of the Arts and Crafts Movement in the 1880s and 1890s, Morris & Co. remained in operation in a limited fashion from World War I until its closure in 1940. The firm's designs are still sold today under licences given to Sanderson & Sons, part of the Walker Greenbank wallpaper and fabrics business (which owns the "Morris & Co." brand,) and to Liberty of London.

== Early years ==
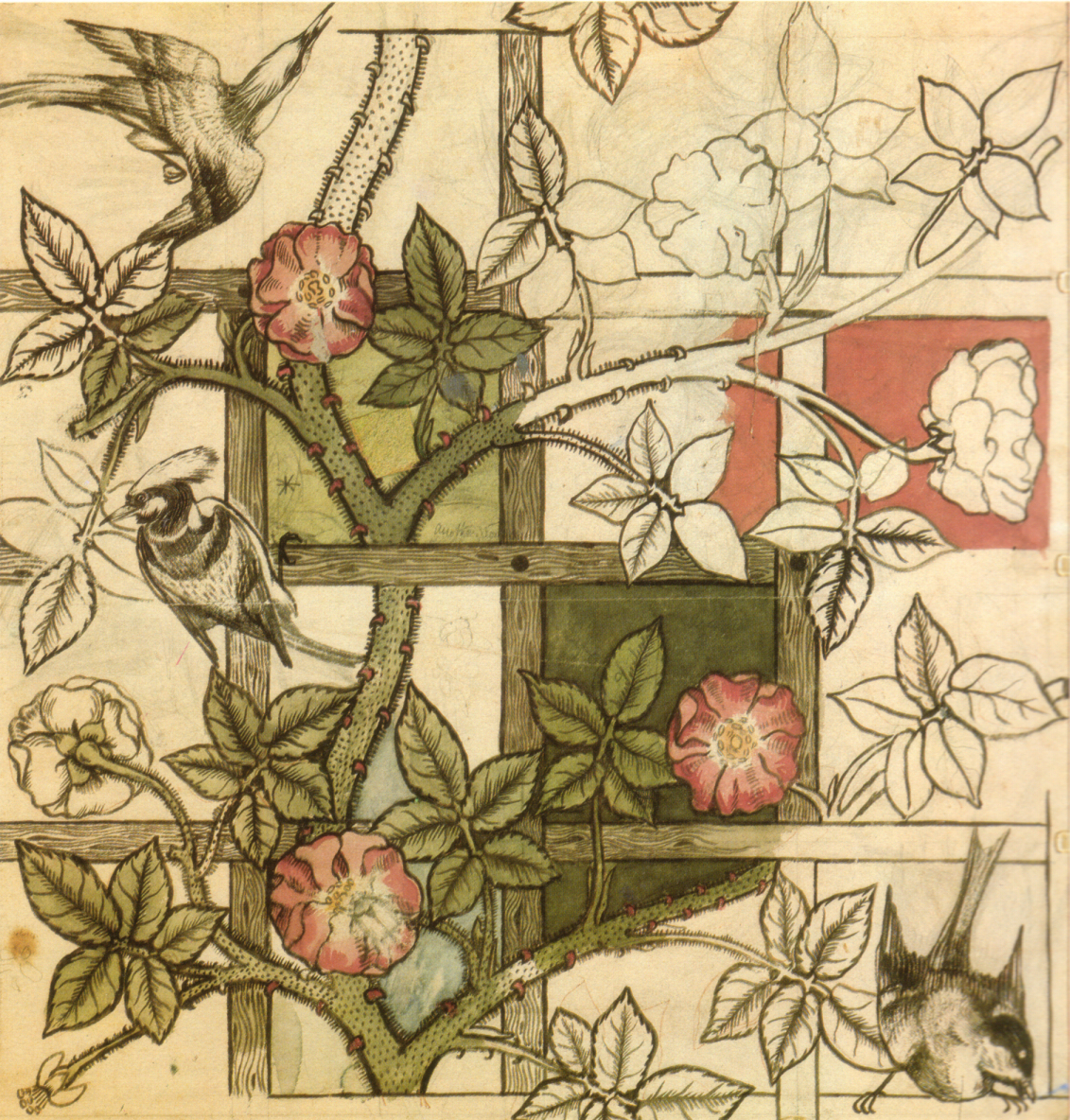
Design for Trellis wallpaper, 1862

Morris, Marshall, Faulkner & Co., "Fine Art Workmen in Painting, Carving, Furniture and the Metals", was jointly created by Morris, Ford Madox Brown, Edward Burne-Jones, Charles Faulkner, Dante Gabriel Rossetti, P. P. Marshall, and Philip Webb in 1861 to create and sell medieval-inspired, handcrafted items for the home. The prospectus set forth that the firm would undertake carving, stained glass, metal-work, paper-hangings, chintzes (printed fabrics), and carpets. The first headquarters of the firm were at 8 Red Lion Square in London.

The work shown by the firm at the 1862 International Exhibition attracted much notice, and within a few years it was flourishing. In the autumn of 1864, a severe illness obliged Morris to choose between giving up his home at Red House in Kent and giving up his work in London. With great reluctance he gave up Red House, and in 1865 established himself under the same roof with his workshops, which by then had relocated to larger premises in Queen Square, Bloomsbury.

The decoration of churches was from the first an important part of the business. A great wave of church-building and remodelling by the Church of England in the 1840s and 1850s increased the demand for ecclesiastical decoration of all kinds, especially stained glass. But this market shrank in the general depression of the later 1860s, and the firm increasingly turned to secular commissions. On its non-ecclesiastical side, the product line was extended to include, besides painted windows and mural decoration, furniture, metal and glass wares, cloth and paper wall-hangings, embroideries, jewellery, woven and knotted carpets, silk damasks, and tapestries.

Morris was producing repeating patterns for wallpaper as early as 1862, and some six years later he designed his first pattern specifically for fabric printing. As in so many other areas that interested him, Morris chose to work with the ancient technique of hand woodblock printing in preference to the roller printing which had almost completely replaced it for commercial uses.

== Reorganization and expansion ==
In August 1874, Morris determined to restructure the partnership, generating a dispute with Marshall, Rossetti, and Madox Brown over the return on their shares. The company was dissolved and reorganized under Morris's sole ownership as Morris & Co. on 31 March 1875.

During these years, Morris took up the practical art of dyeing as a necessary adjunct of his manufacturing business. He spent much of his time at the Staffordshire dye works of Thomas Wardle, mastering the processes of that art and making experiments in the revival of old or discovery of new methods. One result of these experiments was to reinstate indigo dyeing as a practical industry, and generally to renew the use of those vegetable dyes, like madder, which had been driven almost out of use by the anilines.

Dyeing of wools, silks, and cottons was the necessary preliminary to what he had much at heart, the production of woven and printed fabrics of the highest excellence; and the period of incessant work at the dye-vat (1875–76) was followed by a period during which he was absorbed in the production of textiles (1877–78), and more especially in the revival of carpet-weaving as a fine art.

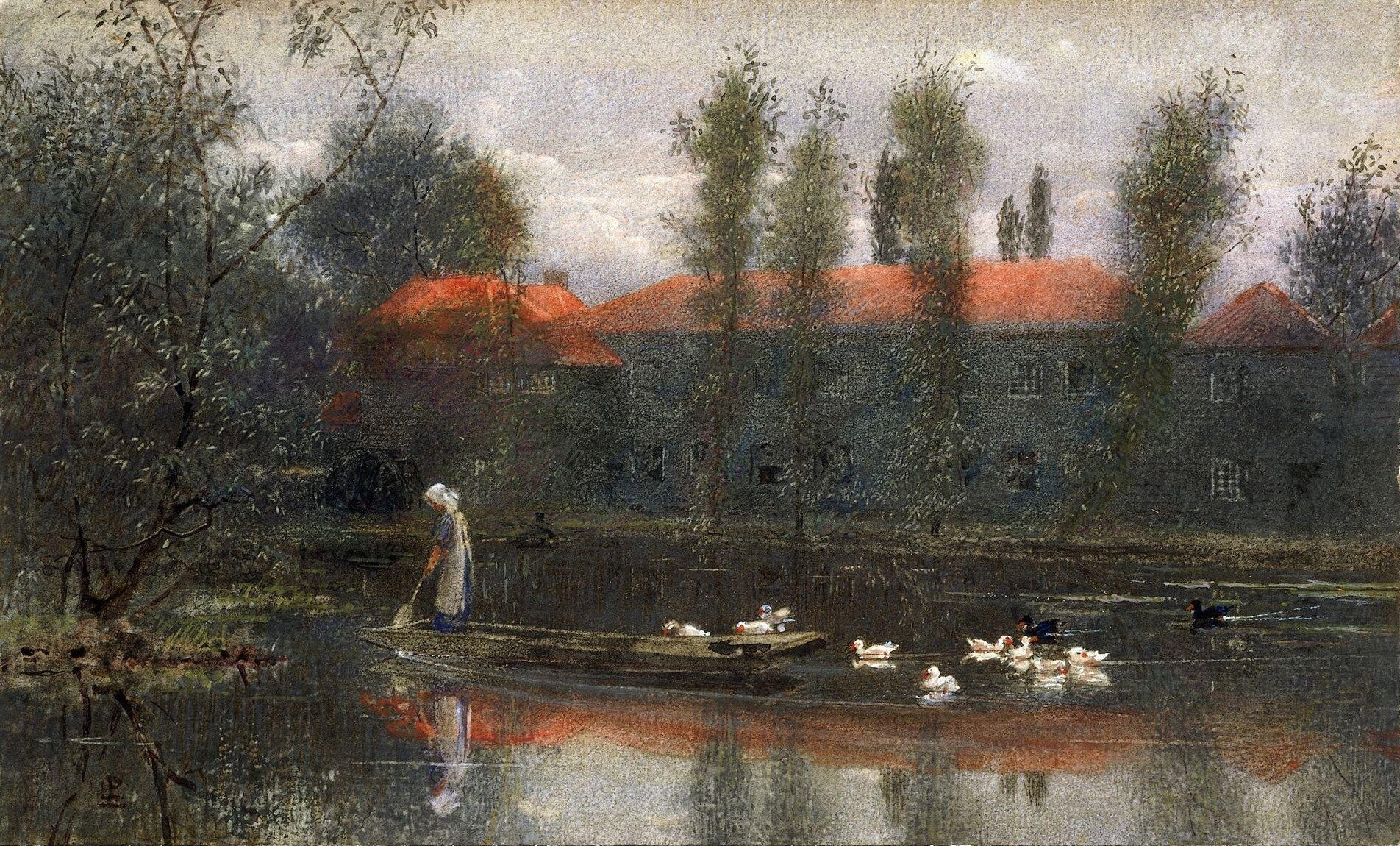
The Pond at Merton Abbey by Lexden Lewis Pocock is an idyllic representation of the works in the time of William Morris.

In June 1881, Morris relocated his dyeworks from Queen Square to the Merton Abbey Works, an historic calico-printing works on the River Wandle, after determining the river's water was suitable for dyeing. The complex, on 7 acres (28,000 m^{2}), included several buildings and a dyeworks, and the various buildings were soon adapted for stained-glass, textile printing, and fabric- and carpet-weaving.

In 1879, Morris had taught himself tapestry weaving in the medieval style and set up a tapestry workshop with his apprentice John Henry Dearle at Queen Square. Dearle executed Morris and Co.'s first figural tapestry from a design by Walter Crane in 1883. Dearle was soon responsible for the training of all tapestry apprentices in the expanded workshop at Merton Abbey, and partnered with Morris on designing details such as fabric patterns and floral backgrounds for tapestries based on figure drawings or cartoons by Burne-Jones (some of them repurposed from stained glass cartoons). and animal figures by Philip Webb. Suites of tapestries were made as part of whole-house decorating schemes, and tapestries of Burne-Jones angels and scenes from the Arthurian legends were a staple of Morris & Co. into the twentieth century.

== Important commissions ==
The firm's first commissions—stained glass and decorative schemes for St Michael's Church, Brighton, All Saints Church, Selsley, and Jesus Chapel, Cambridge—came from the architect G F Bodley in the early 1860s. Following this, two significant secular commissions helped to establish the firm's reputation in the late 1860s: a royal project at St. James's Palace and the "green dining room" at the South Kensington Museum (now the Victoria and Albert Museum) of 1867. The green dining room (preserved as the Morris Room at the V&A) featured stained glass windows and panel figures by Burne-Jones, panels with branches of fruit and flowers by Morris, and olive branches and a frieze by Philip Webb. The St. James's commission comprised decorative schemes for the Armoury and the Tapestry Room, and included panels of stylized floral patterns painted on ceilings, cornices, dadoes, windows, and doors.

In 1871, Morris & Co. were responsible for the windows at All Saints church in the village of Wilden near to Stourport-on-Severn. They were designed by Burne-Jones for Alfred Baldwin, his wife's brother-in-law.

Standen near East Grinstead, West Sussex, was designed between 1892 and 1894 by Philip Webb for a prosperous London solicitor, James Beale, his wife Margaret, and their family. It is decorated with Morris carpets, fabrics and wallpapers.

In the 21st century, the State Hermitage Museum (St. Petersburg, Russia) curators made a sensational discovery: in 1895, Morris & Co supplied the "Garden Tulip" wallpaper to Emperor Nicholas II for his private rooms in the Imperial Winter Palace. This was one of William Morris's last court commissions before his death. The authors of the first article in 2004, Maria Khaltunen and Rifat Gafifullin, established this fact based on archival materials. But in 2016-2017, Nicholas Onegin continued and significantly expanded the research: together with Walker Greenbank PLC's staff, they visited William Morris's archives and factory, where they found authentic printing blocks from the 1880s used to create the wallpaper for Nicholas II. Thanks to this research, the exact article number of the wallpaper and its color scheme were determined. The results of this unique study were published by Nicholas Onegin in scientific articles in various journals (in Russian and English languages) and on television programs featuring Dr. Onegin. In 2025, at the "Morris Mania" exhibition in William Morris Gallery in London, the Winter Palace wallpaper story (based on Nicholas Onegin's articles) gained even wider publicity.

Stanmore Hall was the last major decorating commission executed by Morris & Co. before Morris's death in 1896. It was also the most extensive commission undertaken by the firm, and included a series of tapestries based on the story of the Holy Grail for the dining room, to which Morris devoted his energies, the rest of the work being executed under the direction of Dearle.

Other Morris & Co. commissions include the ceiling within the dining room of Charleville Forest Castle, Ireland; interiors of Bullers Wood House, now Bullers Wood School in Chislehurst, Kent; and stained glass windows at Adcote.

== Last stages ==
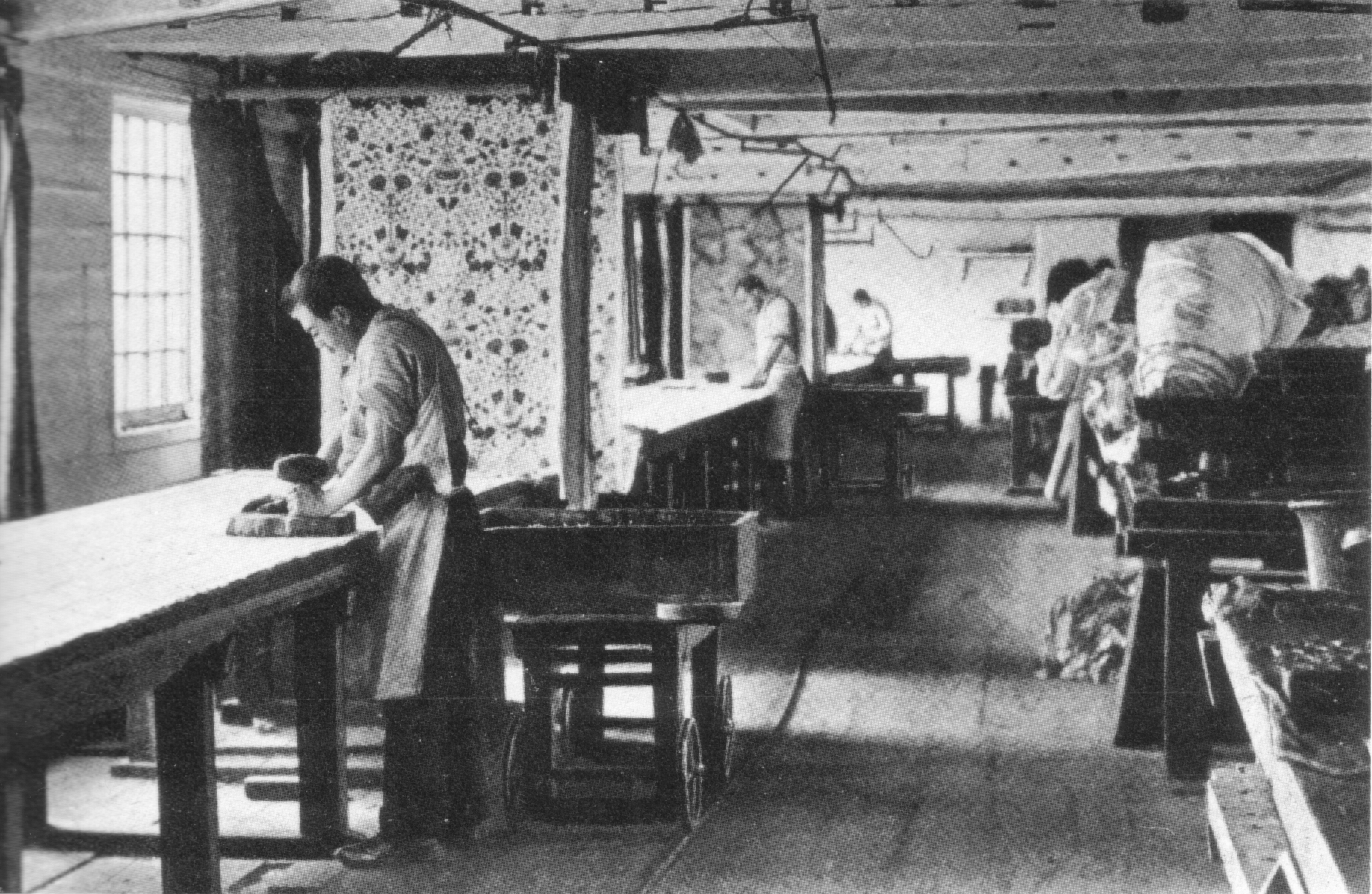
Textile printing at Merton Abbey (c. 1890), from a booklet commemorating the 50th anniversary of the firm, 1911.

As Morris pursued other interests, notably socialism and the Kelmscott Press, day-to-day work at the firm was delegated. Morris's daughter May became the director of the embroidery department in 1885, when she was in her early twenties. Dearle, who had begun designing repeating patterns for wallpapers and textiles in the late 1880s, was head designer for the firm by 1890, handling interior design commissions and supervising the tapestry, weaving, and fabric-printing departments at Merton Abbey.

Dearle's contributions to textile design were long overshadowed by Morris. Dearle exhibited his designs under the Morris name rather than his own in the Arts and Crafts Exhibitions and the major Morris retrospective of 1899,. Even today many Dearle designs, and others created by designers working at the firm, May Morris and Kathleen Kersey among them, are popularly offered as "William Morris" patterns.

On Morris's death in 1896, Dearle became the art director of the firm, which changed its name again, to Morris & Co. Decorators Ltd., in 1905. The company was still making good-quality stained glass into the 1920s: Holy Trinity Church, Elsecar, has several Morris & Co. windows dated 1922. Dearle managed the company's textile works at Merton Abbey until his own death in 1932. The firm was finally dissolved in the early months of World War II.

== Offerings ==
=== Stained glass ===
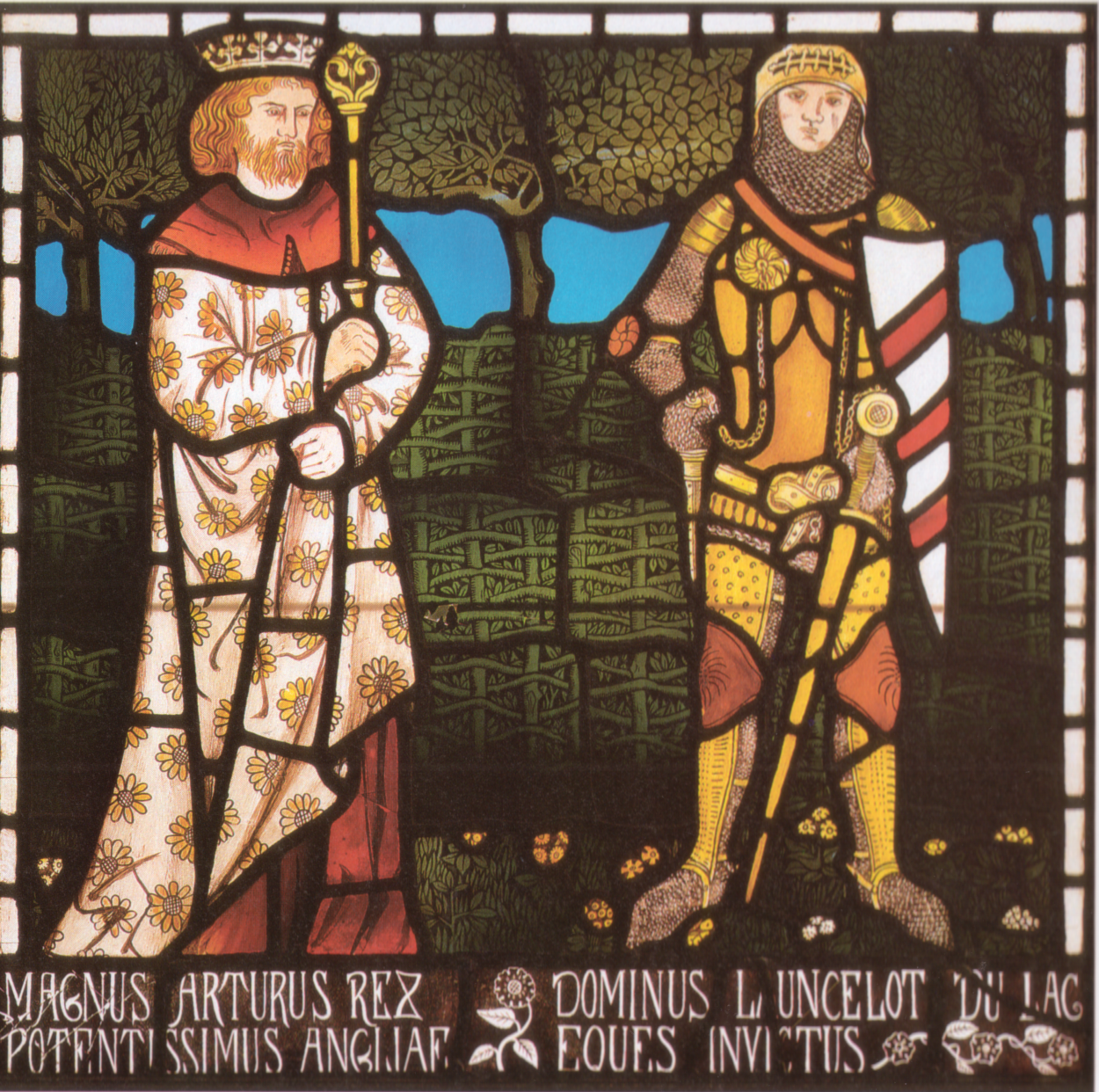
King Arthur and Sir Lancelot, from the Tristram and Isoude stained glass panels, designed by William Morris (1862)

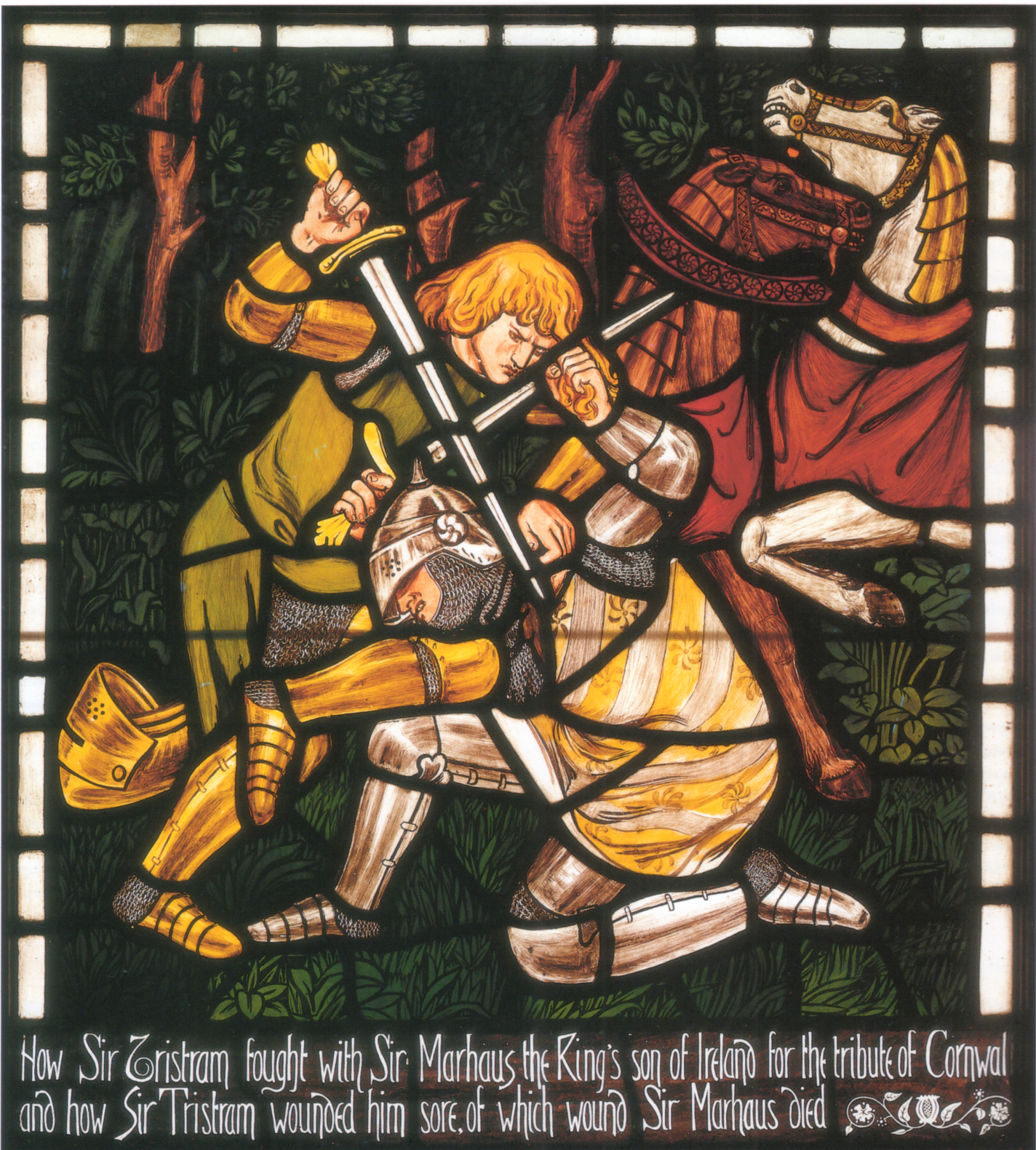
The Fight between Tristram and Sir Marhaus from the Tristam and Isoude series, designed Dante Gabriel Rossetti (1862)

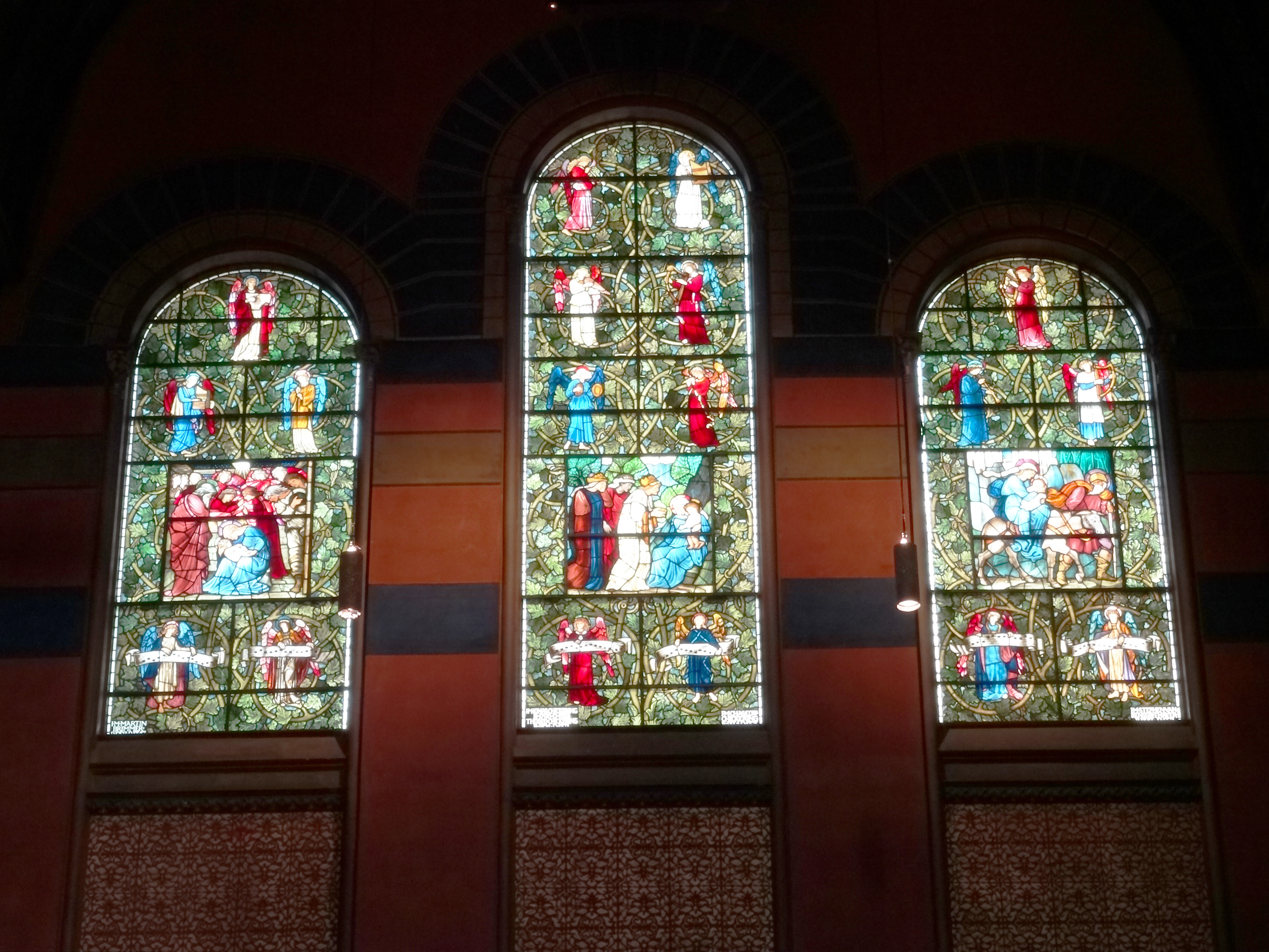
Edward Burne-Jones and William Morris' Nativity windows (1882)

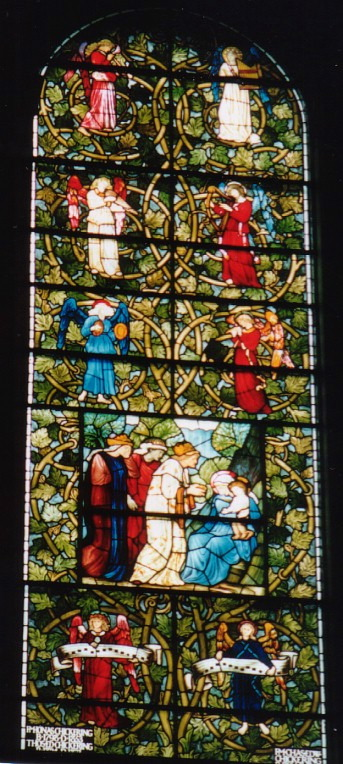
Edward Burne-Jones and William Morris' The Worship of the Magi window (1882)

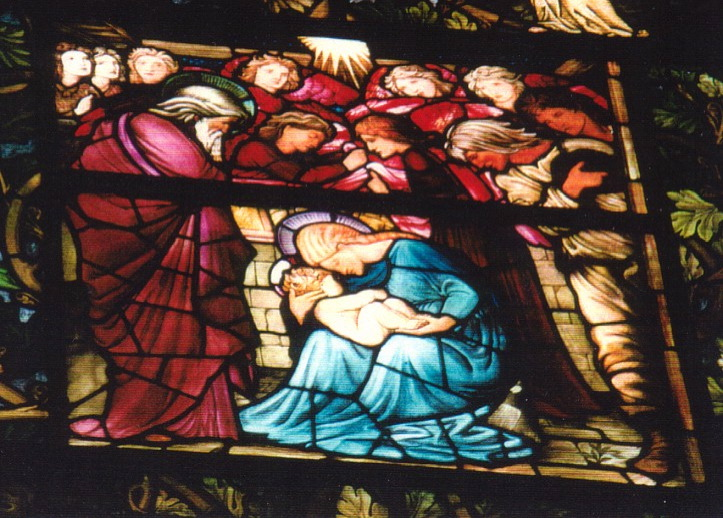
Edward Burne-Jones and William Morris' The Worship of the Shepherds window (1882)

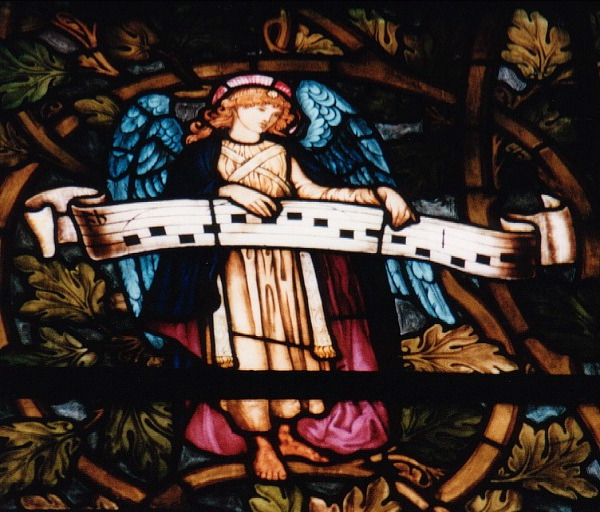
Detail from Edward Burne-Jones and William Morris' The Worship of the Shepherds window (1882)

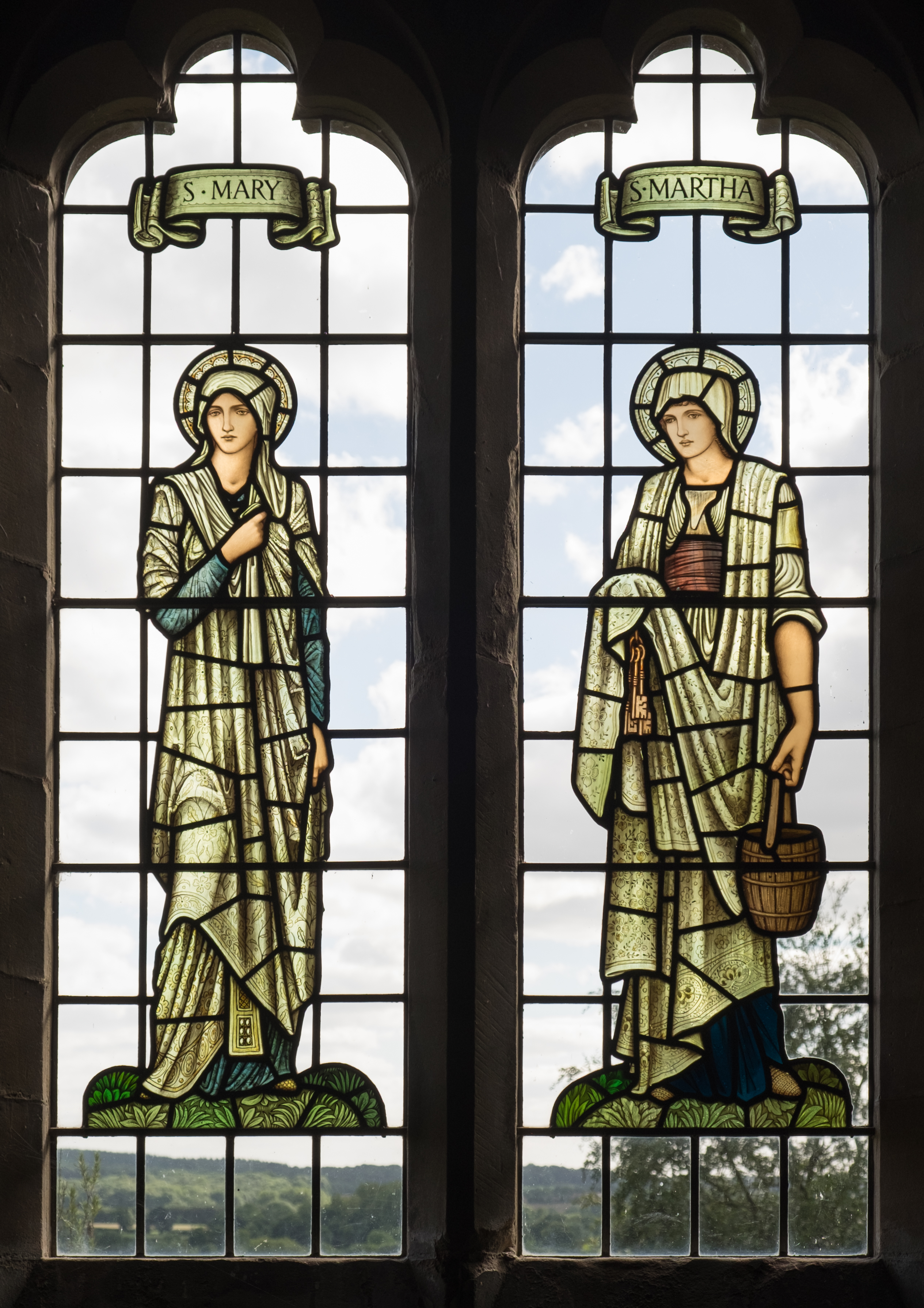
Mary and Martha by Edward Burne-Jones in All Saints, Preston Bagot

=== Printed textiles and wallpapers ===
Morris & Co. repeating patterns were occasionally offered as both block-printed wallpapers and fabric during Morris's lifetime; many of the patterns still available are offered in both forms by their current manufacturers.

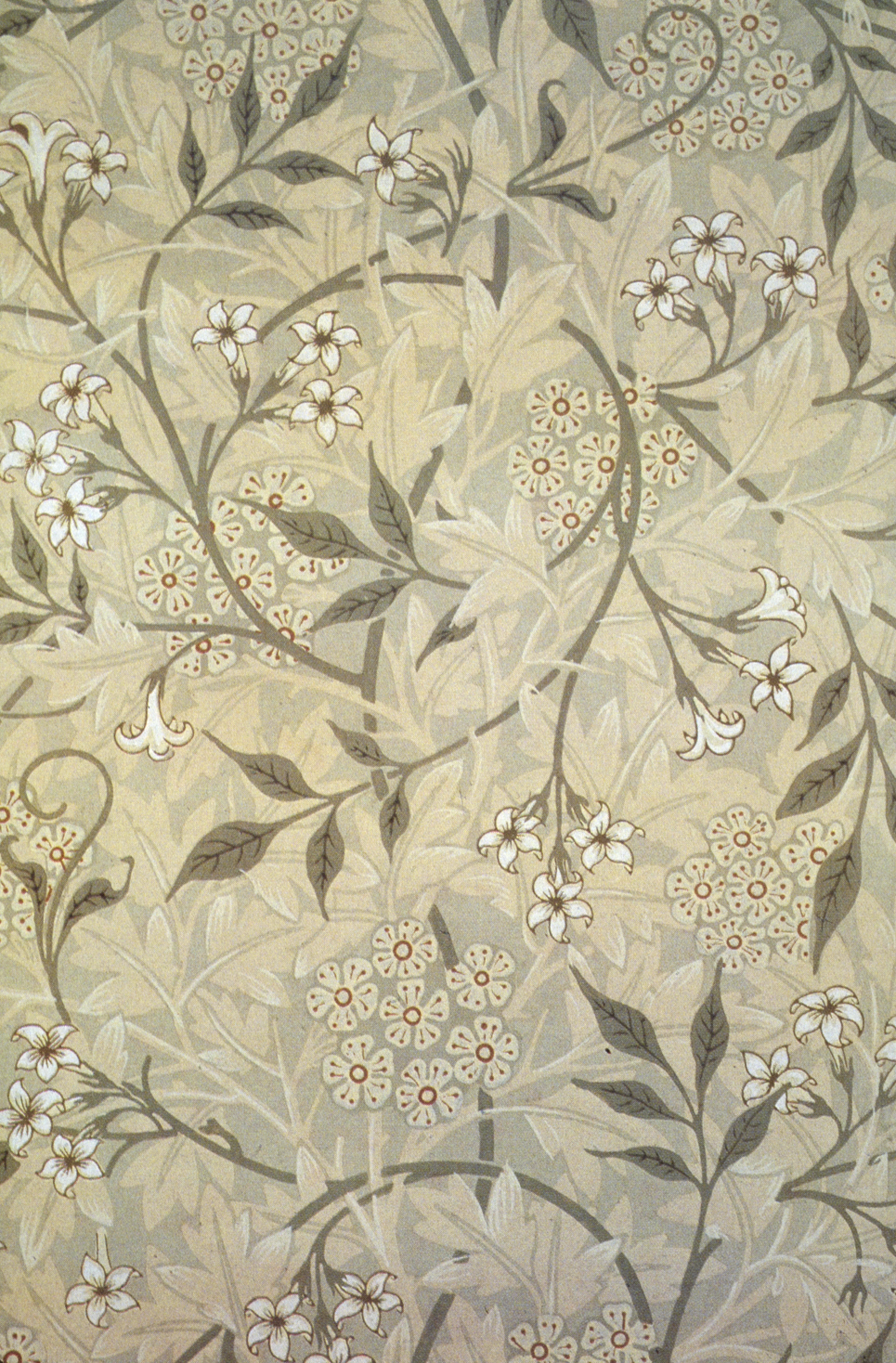
Jasmine wallpaper, designed by Morris 1872

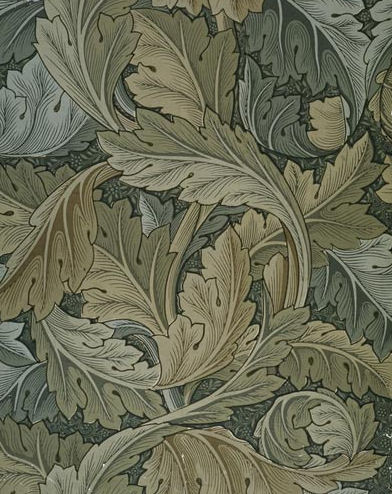
Acanthus wallpaper, designed by Morris 1875

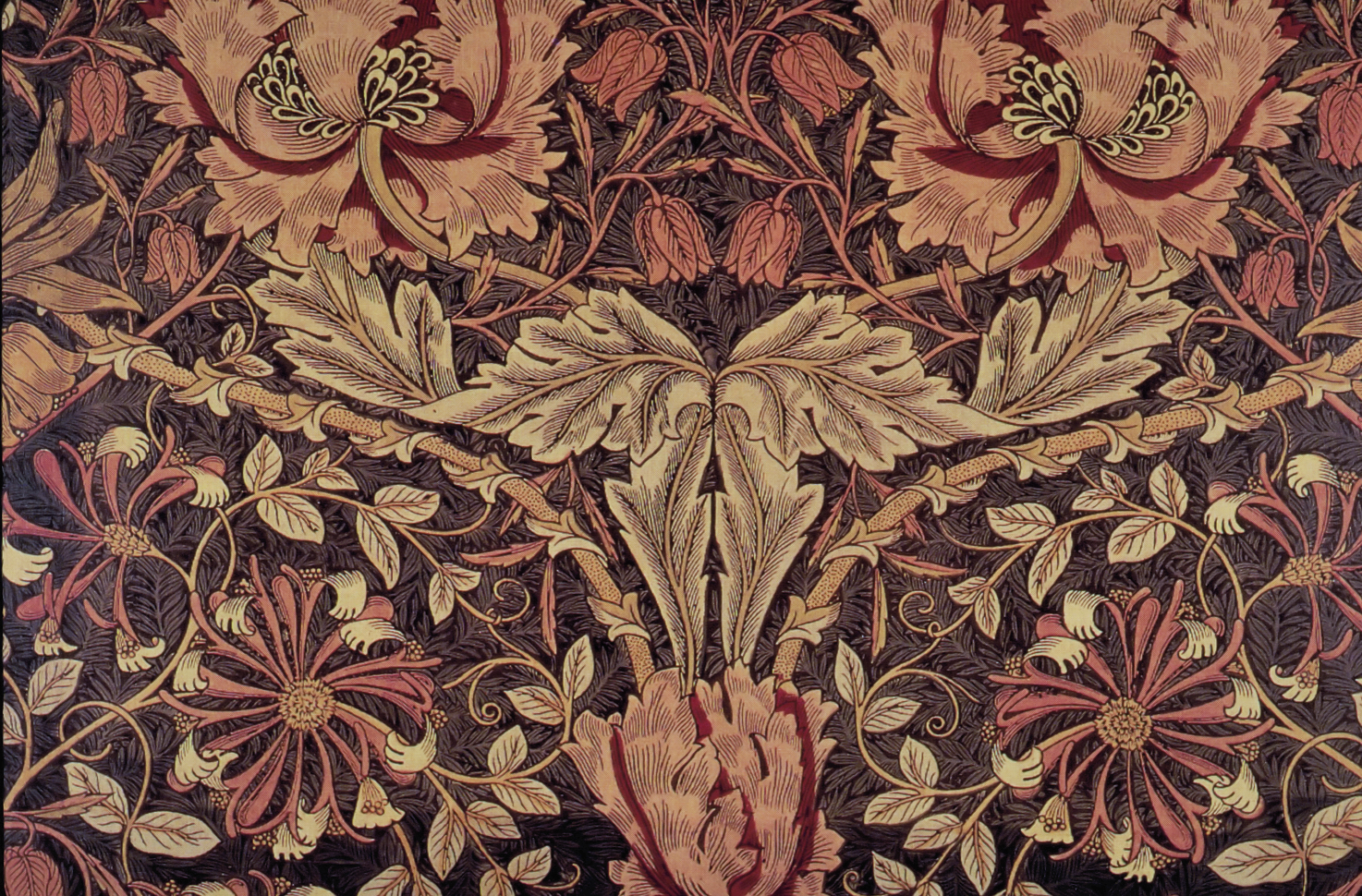
Honeysuckle fabric, designed by Morris 1876

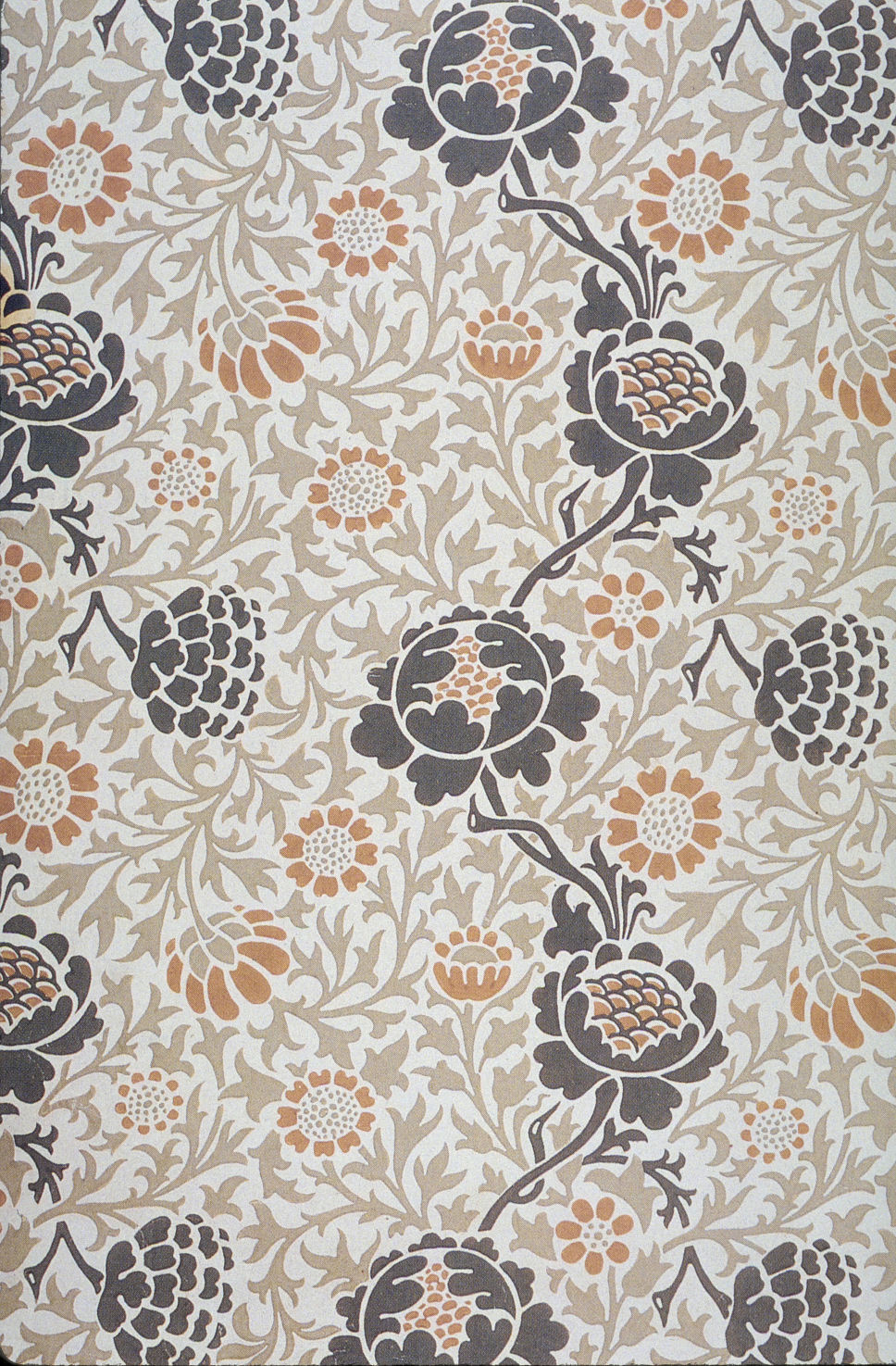
Grafton wallpaper, Morris, 1883

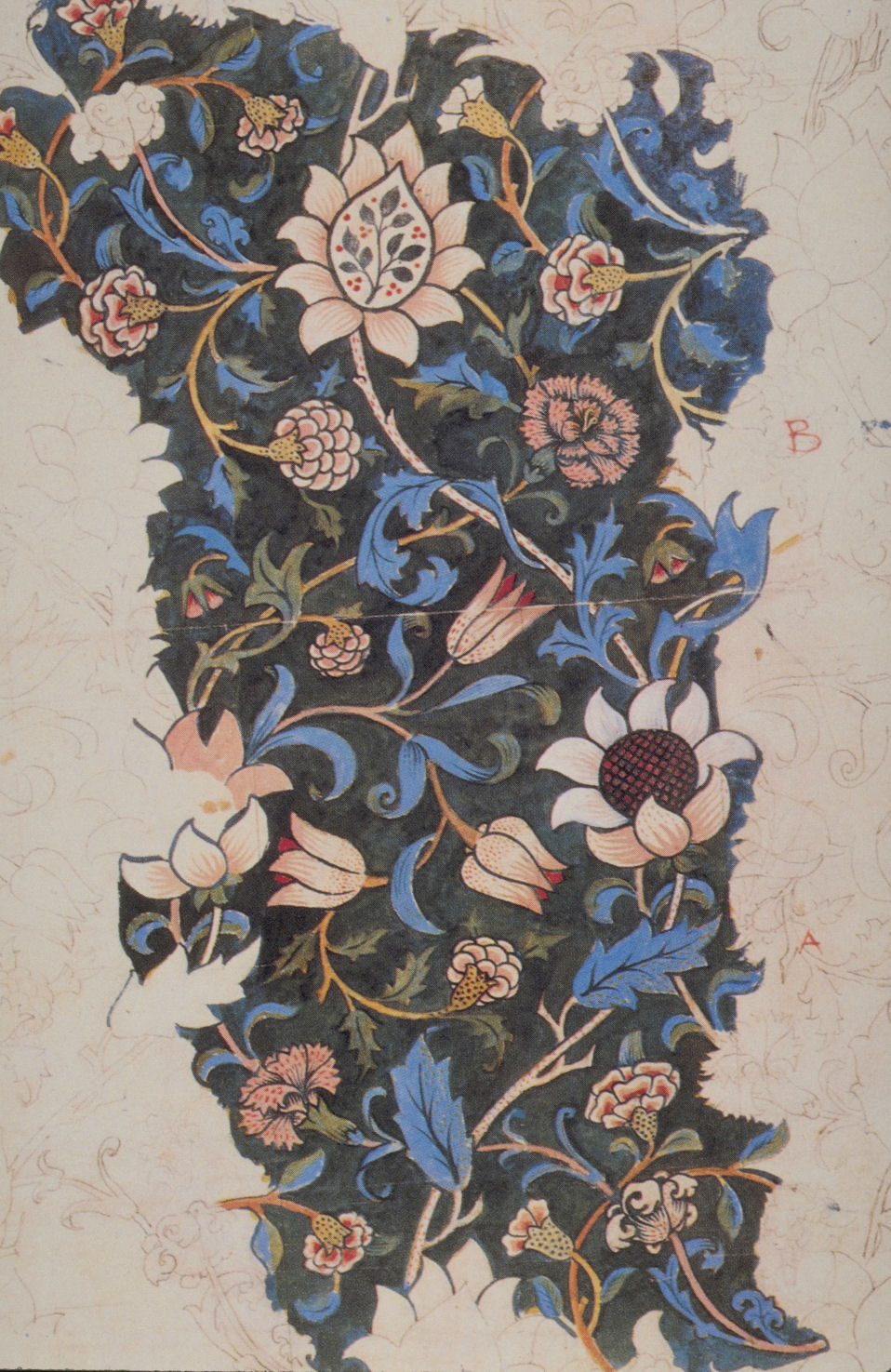
Design for Evenlode textile, Morris, 1883

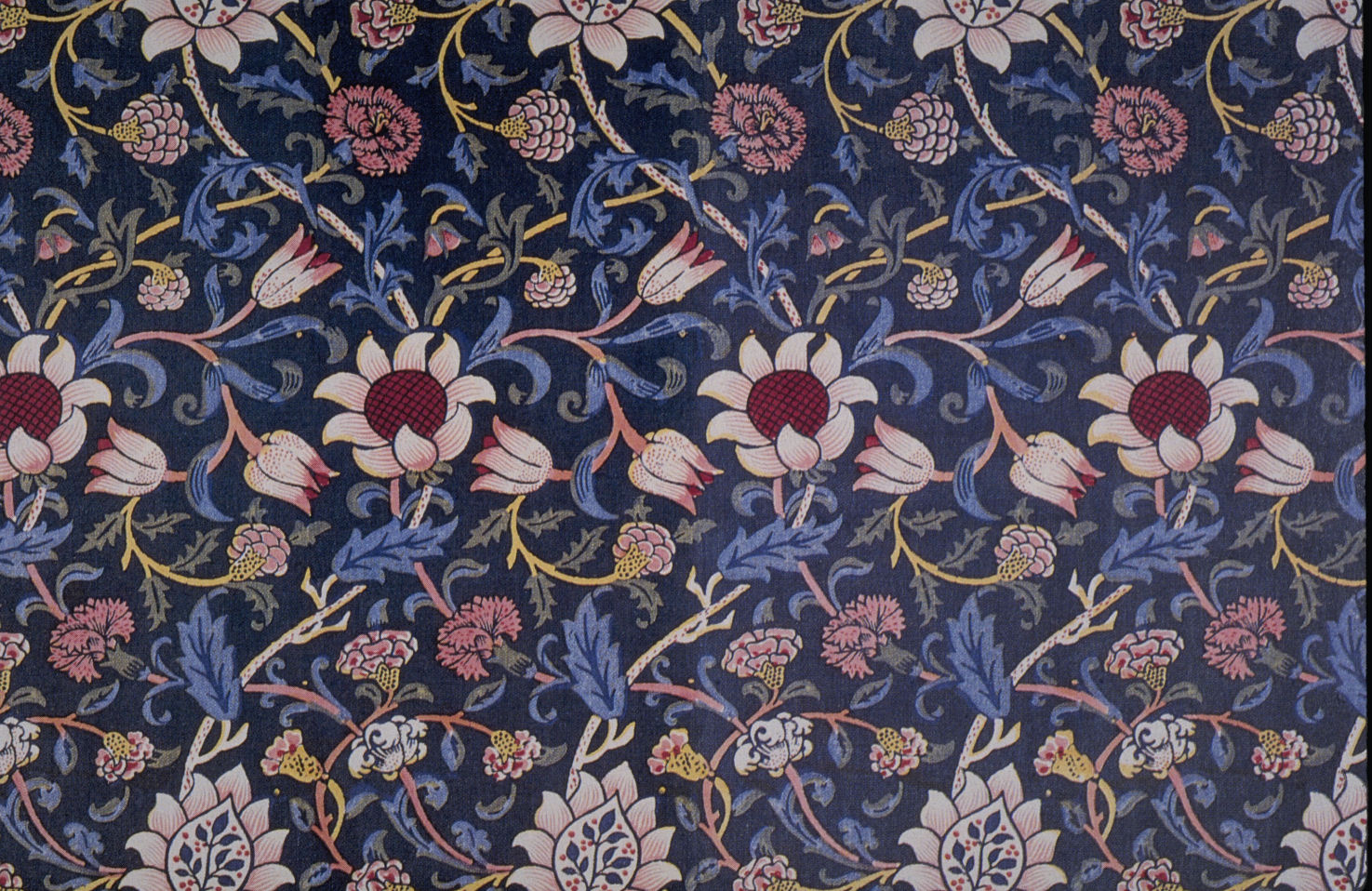
Evenlode indigo discharge and block-printed textile, Morris, 1883

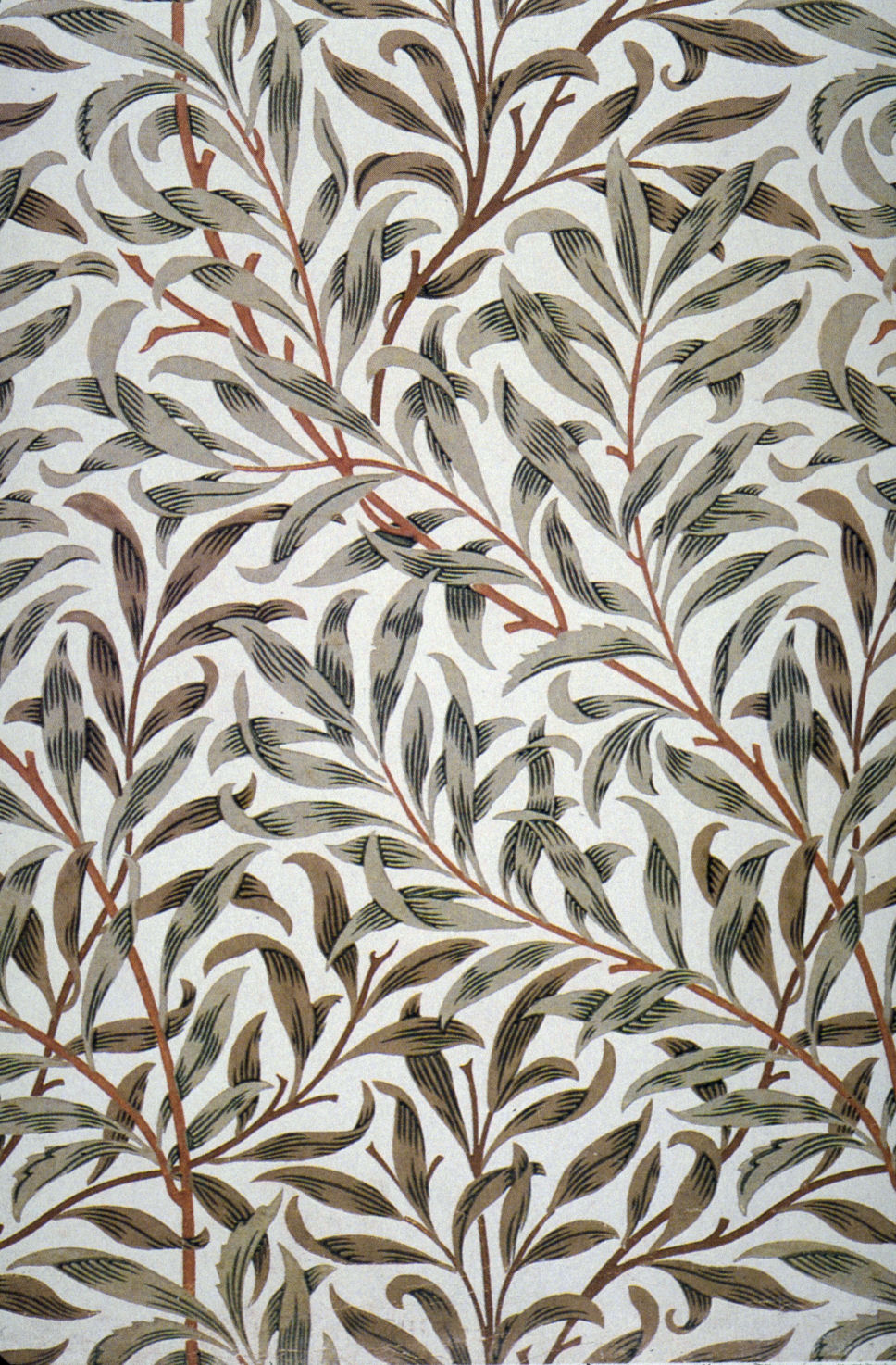
Willow Bough wallpaper, Morris, 1887, repurposed for fabric c. 1895

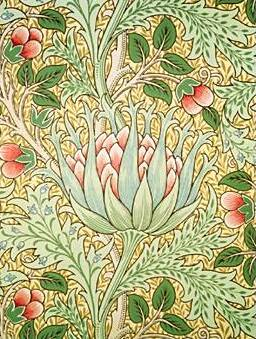
Artichoke wallpaper, designed by John Henry Dearle, 1897

=== Woven textiles ===
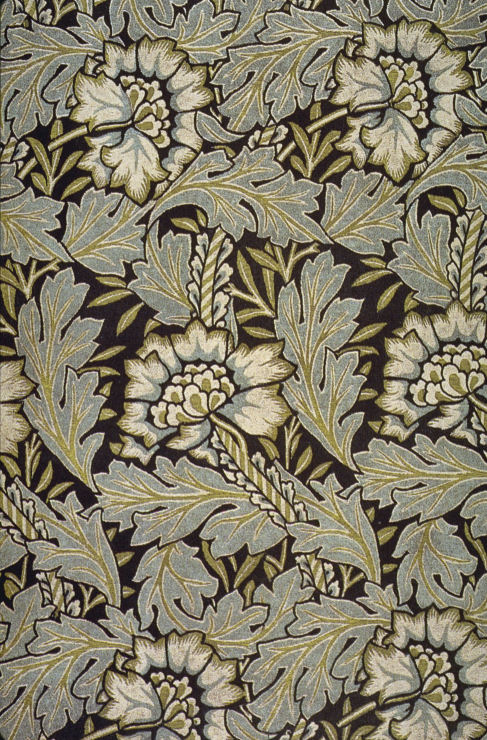
Anemone jacquard-woven silk and wool or silk damask, Morris, 1876

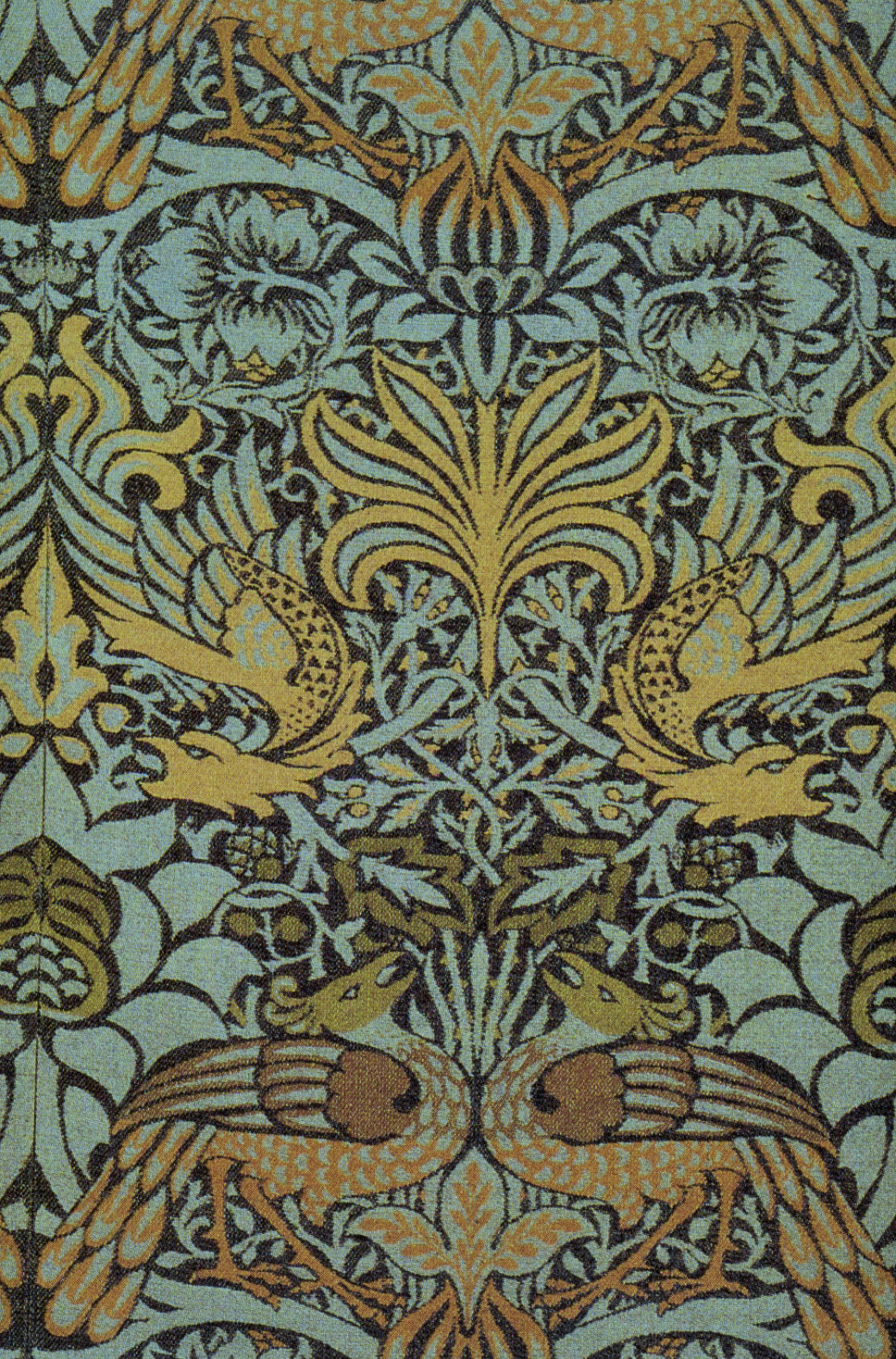
Peacock and Dragon woven woollen fabric, Morris, 1878

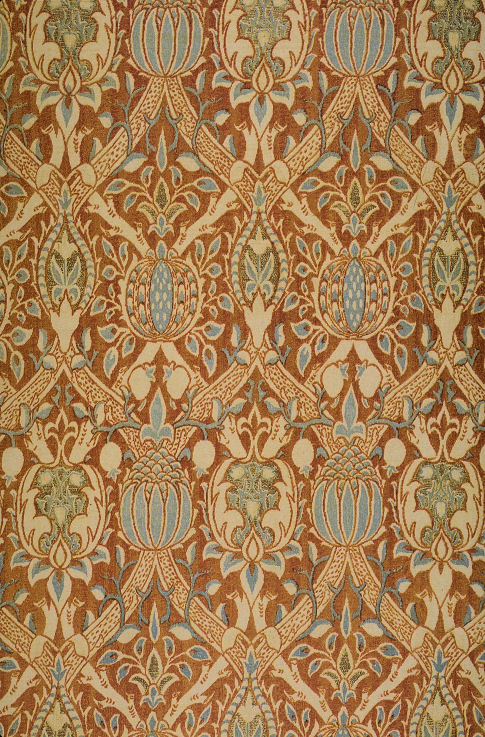
Granada woven silk velvet brocaded with gilt thread and blue areas block-printed, Morris, 1884

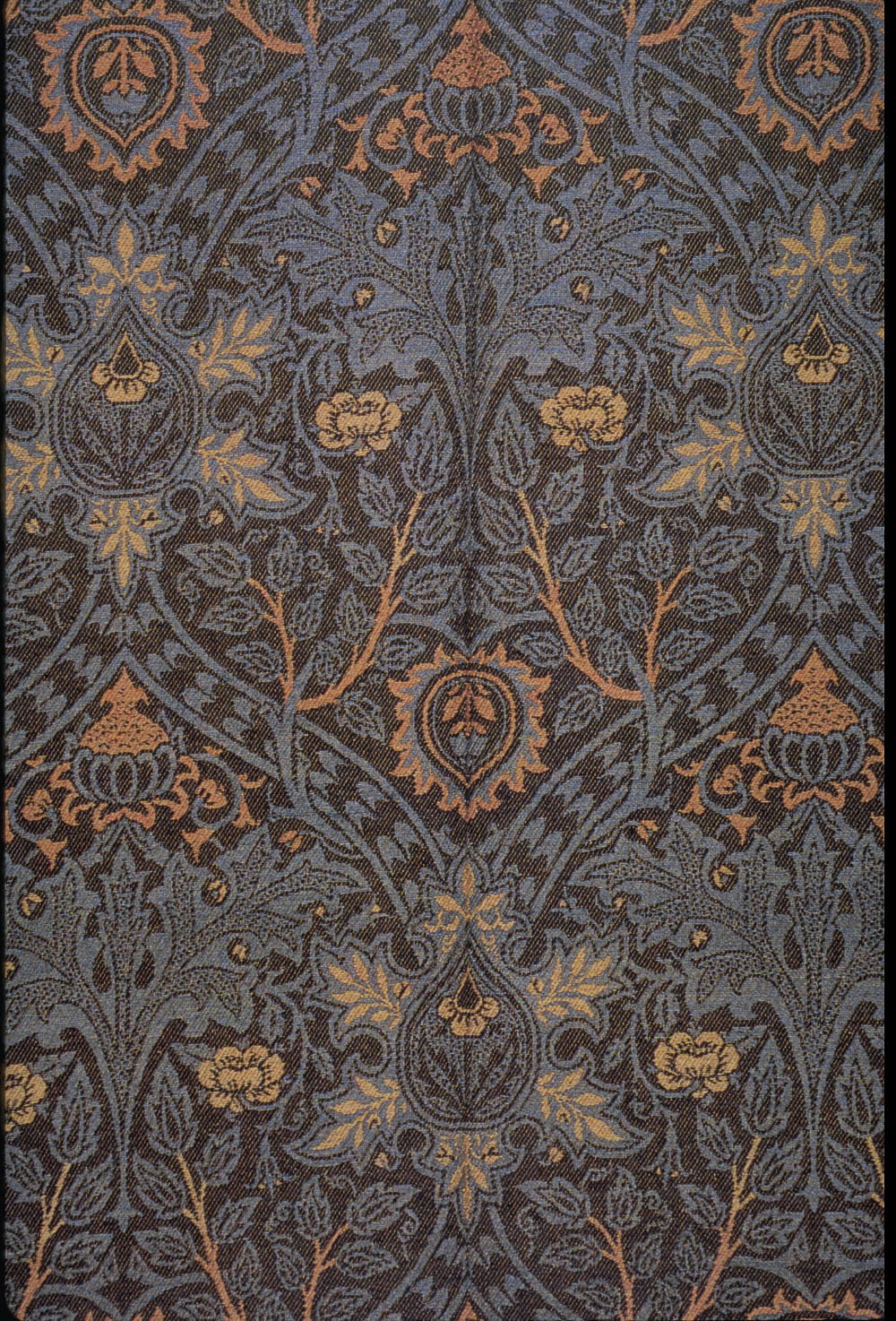
Ispahan woven woollen fabric, Morris, 1888

=== Embroidery ===
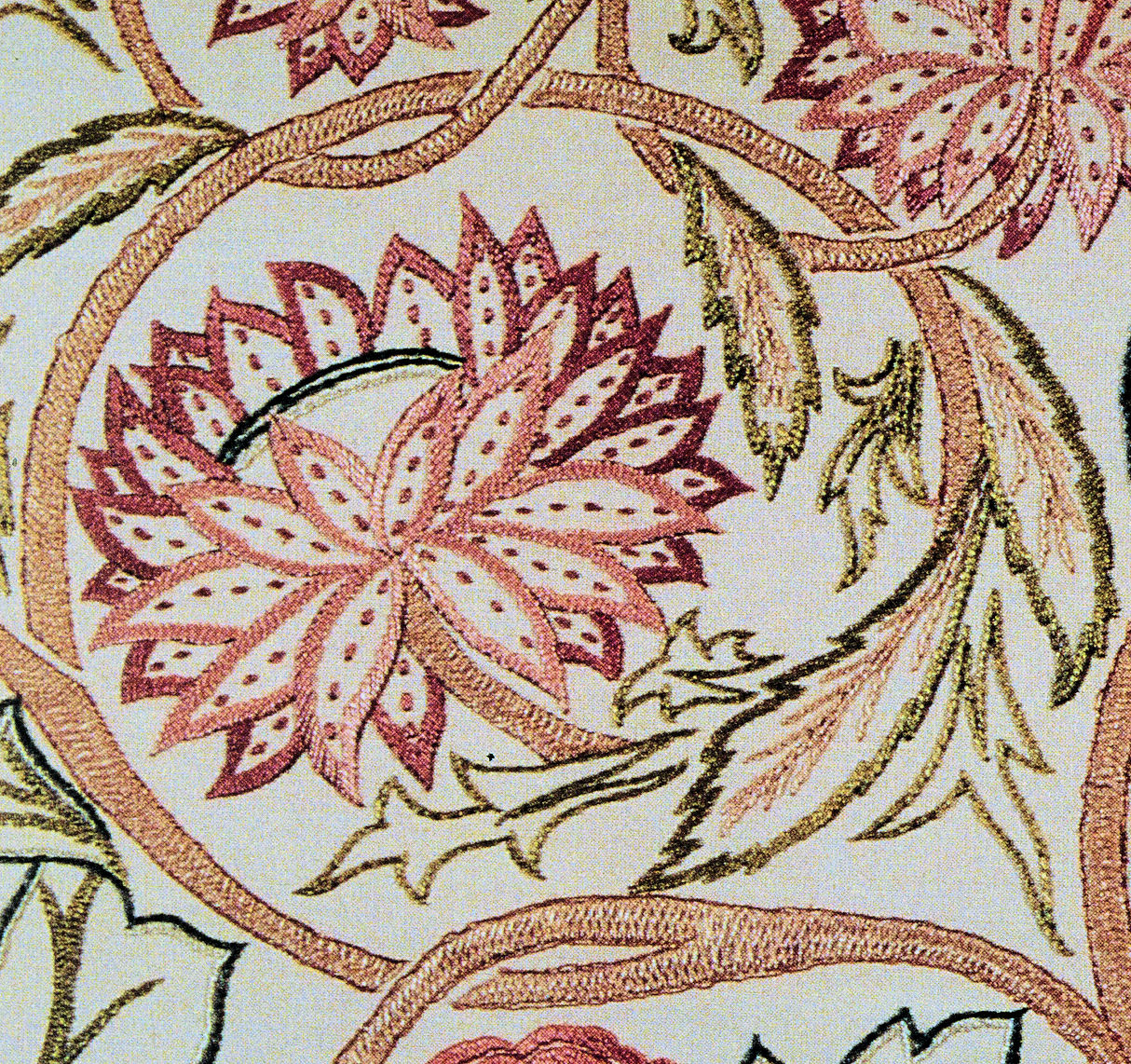
Detail of Flowerpot embroidery, 1890

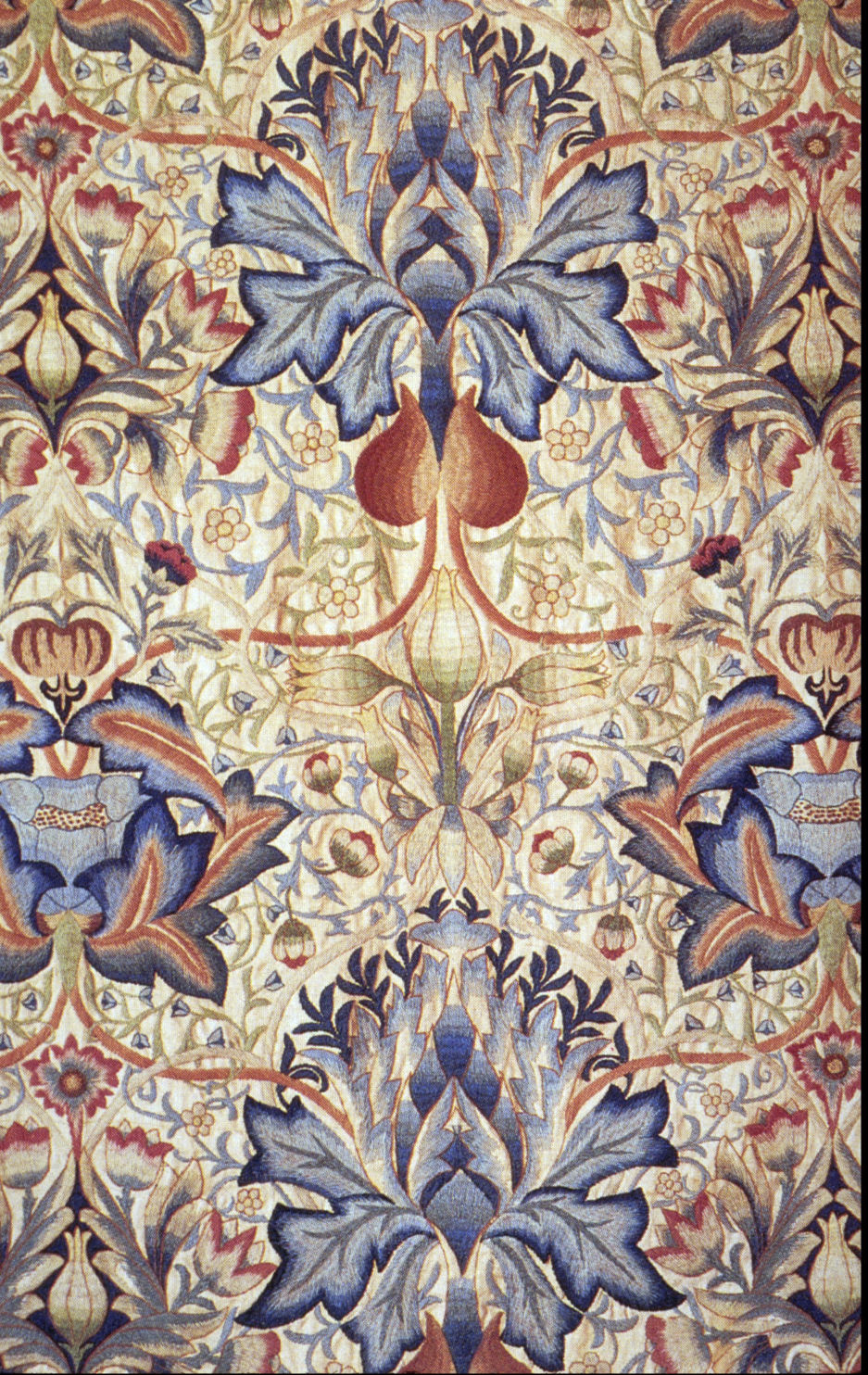
Portion of Artichoke embroidered panel, 1890

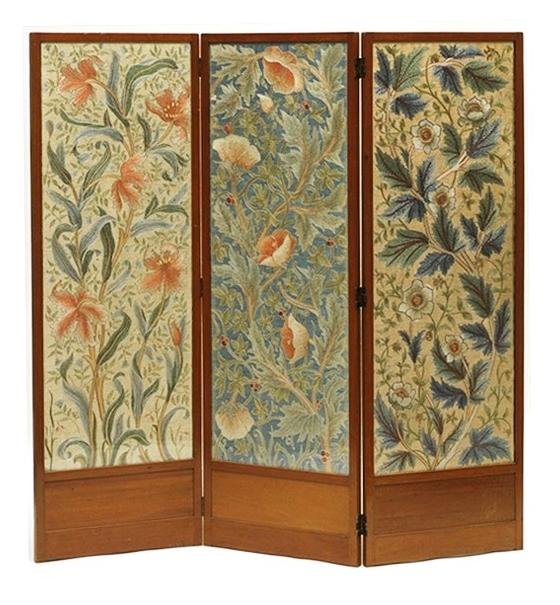
Embroidered screen, designed Dearle, between 1885-1910

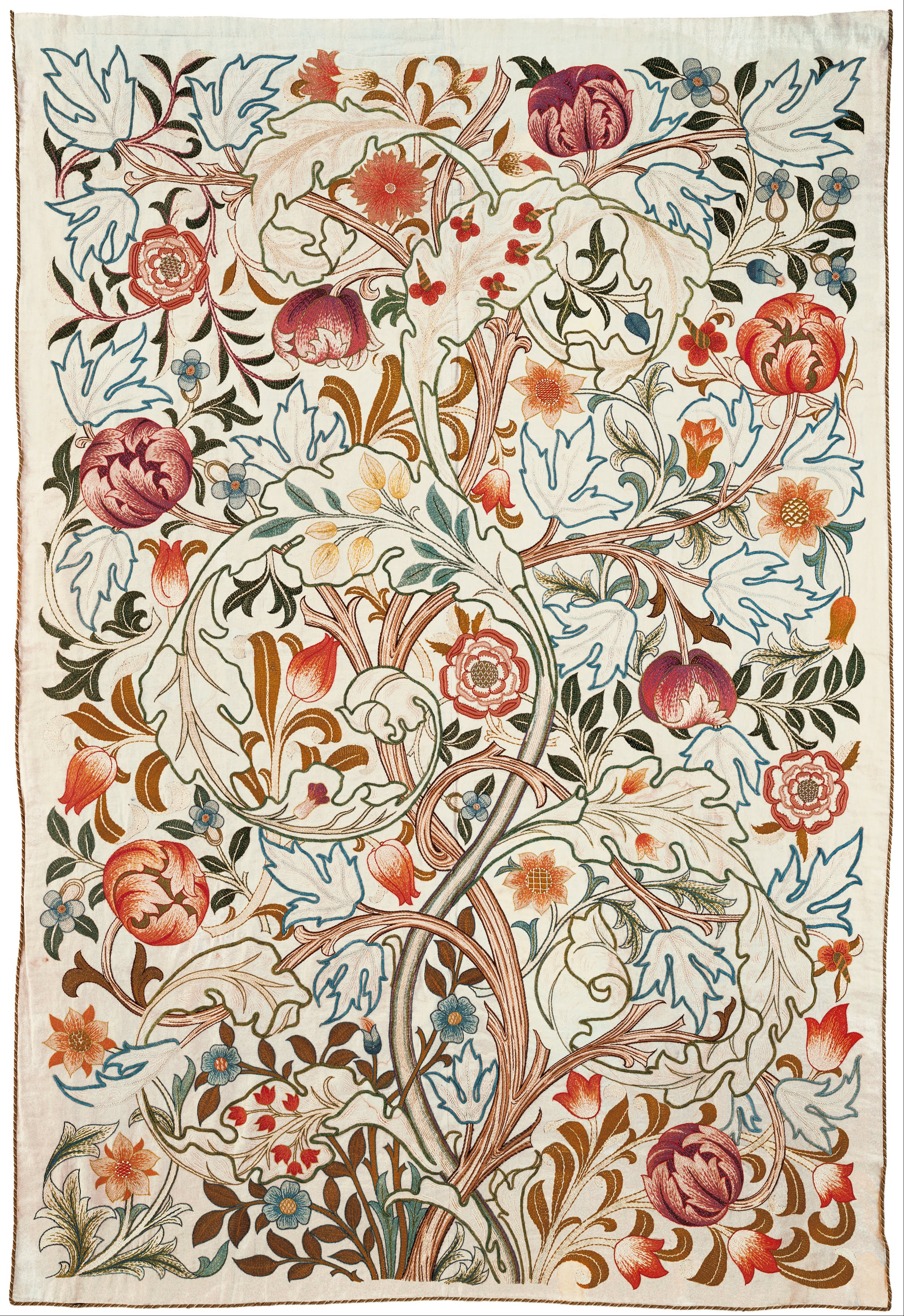
Acanthus portière, silk embroidery on linen, 1890s

=== Tapestry ===
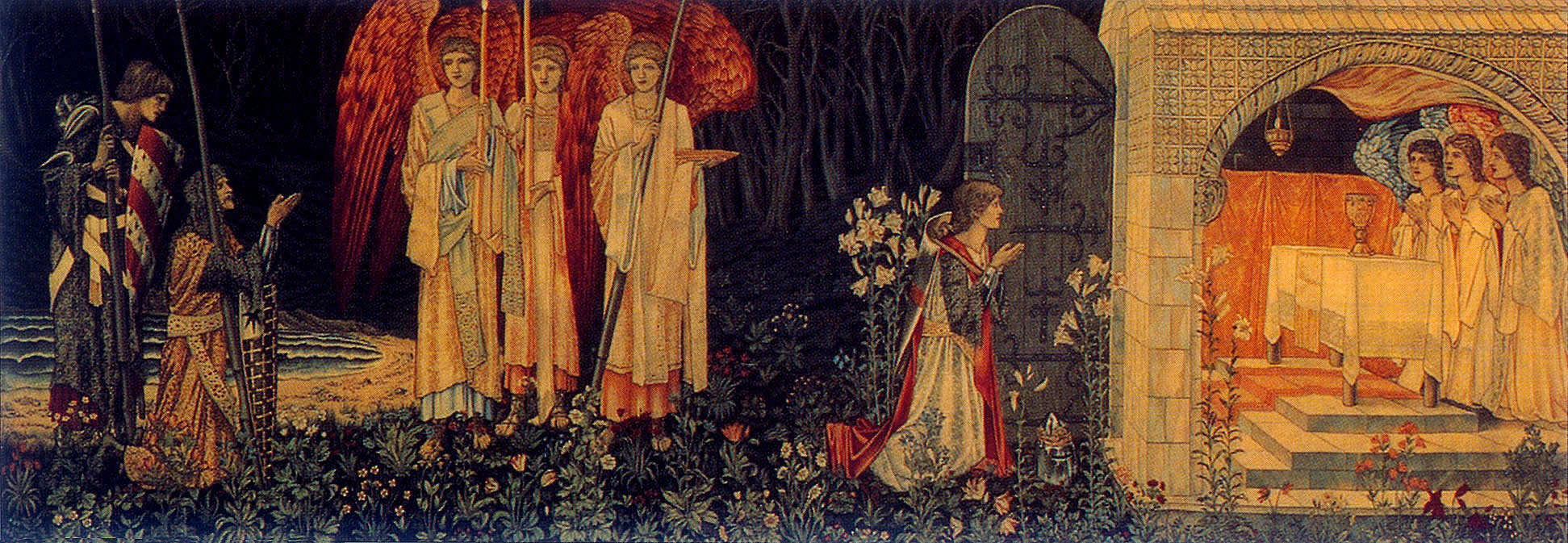
The Vision of the Holy Grail or The Attainment tapestry. Overall design by Morris, figures by Burne-Jones, and backgrounds by Dearle Morris and Company, 1890

== See also ==
- Art needlework
- British and Irish stained glass (1811–1918)
- Decorative Designers
- May Morris
- Pre-Raphaelite Brotherhood
- Stained glass
- Victorian Era
- William Morris wallpaper designs
