= Kathleen Allington =

British textile designer with Morris & Co.

- Born: Kathleen Kersey; 1888
- Died: February 2, 1986
- Education: William Morris
- Known for: Wallpaper designer at Morris & Co.
- Spouse: Rev Charles Winford Allington

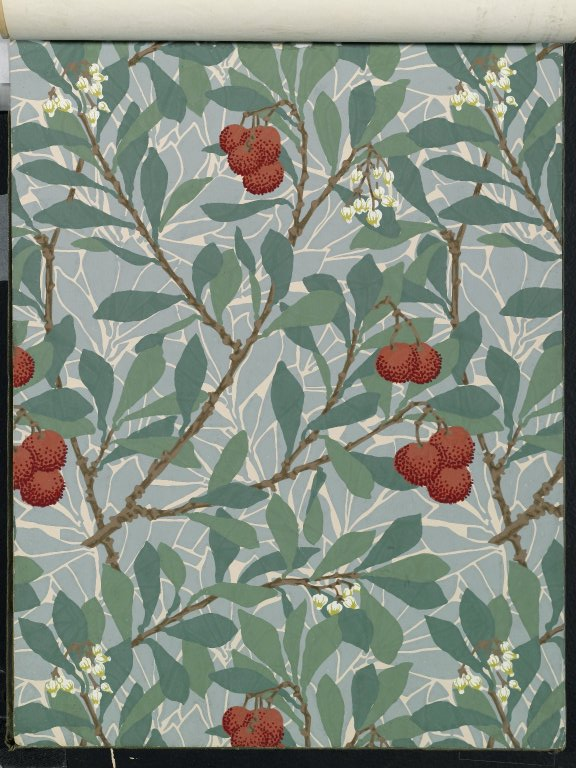
”Arbutus”, detail Wallpaper Sample Book 1, page 63: Arbutus, pattern #493

Kathleen Allington (née Kersey, 1888–2 Feb 1986) was a British textile designer who produced wallpaper designs released by Morris & Co..

Kersey was born in 1888, a daughter of Alice Steel and London architect Alexander Henry Kersey of Kersey, Gale & Spooner.

== Designs ==
As a student, she entered several drawings in the National Competition of Schools of Art in 1911. The Victoria and Albert Museum holds several of these drawings, including a pattern featuring green parakeets with flowers and fruit, monkeys and squirrels, and pink and green parrots. In 2025, the latter, now titled "Parrots", was adapted and printed on a range of items, including aprons and oven gloves, for sale in the Victoria and Albert Museum Shop.

Three wallpaper designs published by Morris & Co. are attributed to Allington, as Kersey: "Arbutus" (1913), "Verdure" (1913), and "Bird and Pomegranate" (c. 1926). Allington is also known to have created additional designs in the form of sketches.
