= Merton Abbey Works =

Textile factory in Merton, England

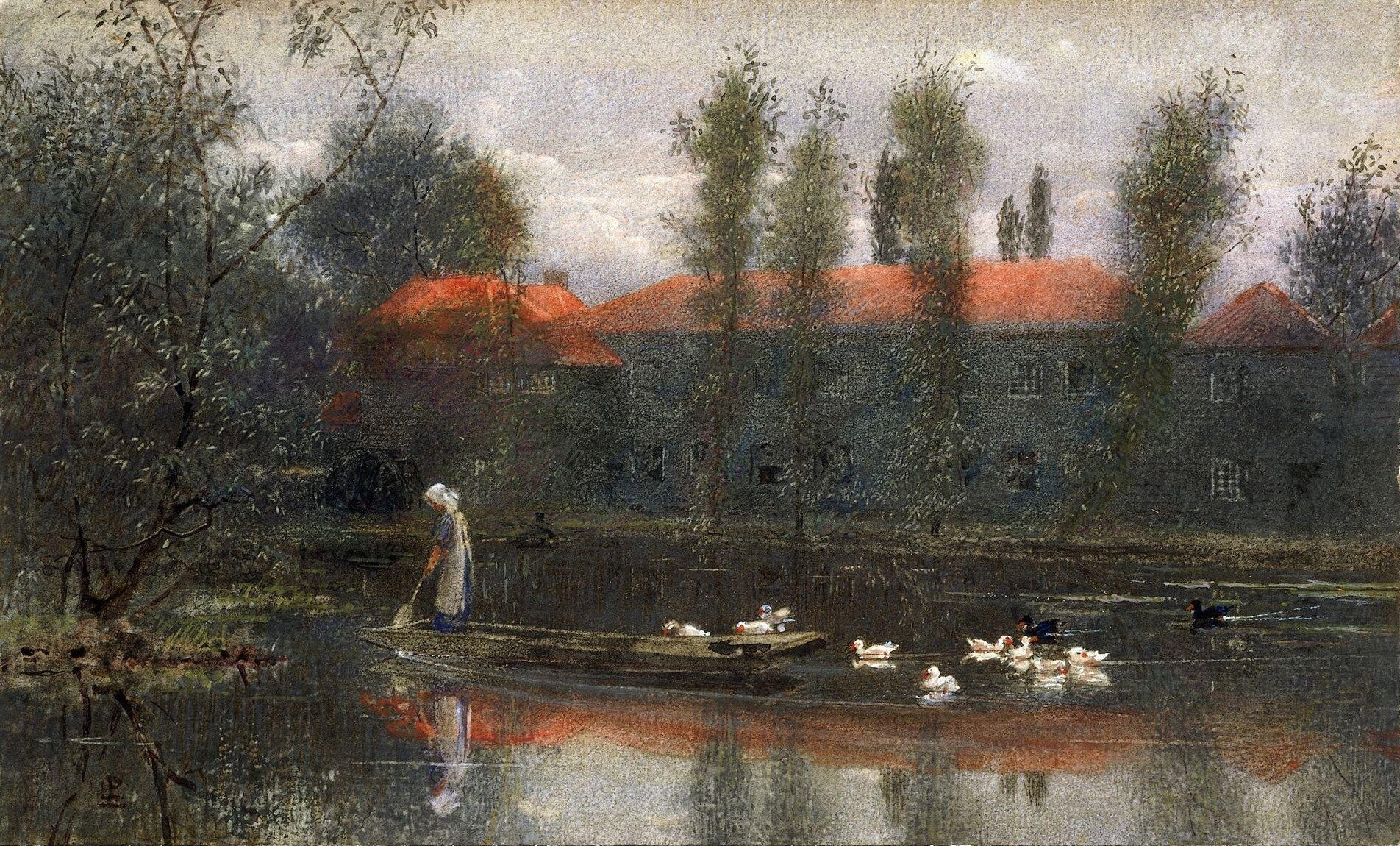
- The Pond at William Morris's Works at Merton, L.L. Pocock, c. 1880s
- Operated: c. 1690s–1940
- Location: Merton
- Coordinates: 51.41539168°N 0.183062017°W
- Industry: Textile industry, Calico printing, Textile printing, Weaving, Stained glass
- Employees: John Henry Dearle
- Owners: Morris & Co., William Morris

The Merton Abbey Works was a textile printing factory in Merton, then part of Surrey but now in Greater London, England. Textile industries were active there from approximately 1690 until 1940. From 1880 to 1940, the Works were the factory of the Arts and Crafts movement design firm Morris & Co. The Works were demolished after the closure of Morris & Co in 1940.

== The site ==
Little is known about the premises of the Works before the nineteenth century, when maps, art, photography, and published descriptions of the site all documented its layout. However, an archaeological dig by Museum of London Archaeology in 1992 confirmed that several of the buildings used by the Works dated from the 1700s and two of the buildings in the site's street frontage originated in the 1500s.

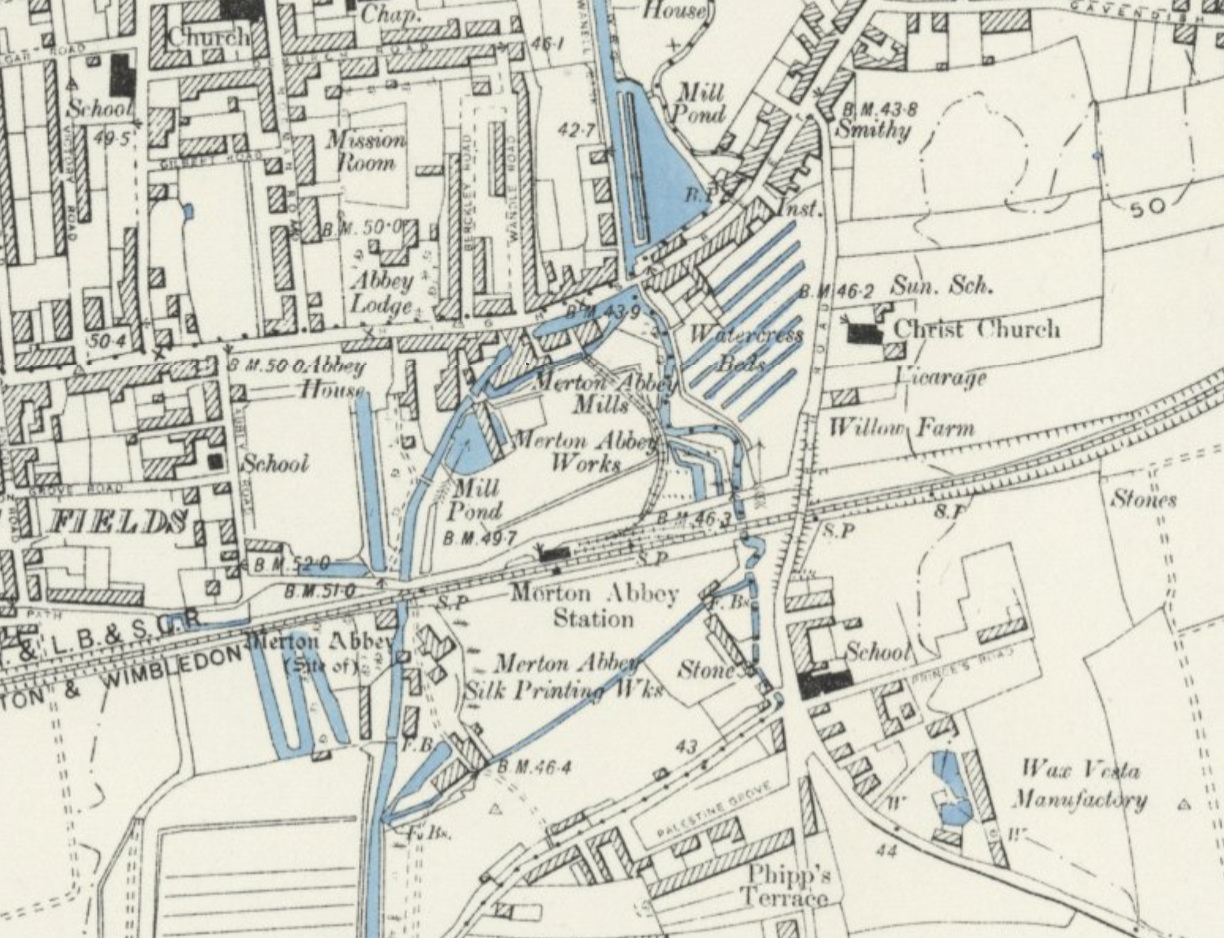
Ordnance Survey map of the Merton Abbey Works area in 1895, showing the site of the Works at centre.

When Morris & Co. began their lease in 1881, the Works consisted of a seven-acre site spanning the River Wandle, which runs northeast through the area. The smaller northwestern portion of the premises ran south from Merton High Street to the river and included a street frontage of old homes with a yard and factory buildings beyond. A wooden bridge crossed the Wandle. Beyond the river, the site expanded both south and east, and included a millpond and fields as well as a further factory building. A copper mill, later converted to a paper and cardboard mill, lay to the north and east of the site. To the south was Merton Abbey railway station and, beyond the railway tracks, Merton Abbey Mills.

== History ==
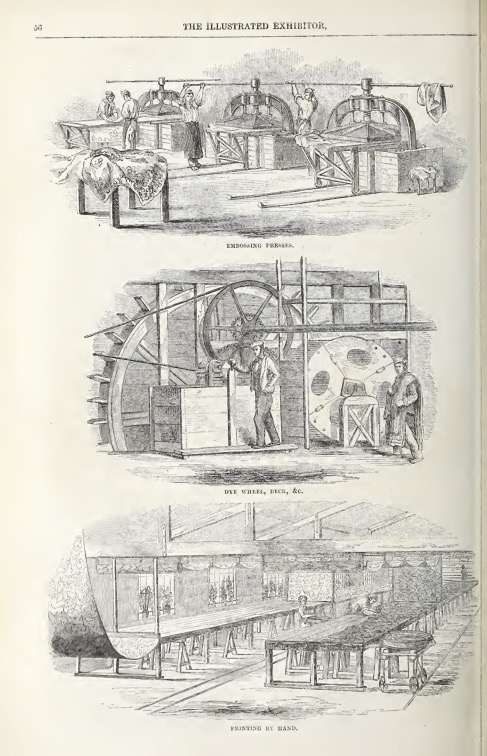
Three views of Thomas Welch's tablecloth printing works, printed in The Illustrated exhibitor and magazine of art, 1852.

The Works were part of a long history of textile industry along the River Wandle in what is now southwest London. These industries took advantage of the river’s clean water to bleach and dye fabrics. The first textile industry along the river, in the mid-1600s, was bleaching. By the 1690s, calico printers were also working there.

The Works occupied part of the former site of Merton Priory. After the Priory was destroyed during dissolution of the monasteries in the late 1530s, several industrial premises were set up on its former lands. By the 1660s, these industries included a bleaching ground. In 1724, a calico printworks had opened at Merton Abbey Mills and in 1752 another followed just downriver (north) at the Merton Abbey Works.

The Works was used by many fabric-printing firms throughout the second half of the 1700s and the first half of the 1800s. Between 1752 and around 1819, the works were used for calico-printing. They were then variously used to print silks, calicos, and woolens between 1819 and 1844. In 1846, Thomas Welch took possession of the Works and began to use it to print tablecloths. Welch's work became well known: one of his tablecloths won a prize medal at the Great Exhibition in 1851. Afterwards, the factory was written about in The Illustrated exhibitor and magazine of art. By the late 1870s, however, Welch's firm was on the wane, and by 1880 they were ready to give up their lease.

== Morris & Co. ==
By the end of the 1870s, Morris & Co. had outgrown their premises at 26 Queen Square, a row house in Bloomsbury, central London. The company's showroom moved to Oxford Street in 1877, and by the end of 1880, the need for a dedicated manufacturing space was also clear. William Morris set out to find a factory space with his friend, ceramicist William De Morgan, who was also looking for a space for his pottery operation. After visiting several sites on the outskirts of London and as far away as Blockley in the Cotswolds, Morris settled on the Merton Abbey Works. The site had much to offer: convenience to central London, the good dyeing water of the Wandle, and the pre-existing buildings and dye facilities of the Welch factory. Morris signed a lease, and in June 1881, Morris & Co. moved in. De Morgan did not join them, but set up his pottery nearby in Merton.

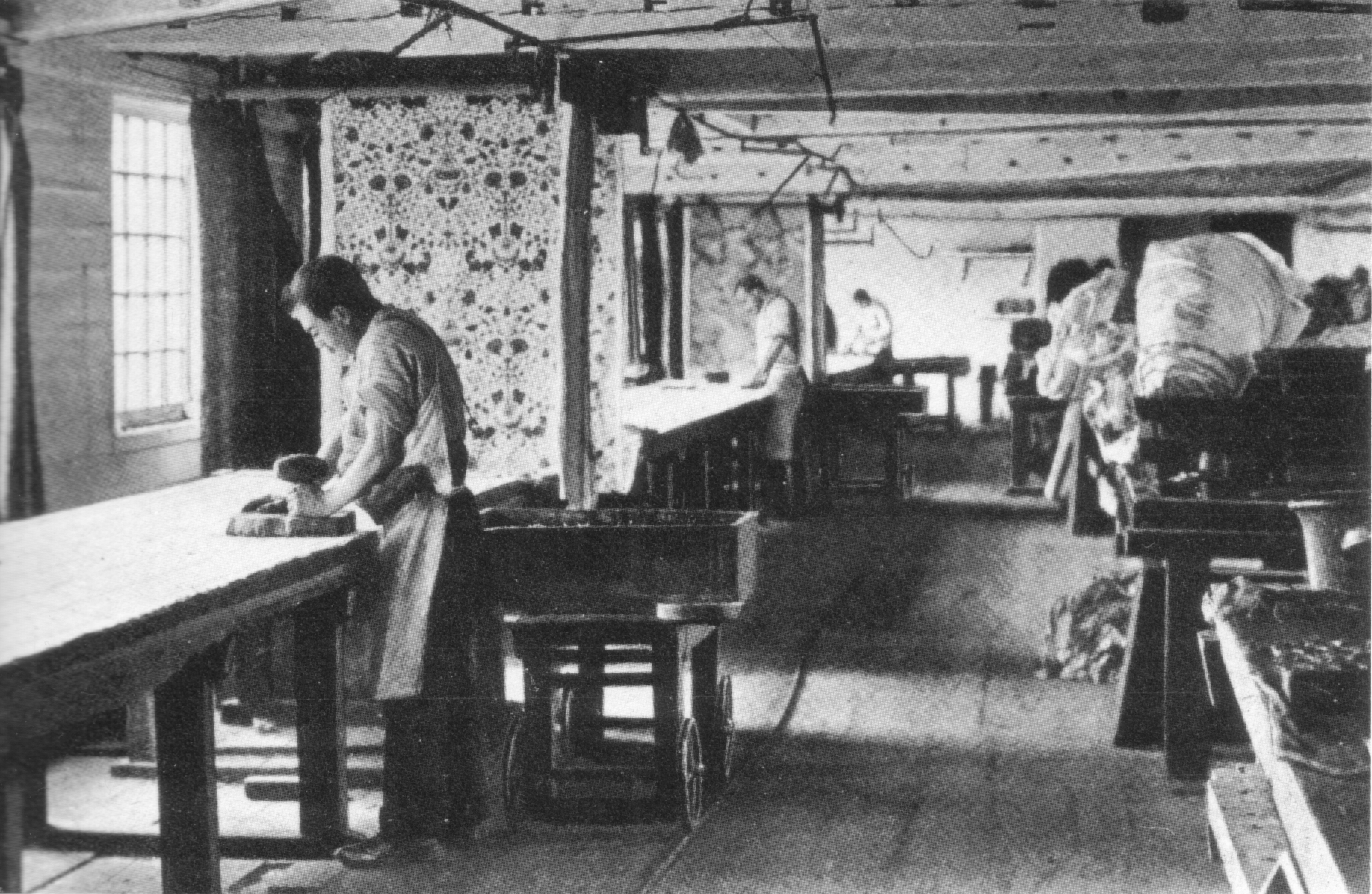
The Morris & Co. fabric printing room at Merton Abbey, c. 1890.

Morris & Co. converted the existing factory buildings to their needs. The primary buildings were two long, two-story "sheds", one on either side of the river. The shed on the north side ran alongside a factory yard. It housed the dye workshop on the ground floor and the stained glass workshop above. The shed on the south side was near the millpond. The hand-weaving workshop for tapestries and carpets was on the ground floor and the fabric printing room was above.

Another smaller shed on the north side of the river held a workshop for semi-automated Jacquard-weave looms. Later, in 1909, another workshop was added in the factory yard to accommodate the company's expansion into the repair of historic tapestries. A shed overhanging the river held a wheel that was used for washing fabric.

In 1886, the American poet Emma Lazarus visited Morris at the Works. In her article about the visit, she recorded that "One is not surprised to find his factory a scene of cheerful, uncramped industry, where toil looks like pleasure, where flowers are blooming in the windows, and sunshine and fresh air brighten the faces of artist and mechanic."

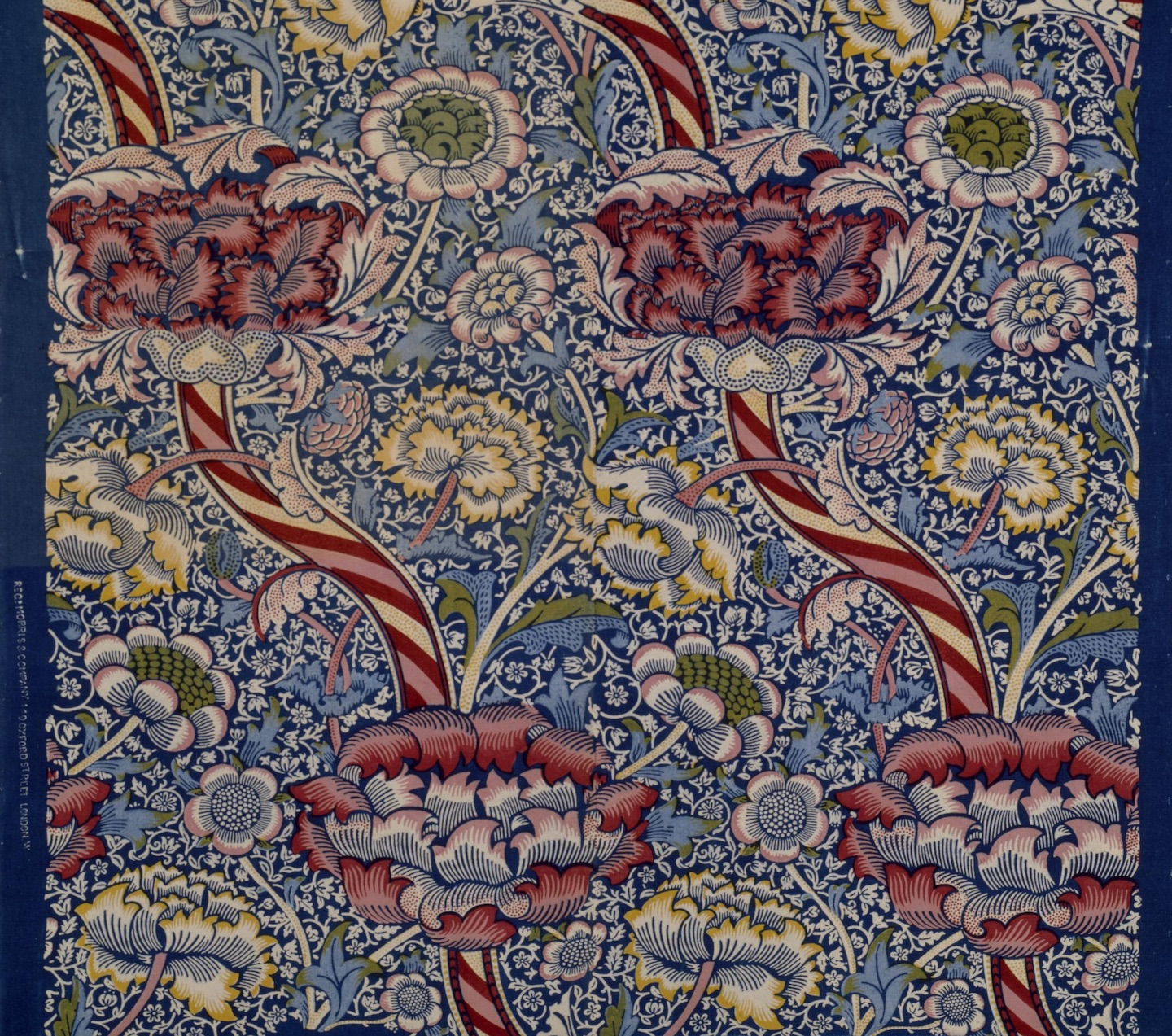
William Morris, Wandle, 1884. Printed cotton. Victoria & Albert Museum T.45-1912.

The move to Merton Abbey enabled Morris & Co. to expand their manufacturing operations and to pursue new techniques. Morris had long wanted to find a vivid, consistent, and lightfast blue dye, but had been disappointed by experiments with his former collaborator and manufacturer, Thomas Wardle. At the Merton Abbey Works, Morris and his master-dyers were able to use the indigo discharge technique to achieve the blue he wanted. Inspired, Morris designed many printed fabrics using the technique. One, Wandle (1884), was named "to honour our helpful stream."

Morris & Co. operated at the Merton Abbey Works for almost 60 years, creating a wide range of products. However, some of their most well-known goods were manufactured elsewhere, such as wallpapers, which were manufactured by Jeffrey & Co in Islington, London.

Morris & Co. Products Manufactured at the Merton Abbey Works

- Dyed embroidery and weaving threads
- Hand-woven carpets
- Hand-woven tapestries
- Jacquard-woven fabrics
- Printed fabrics
- Stained glass
- Tapestry repair

== After Morris & Co. ==
Morris & Co. closed in 1940. The Merton Abbey Works site was sold to the neighboring cardboard factory, the New Merton Board Mills. The Board Mills expanded onto the site, demolishing the Merton Abbey Works buildings and building on its open land. The Board Mills operated until 1984. The site was then redeveloped. The eastern portion of the site is now part of the premises of a Sainsbury's shopping centre, and the western portion is office buildings.
