= Peter Paul Marshall =

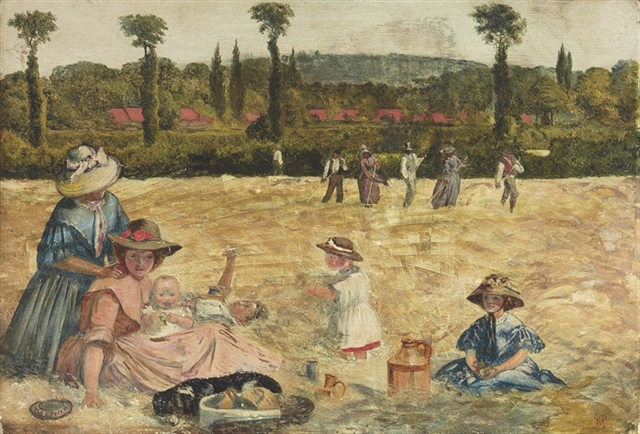
Haymaking by Peter Paul Marshall, 1860.

Peter Paul Marshall (1830 – 16 February 1900) was a Scottish civil engineer and amateur painter, and a founding partner of the decorative arts firm Morris, Marshall, Faulkner & Co.

Marshall was born in Edinburgh, the son of local artist, William Marshall, and was educated at Edinburgh High School. He worked as a draughtsman for Thomas Grainger, a civil engineer and early Scottish railway builder. In 1847, he became an assistant to architect James Newlands, and accompanied him to Liverpool when Newlands was appointed Civil Engineer to the Borough. Marshall exhibited paintings at the Liverpool Academy in 1852 and 1854.

Marshall was living in London by 16 March 1857, when he married Augusta Buchanan Miller, daughter of John Miller, an important early patron of the artists of the Pre-Raphaelite Brotherhood. Later that year he became surveyor to the Tottenham Local Board of Health.

Marshall was introduced to Pre-Raphaelite circles in London by Ford Madox Brown, whom he had probably met when Madox Brown was exhibiting in Liverpool in the 1850s. In 1861 Marshall became a founder-shareholder in Morris, Marshall, Faulkner & Co., "Fine Art Workmen in Painting, Carving, Furniture and the Metals," along with William Morris, Ford Madox Brown, Edward Burne-Jones, Charles Faulkner, Dante Gabriel Rossetti, and Philip Webb. Marshall's exact role in the firm is unclear. According to William Michael Rossetti, the idea of forming a decorative arts firm originated with Marshall, and Marshall designed some stained glass panels and furniture for the firm, but most writers have followed Morris's biographer John William Mackail in discounting Marshall's contributions.

Marshall continued his work as a civil engineer during the early years of the partnership. He resigned his position with the Tottenham Board of Health under pressure following a typhoid outbreak in 1873. He exhibited several paintings between 1873 and 1875, when Morris, Marshall, Faulkner, & Co. was dissolved, and continued to paint after he accepted the position of City Engineer in Norwich in 1877, a position he held until June 1893 when his health began to fail. He retired to Teignmouth the following year, where he continued his artistic pursuits. He died on 16 February 1900.
