= Merton Abbey Mills =

Former textile factory in Merton, London

Coordinates: 51.4131°N 0.1834°W

Merton Abbey Mills is a former textile factory in the parish of Merton in London, England near the site of the medieval Merton Priory, now the home of a variety of businesses, mostly retailers.

The River Wandle flowing north towards Wandsworth drove watermills and provided water for a number of industrial processes in Merton. Merton Abbey Mills were established by Huguenot silk throwers in the early eighteenth century; there were already textile works nearby from 1667, including those that became the Merton Abbey Works, site of design firm Morris & Co. from 1881 to 1940.

Liberty & Co. had been involved with the site since the 19th century, as their popular ranges of fabrics for dress and furniture were nearly all made there by Littler and Co. In 1904 Liberty & Co took over the Littler site. They continued to operate the Merton Abbey Mills until 1972, and textile production was continued by other firms until 1982. During World War II part of the site was used to construct gun-turrets for the Bristol Blenheim fighter-bomber.

Today Merton Abbey Mills is a crafts market and the site of a summer theatre and music festival called Abbeyfest. A number of buildings from the Liberty period, and even earlier, survive, and there are displays on the history of the site. A water-mill still turns in the summer, and the "colourhouse", a mid-18th century industrial building, is now a children's theatre. The water-mill and colour house are both Grade II listed buildings.

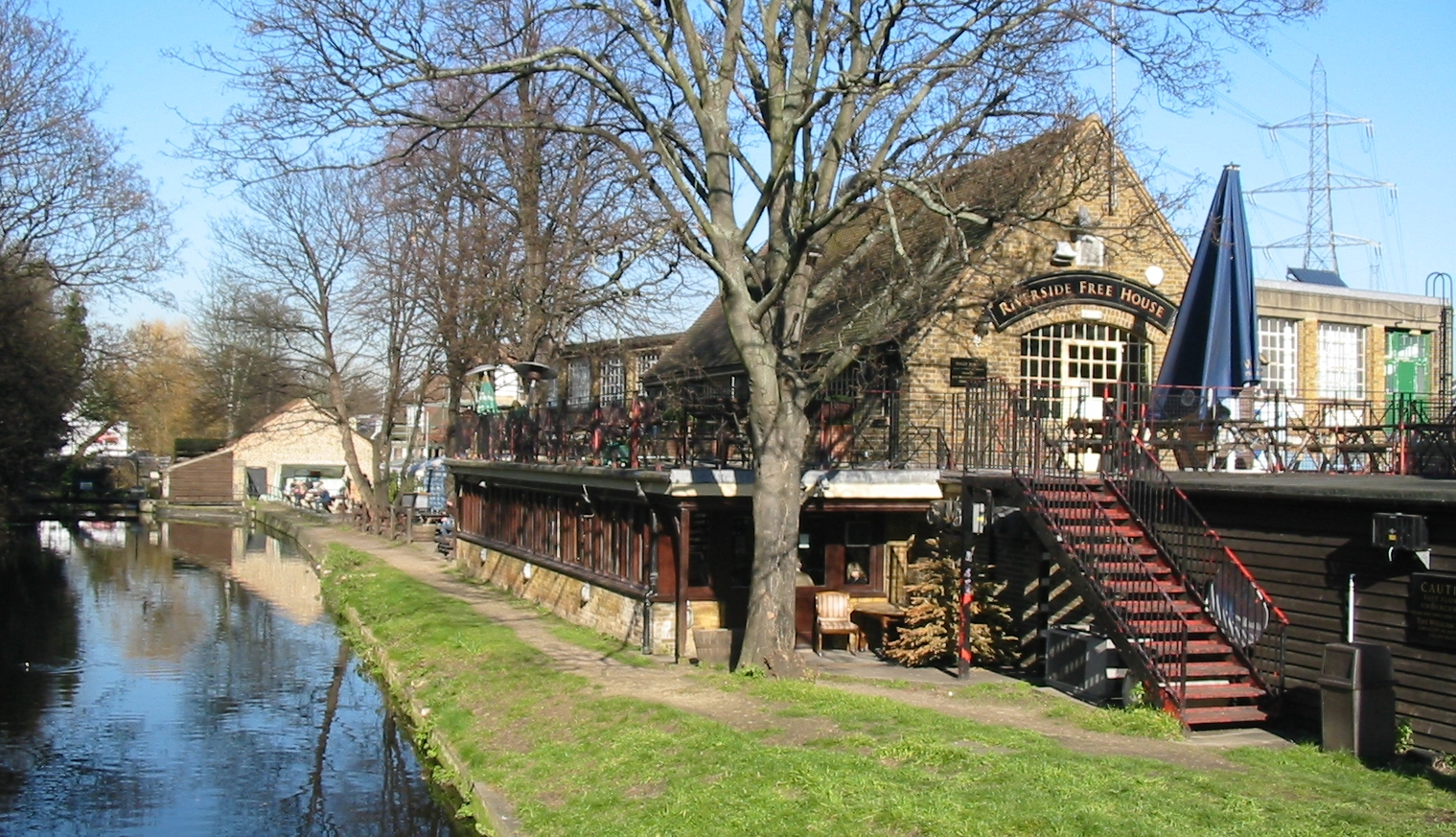
View along the banks of the Wandle, with the watermill at the rear

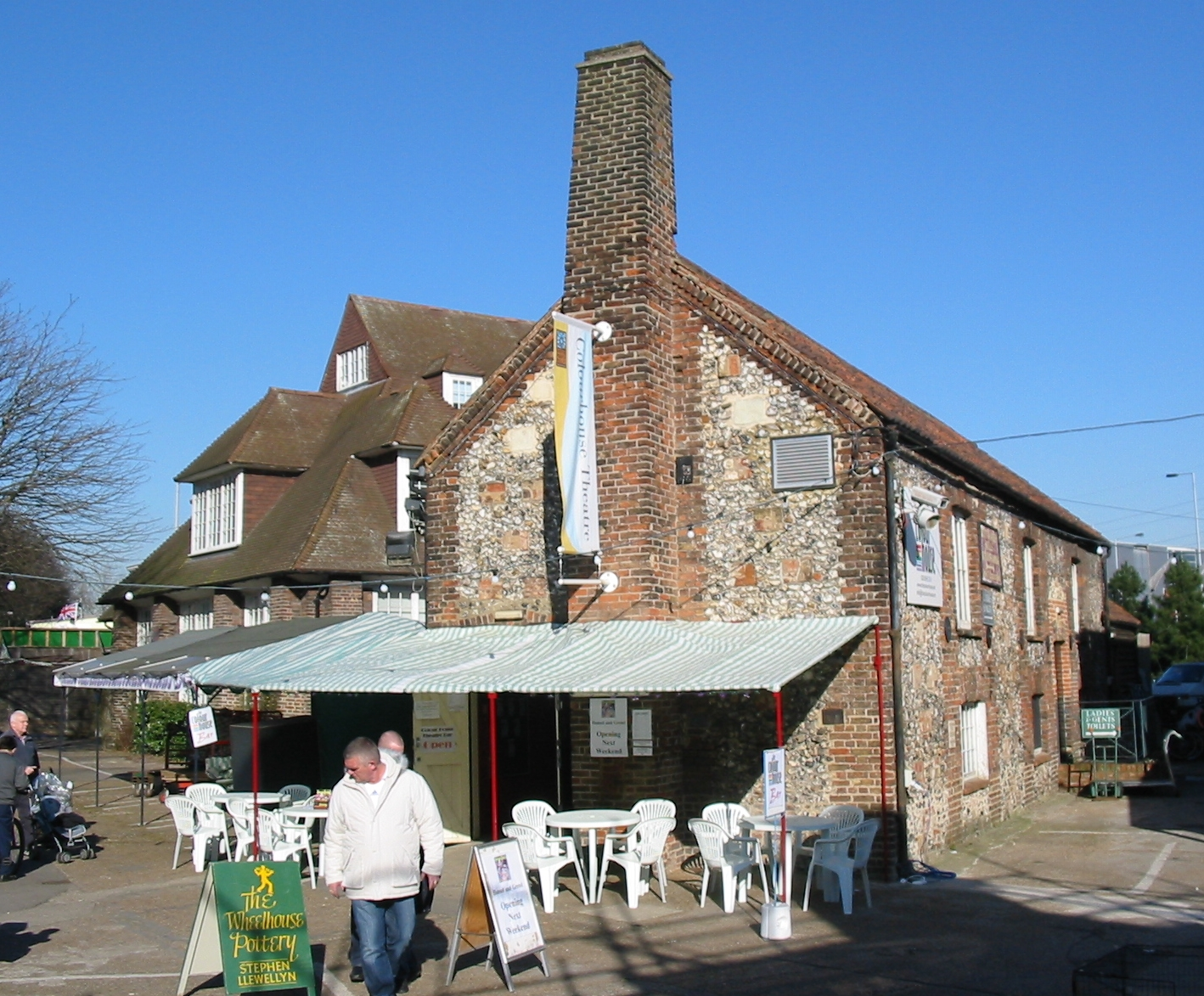
The former "colourhouse"

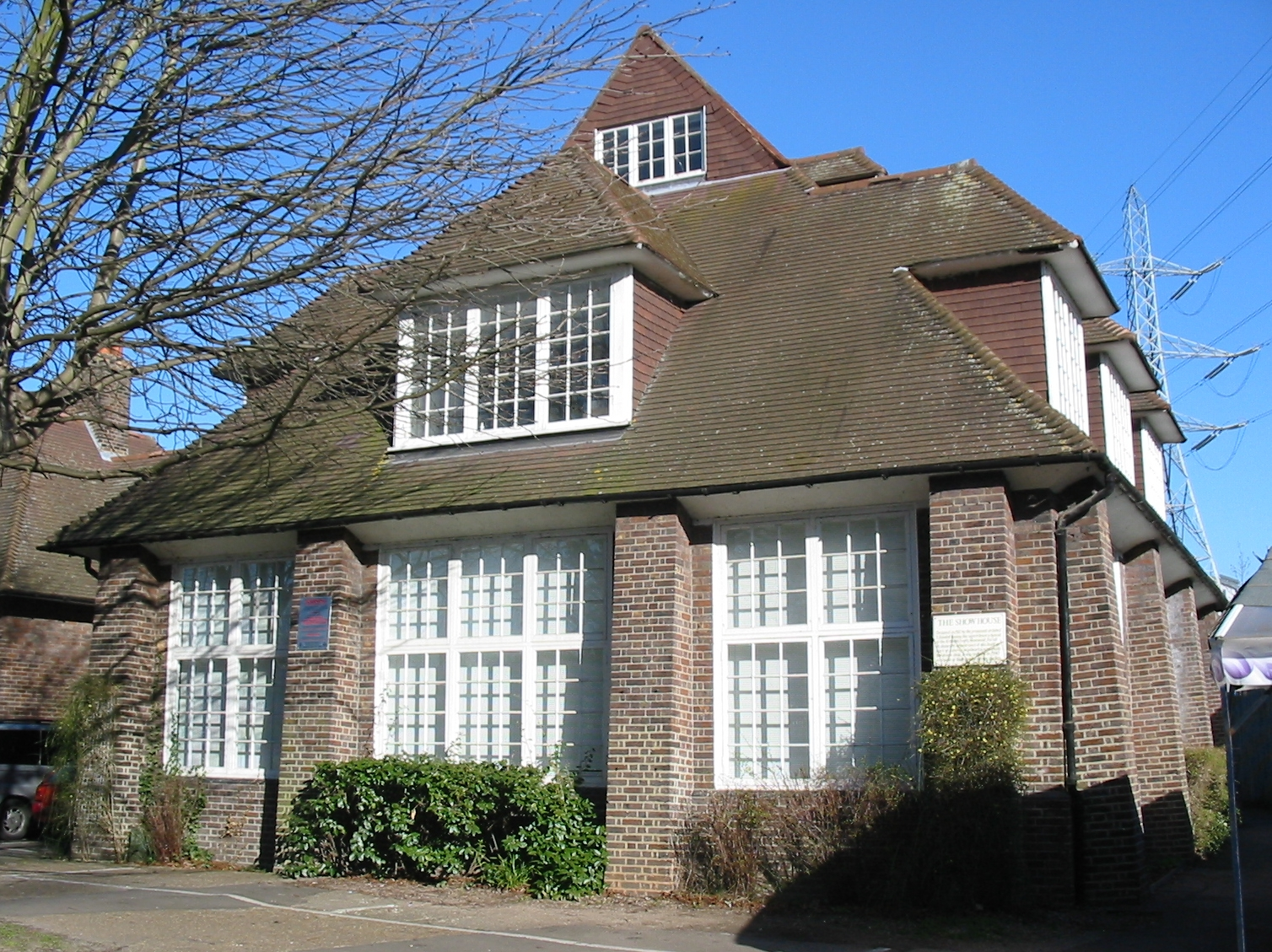
Arts and Crafts building of 1912, used by Liberty & Co. designers.

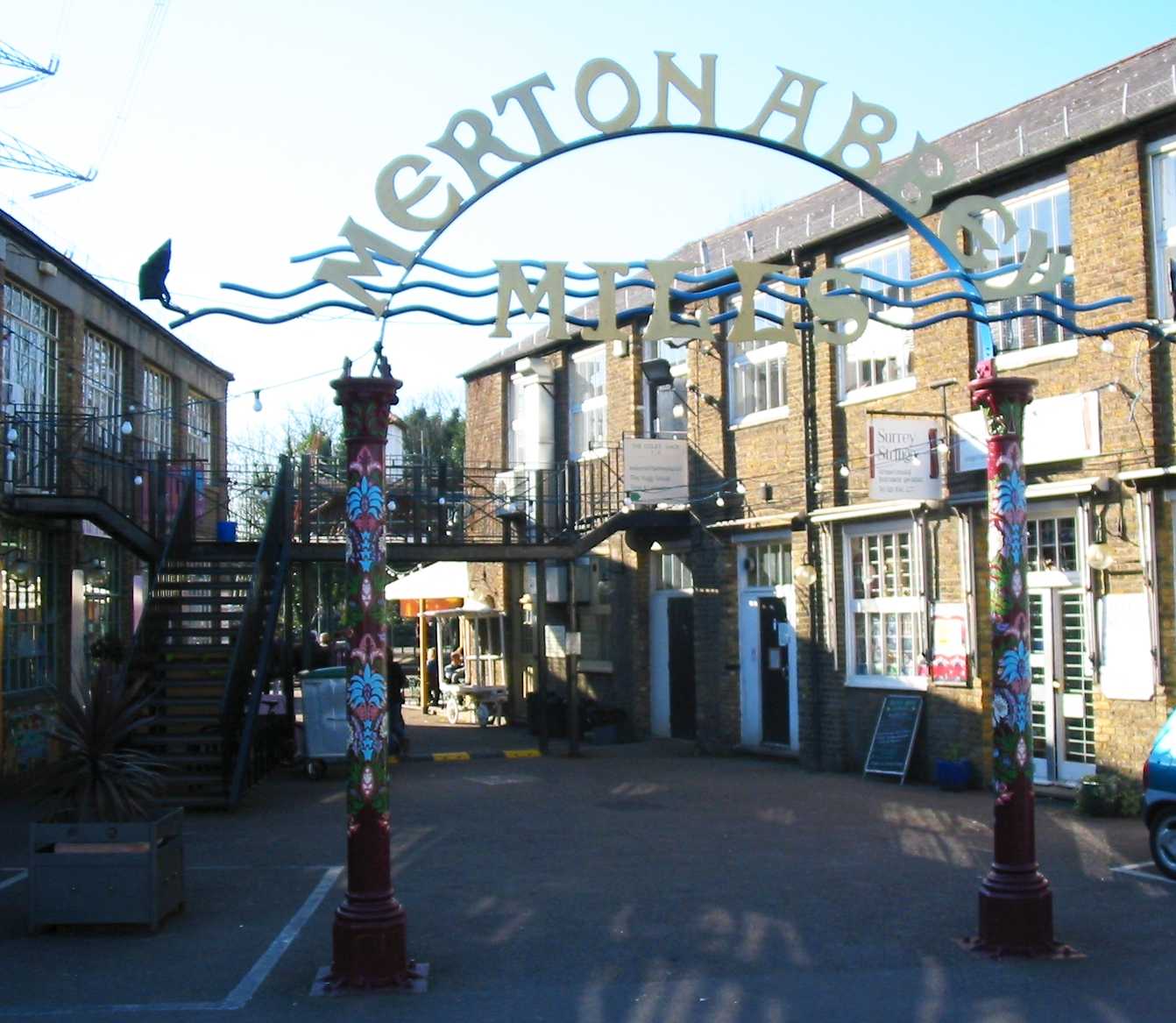
Gateway to Merton Abbey, 2008

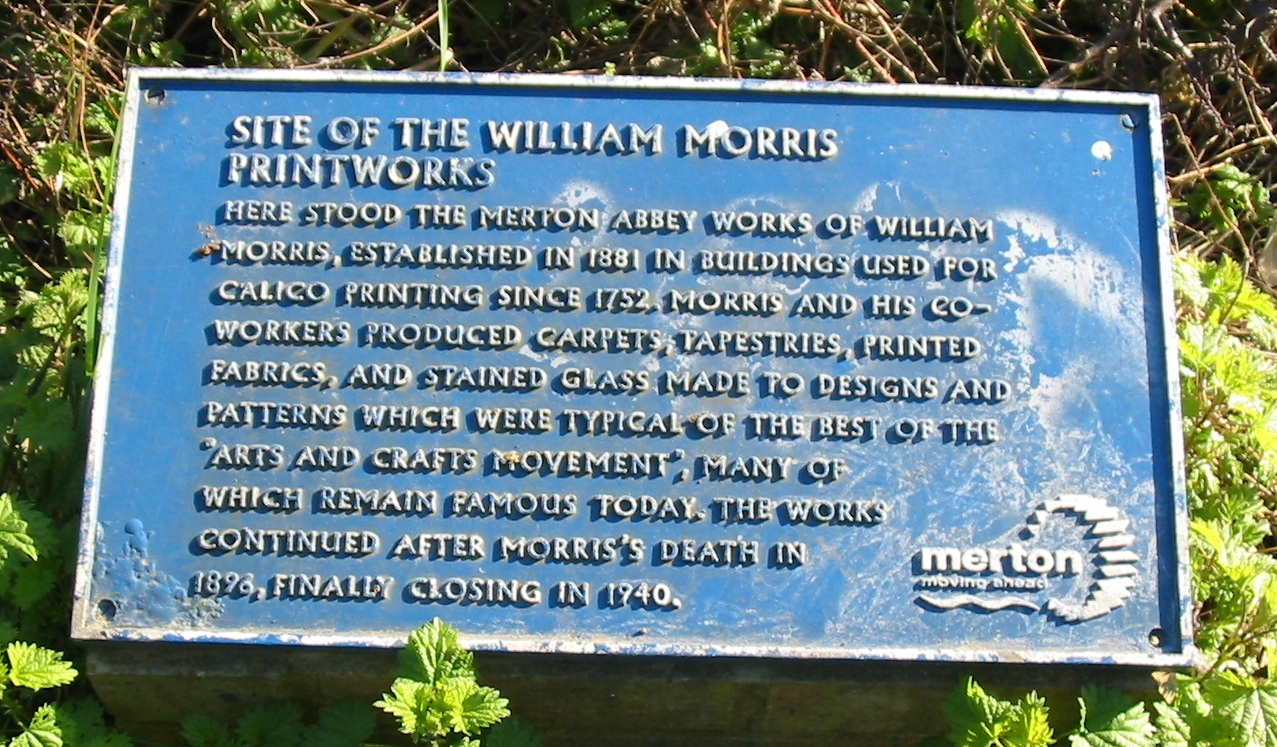
Commemorative plaque

== See also ==
- History of silk
