= Charles Joseph Faulkner =

Charles Joseph Faulkner (1833–1892) was a British mathematician and fellow of University College, Oxford and a founding partner of Morris, Marshall, Faulkner and Co. where he worked with his sisters Kate Faulkner and Lucy Faulkner Orrinsmith.

== Artistic career ==
Faulkner was part of a group of Birmingham men at Pembroke College, Oxford known among themselves as the "Brotherhood" and to historians as the Birmingham Set, along with Richard Watson Dixon and William Fulford. Through them he met William Morris and Edward Burne-Jones, with whom he worked on a number of projects, including the Oxford Union murals and the decoration of Red House. He left Oxford to train as a civil engineer in London in 1860, and in 1861 become a founder-shareholder and shortly thereafter financial manager of the decorative arts firm Morris, Marshall, Faulkner & Co., along with the Pre-Raphaelite artists Morris, Burne-Jones, Ford Madox Brown, and Dante Gabriel Rossetti, as well as engineer P. P. Marshall, and architect Philip Webb. Faulkner participated in the firm's early design commissions including painting the chancel roof of St Michael's Church, Brighton. Faulkner's sisters Kate Faulkner and Lucy Faulkner Orrinsmith were also associated with the firm as artists and designers. Two of Charles Faulkner's cartoons or design drawings for stained glass, part of a series depicting the story of Dives and Lazarus, are in the Victoria and Albert Museum.

== Oxford career ==
Doubting the firm would ever achieve a sound financial footing, Faulkner resigned as financial manager in 1864 and returned to his fellowship at Oxford, although he maintained his ties to his erstwhile partners, accompanying Morris and Eiríkr Magnússon on their 1871 trip to Iceland and remaining a shareholder of the firm until it was reorganized as Morris & Co. in 1875. Morris and Faulkner were also allied in embracing Socialism. Faulkner joined the Eastern Question Association in 1876, and invited Morris to the 1883 meeting in University College hall where Morris announced his conversion to socialism. Both joined the Socialist League in 1885. Faulkner was active in the movement, and persuaded the Radical Association to rename itself the Oxford Socialist League.

One of the first acts of the Oxford branch of the League was invite Morris and Eleanor Marx to a meeting at the Holywell Music Room. This was the occasion of Morris’s first major unscripted speech. About 400 persons were present – 100 or so friends of Morris and Faulkner, 250 neutrals, and 30 avowed anti-socialists. The latter kicked up a storm, howling down Morris’s words and then letting off a stink bomb. Scuffles broke out and Faulkner suspended the meeting.

At Oxford, Faulkner served as bursar (1864–1882), dean of degrees (1875–1889), registrar (1866–1882) and librarian (1884–1889). He resigned his Oxford fellowship after suffering a stroke in 1888 and died in 1892.
