= Red House, Bexleyheath =

Arts and Crafts building owned by The National Trust

Red House
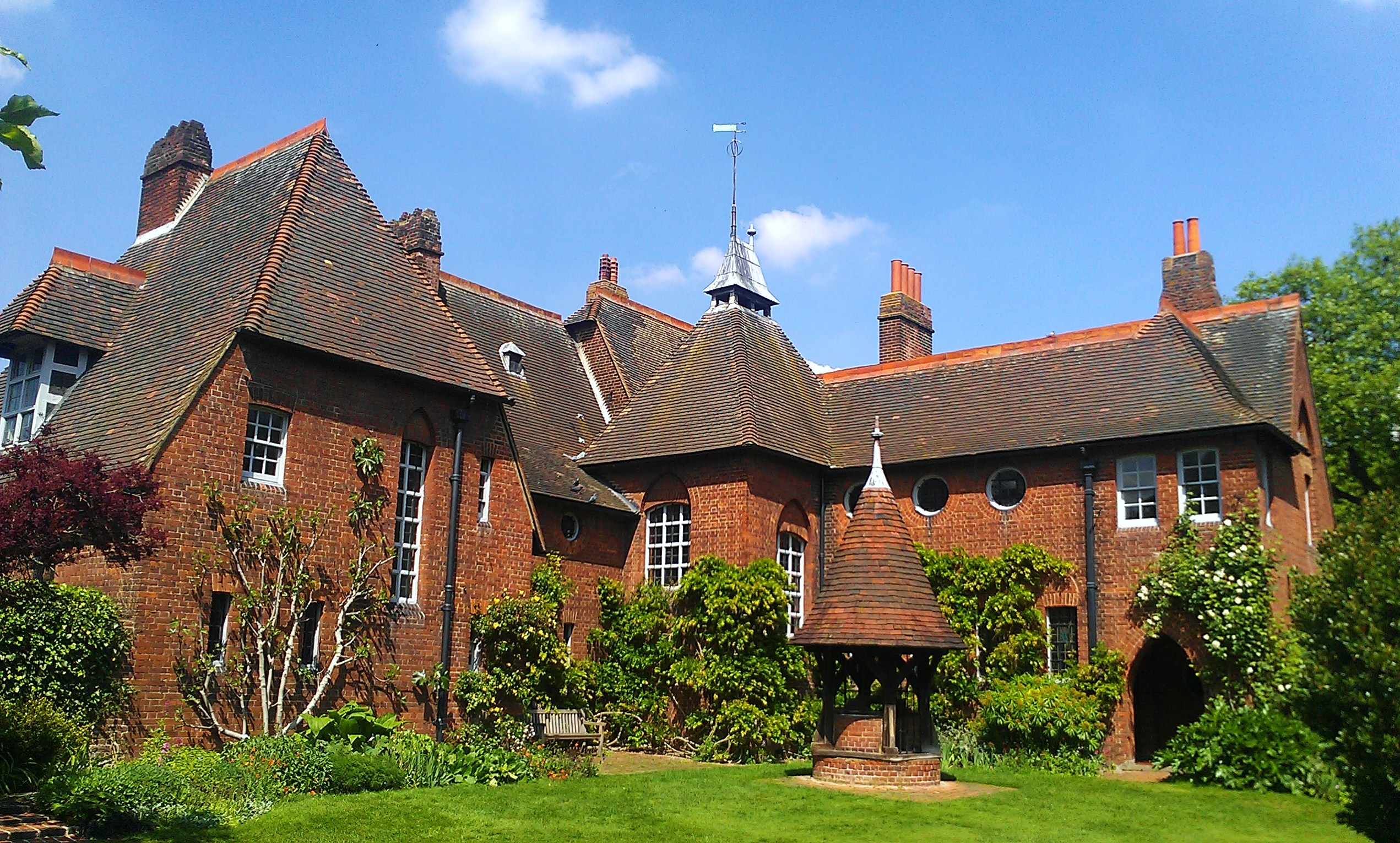
- View of Red House from the garden

- Location within London Borough of Bexley

General information
- Architectural style: Arts and Crafts
- Location: Red House Lane, Bexleyheath, London, England
- Coordinates: 51°27′20″N 0°7′49″E
- Completed: 1859
- Client: William Morris
- Owner: National Trust

Design and construction
- Architects: William Morris; Philip Webb
- Other designers: Edward Burne-Jones

Website
- nationaltrust.org.uk/redhouse

Red House is a significant Arts and Crafts building located in Bexleyheath, south-east London, England. Co-designed in 1859 by the architect Philip Webb and the designer William Morris, it was created to serve as a family home for Morris. Construction was completed in 1860.

Following an education at the University of Oxford, Morris decided to construct a rural house for himself and his new wife, Jane Morris, within a commuting distance of central London. Purchasing a plot of land in what at the time was the village of Upton in Kent, he employed his friend Webb to help him design and construct the house, financing the project with money inherited from his wealthy family. Morris was deeply influenced by medievalism and medieval-inspired neo-Gothic styles are reflected throughout the building's design, which he described as being "very medieval in spirit." It was constructed using Morris' ethos of craftsmanship and artisan skills and is an early example of what came to be known as the Arts and Crafts movement.

A number of Morris' friends visited, most notably the Pre-Raphaelite painters Edward Burne-Jones and Dante Gabriel Rossetti, both of whom aided him in decorating the house; various Burne-Jones wall murals remain. While at Red House, Morris was involved in the formation of his design company, Morris, Marshall, Faulkner & Co., and embarked on his earliest wallpaper designs. It was also here that his two daughters, Jenny and May, were born. Although initially intending to live there for the rest of his life, Morris found that the house proved too expensive to run and did not suit his lifestyle. After five years, he moved his family to a flat in Queen Square, Bloomsbury and sold the property.

Red House remained a private residence for various individuals from 1866 until 2002, during which period various alterations were made to the interior design. In 1950 it was designated a Grade I listed building by English Heritage. From 1952 to 1999 the architect Edward Hollamby lived at the house, initiating attempts at preservation and establishing the Friends of Red House charity in 1998. In 2003, the National Trust purchased the property, undertaking a project of conservation and maintaining it as a visitor attraction.

== William Morris at Red House ==
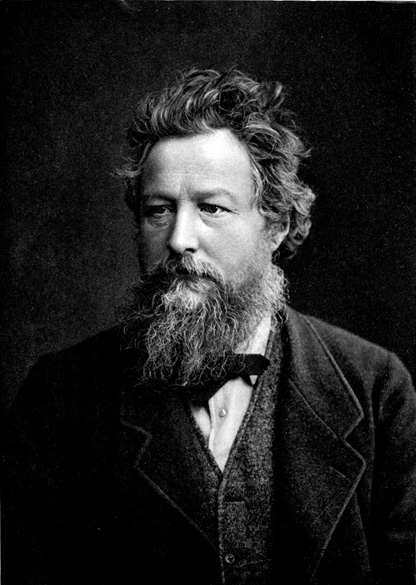
Photograph of William Morris

William Morris was born in Walthamstow, Essex, on 24 March 1834, and raised in a wealthy middle-class family. Although his father died in 1847, the Morris family remained affluent as a result of shares in the Devon Great Consols copper mines. In 1853 Morris began university studies at Exeter College, Oxford, focusing on Classics. There, he developed a keen interest in medieval history and medieval architecture, inspired by Oxford's many medieval buildings. This interest was tied to Britain's growing medievalist movement, a form of Romanticism that rejected many of the values of Victorian industrial capitalism. For Morris, the Middle Ages represented an era with strong chivalric values and an organic, pre-capitalist sense of community, both of which he deemed preferable to his own period. He was heavily influenced by the writings of art critic John Ruskin, being particularly inspired by his chapter "On the Nature of Gothic Architecture" in the second volume of The Stones of Venice. Morris adopted Ruskin's philosophy of rejecting the tawdry industrial manufacture of decorative arts and architecture in favour of a return to hand-craftsmanship, raising artisans to the status of artists, and creating art that should be affordable and hand-made, with no hierarchy of artistic mediums.

At Oxford, Morris became the best friend of fellow undergraduate Edward Burne-Jones; they had a shared attitude to life and a keen mutual interest in Arthurianism. Having passed his finals and been awarded a BA in 1856, Morris began an apprenticeship with the Oxford-based Gothic revival architect George Edmund Street in January 1856. There he was placed under the supervision of Philip Webb, who became a close friend. He soon relocated to Street's London office, in August 1856 moving into a flat in Bloomsbury, Central London with Burne-Jones. Morris was fascinated by London but dismayed at its pollution and rapid expansion into neighbouring countryside, describing it as "the spreading sore". Preferring rural life, Morris became increasingly fascinated with the Pre-Raphaelites and soon met one of the foremost Pre-Raphaelite painters, Dante Gabriel Rossetti, after Burne-Jones became Rossetti's disciple; the three soon became close friends. Through Rossetti, Morris came to associate with poet Robert Browning, and the artists Arthur Hughes, Thomas Woolner, and Ford Madox Brown. At Rossetti's recommendation, Morris and Burne-Jones moved in together to a flat at No. 17 Red Lion Square in Bloomsbury by November 1856. Morris designed and commissioned furniture for the flat in a medieval style, much of which he painted with Arthurian scenes in a direct rejection of mainstream artistic tastes.

In October 1857 Morris met Jane Burden, a woman from a working-class background, at a theatre performance and asked her to model for him. Smitten with her, they entered into a relationship and were engaged in spring 1858; Burden would later admit, however, that she never loved Morris. They were married in a simple ceremony held at St Michael at the North Gate church in Oxford on 26 April 1859, before honeymooning in Bruges, Belgium. Newly married, Morris decided to construct a house for himself and his bride. He commissioned Webb, who was then setting out as an architect independent of Street, to help him design it.

=== Origins and construction: 1859–60 ===
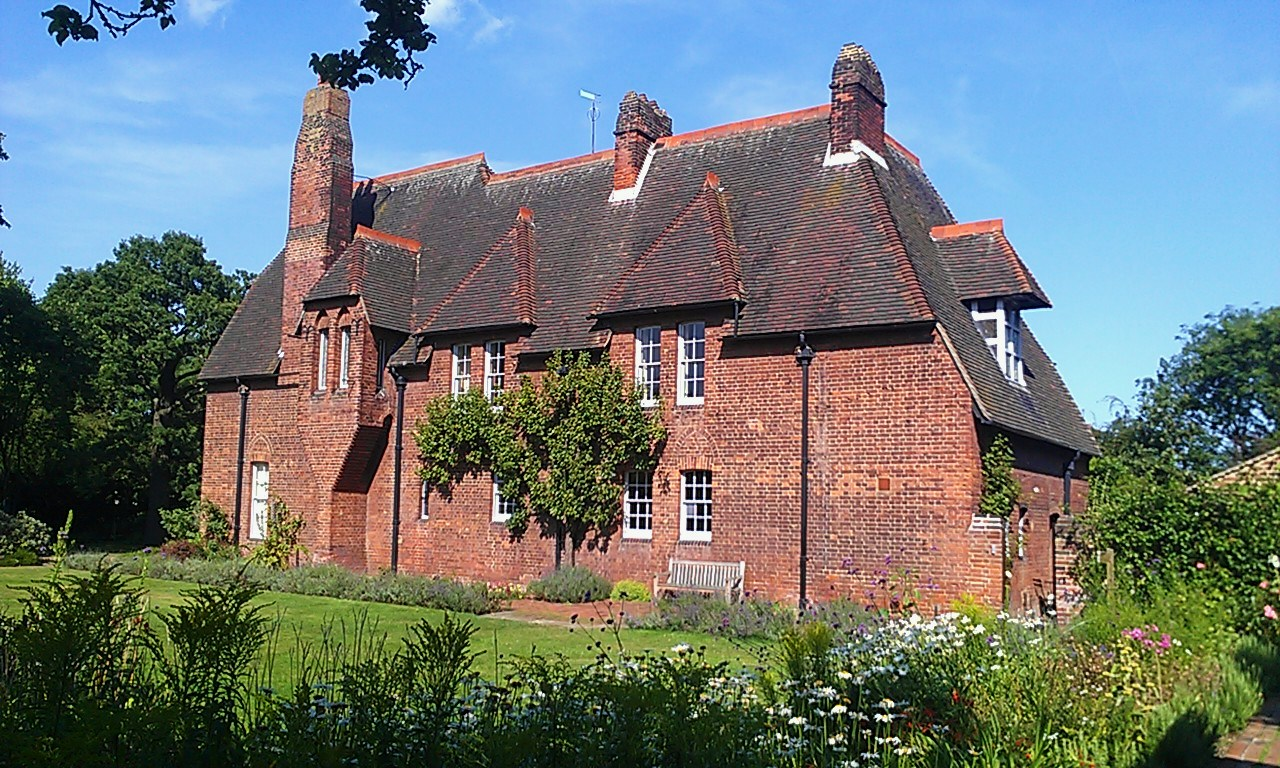
Side of Red House

Morris envisioned Red House as being not only a family home, but also a background to his ongoing artistic work. He wanted it to be situated in a rural area that was not far from London, and chose to search in Kent because it was his favourite county; he particularly enjoyed its geographical mix of large open spaces with small hills and rivers, favourably contrasting it to the flat expanse of his native Essex. After looking at various locations for sale in the area, he settled on a plot of land in the village of Upton in West Kent; although ten miles to London by road, it was situated three miles from the nearest railway station, Abbey Wood railway station. At Upton, Morris purchased an orchard and a meadow, wanting his new home to be surrounded by an apple and cherry orchard. Morris would likely have been pleased that Upton was close to the track that pilgrims followed to Canterbury Cathedral during the Middle Ages, and would also have had the opportunity to visit the ruins of the medieval Lesnes Abbey which were around three miles away.

While Red House was under construction, Morris and his wife lived in rented accommodations at 41 Great Ormond Street, just along the road from Webb's office, at 7 Great Ormond Street. However, as the project neared completion, the Morrises moved to Amberley Lodge, close to the site, so that Morris could monitor the builder's progress. Webb and Morris would work on the design of the house together. Thus, the National Trust have described it as "a complex fusion of Morris's romantic utopianism and Webb's practical common sense", while Edward and Doris Hollamby described it as "a collaborative effort in which we cannot separate one from the other". Red House would be Webb's first project as an independent architect, while it remained the only house that Morris ever built. The actual construction was given to a contractor, and the structure took a year to build. It cost Morris approximately £4,000, at a time when the value of his shares was dropping.

Unique in its design, Red House was designed to an L-shaped plan, with two stories and a high-pitched roof made of red tile. The large hall, dining room, library, morning room, and kitchen were located on the ground floor, while on the first floor were situated the main living rooms, the drawing room, the studio, and the bedrooms. The servants' quarters were larger than in most contemporary buildings, reflecting the embryonic ideas regarding working class conditions which would lead Morris and Webb to become socialists in later life. Windows were positioned to suit the design of the rooms rather than to fit an external symmetry; thus a variety of different window types are present, including tall casements, hipped dormers, round-headed sash-windows, and bull's eye windows. The house lacked any applied ornamentation, with its decorative features instead serving constructional purposes, such as the arches over the windows, and the louvre in the open roof over the staircase. According to Morris' biographer J.W. Mackail, the external design of the house was "plain almost to severity, and depended for its effect on its solidity and fine proportion." This was somewhat radical at the time, as most contemporary buildings were heavily furnished with ornamentation. Rossetti termed it "a real wonder of the age ... which baffles all description", while Morris biographer Fiona MacCarthy described it as "the ultimate Pre-Raphaelite building".

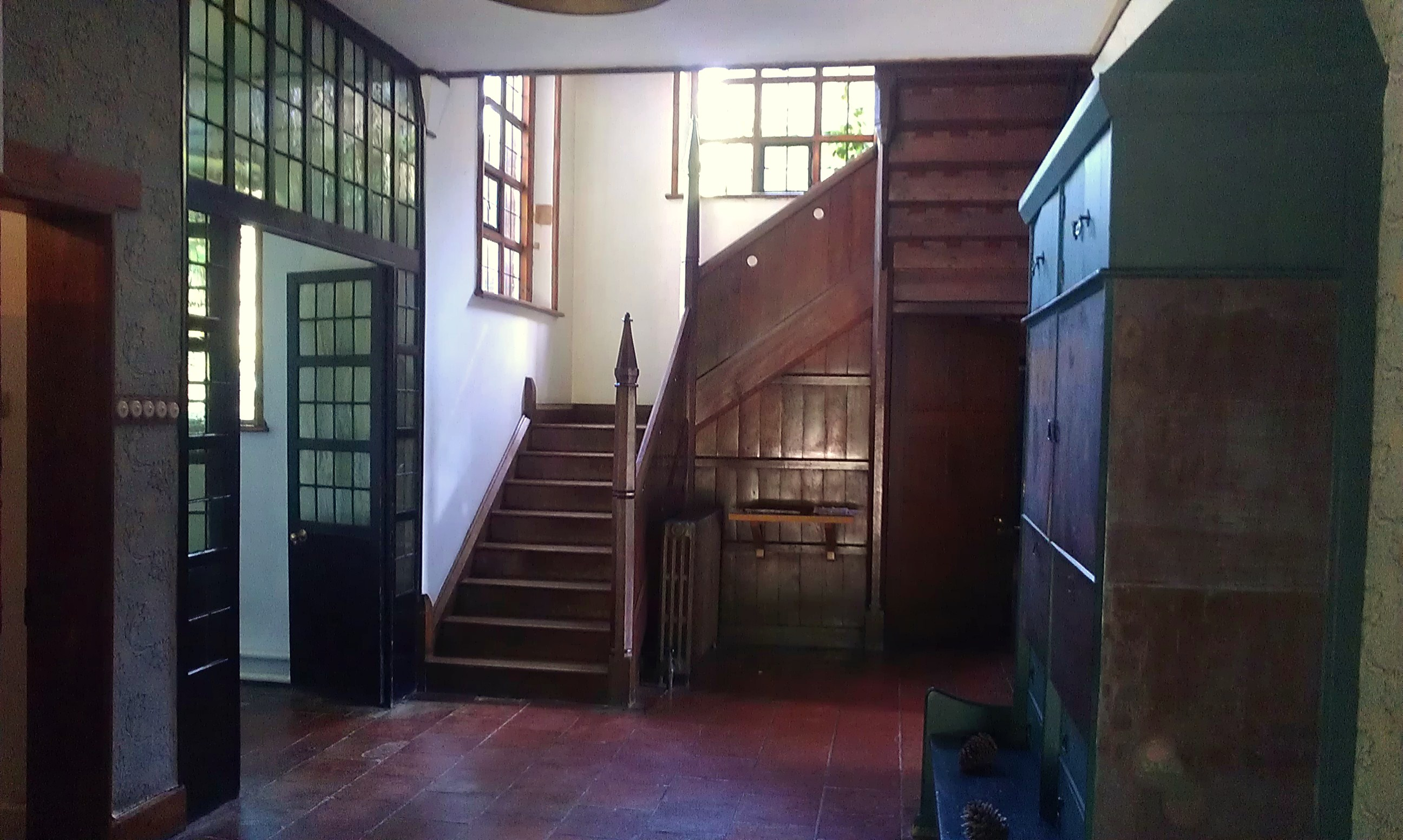
Red House's hallway and neo-Gothic staircase

The architecture of Red House was inspired by styles of British design from the thirteenth century, and Morris described the building as being "very mediaeval in spirit". Historian E.P. Thompson asserted that the house "was built, not–as in previous Gothic revivals–in an attempt to combine a number of superficial medieval characteristics which pleased the taste of the architect, but in a definite attempt to adapt late Gothic methods of building to the needs of the nineteenth century." Later owners of the property, Edward and Doris Hollamby, described Red House as Webb and Morris' attempt to "apply Gothic principles to domestic architecture without archaeological imitation". While asserting that it was certainly "a far cry from the Victorian bourgeois norm", MacCarthy stated that it was "by no means a revolutionary building", having much in common with other neo-Gothic buildings of the period, comparing its "complicated dense" interiors to those of the architect Augustus Pugin.

When the building itself had been constructed, Morris set about decorating the interior, however specifically chose to design and create almost everything himself. Only a few pieces of decor were pre-bought as ready-made items, namely the Persian carpets, and blue china or delft. Morris took his painted settle from the Red Lion Square flat and had it transported in pieces to Red House, where it was reassembled in the drawing room. Many other items of furniture were specially designed by Webb, including the oak dining table, other tables, chairs, cupboards, copper candlesticks, fire dogs, and glass tableware. The plastered walls and ceilings were given simple designs in tempera, although more complex designs were planned for the hall and main living rooms. Stained glass windows were installed in the house, with designs created by Burne-Jones and Webb. In reference to the route taken by medieval pilgrims headed to Canterbury, Morris termed the passage which connects the main hallway to the house's rear entrance, "The Pilgrim's Rest". The garden was similarly unique in its design, with Morris insisting on integration of the design of the house and garden; the latter was divided into four small square gardens by trellises on which roses grew. The flower beds were bordered with lavender and rosemary while lilies and sunflowers had also been planted in the garden. White jasmine, roses, honeysuckle and passion flower were planted to climb up the walls of the house.

=== Morris' life at Red House: 1860–1865 ===
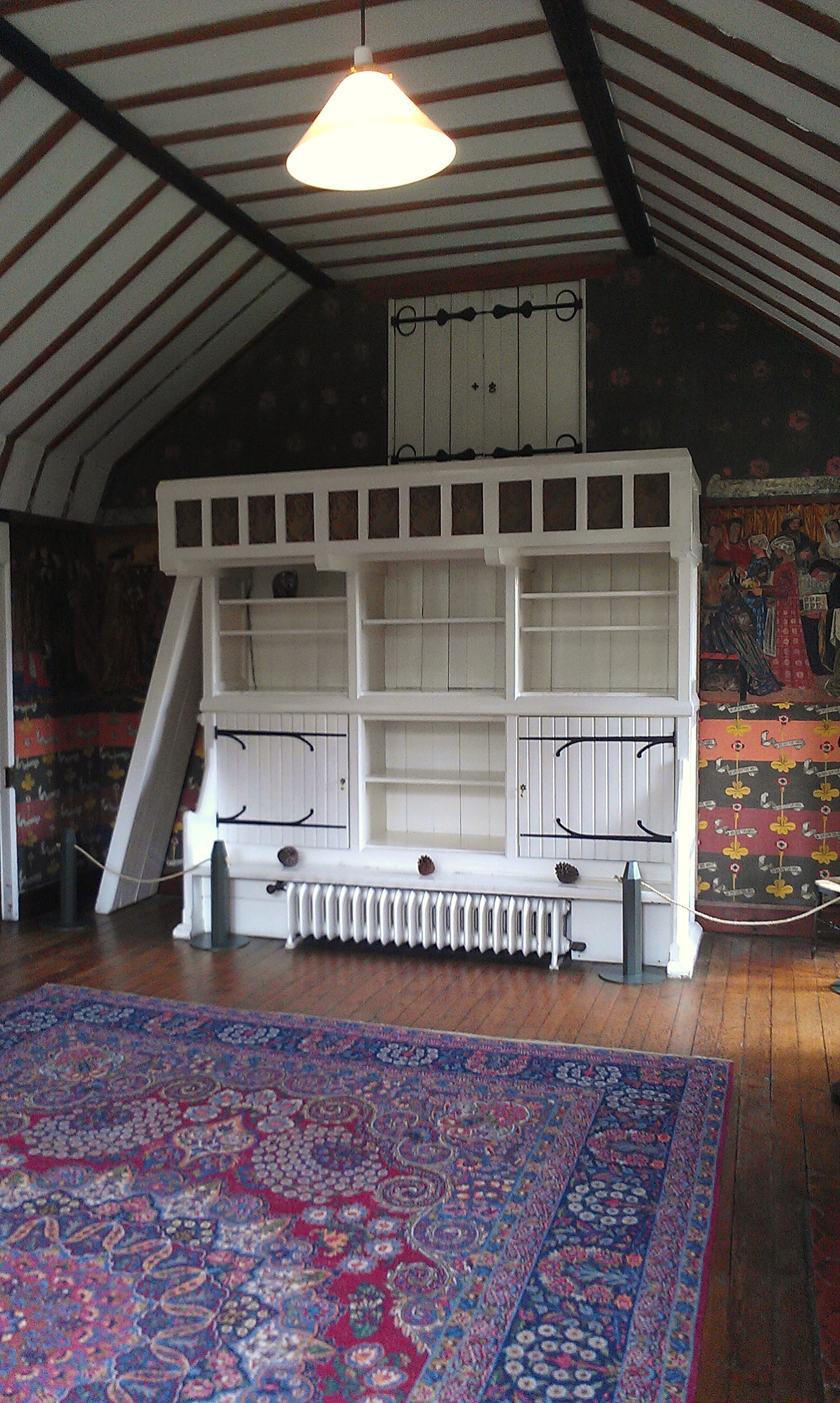
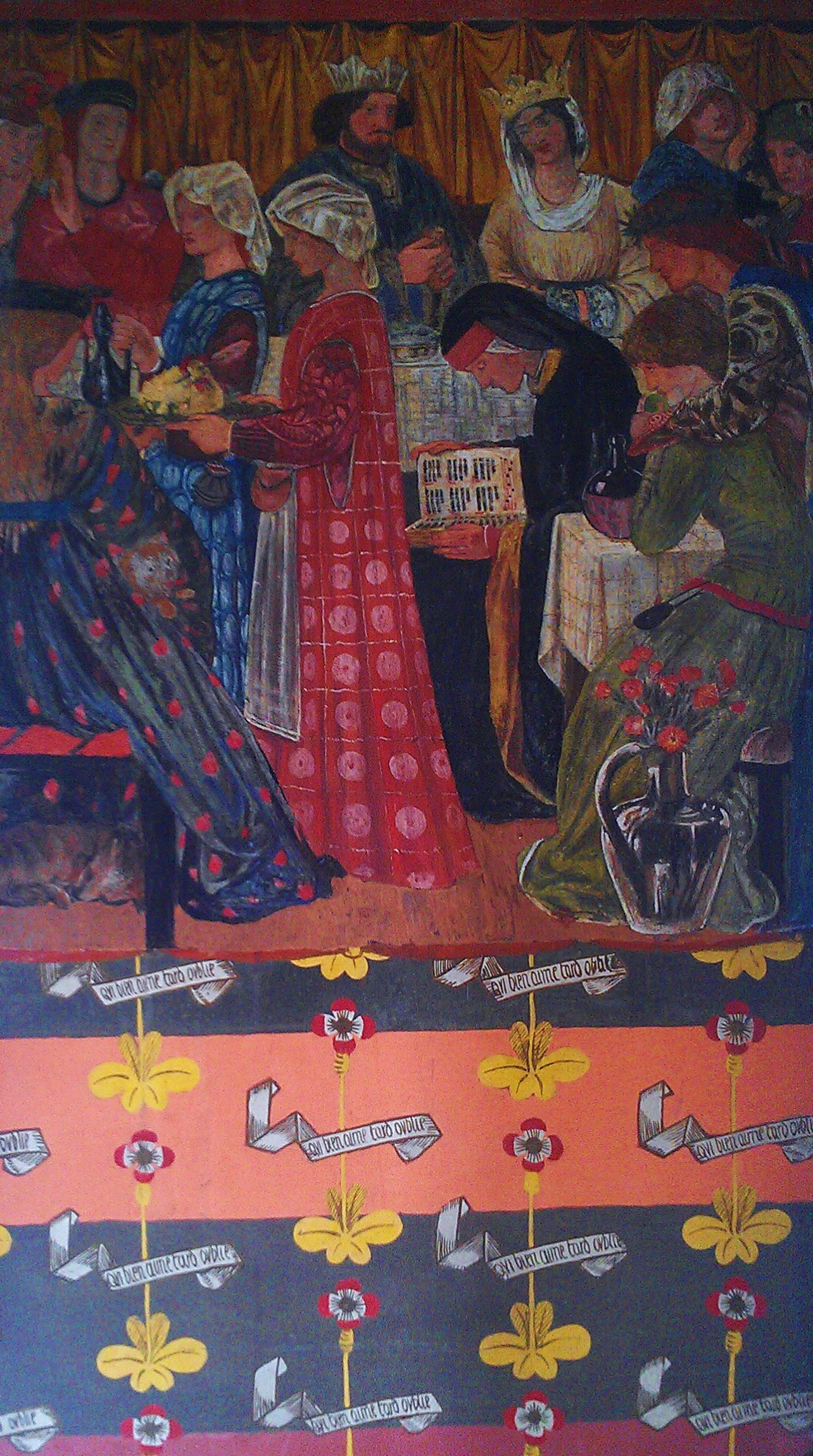
Left: the settle in the drawing room, with Burne-Jones murals to either side. Right: the Burne-Jones memorial depicting the marriage feast of Sir Degrevant.

Morris and his wife moved into Red House at the end of the summer of 1860. At the time, he envisioned living there for the rest of his life, although ultimately would only stay there for five years. Morris' friends regularly came to visit; Burne-Jones and his new bride, Georgiana Burne-Jones, would often spend their Sundays at Red House, while other regular visitors included Rossetti, Faulkner and his two sisters, Webb, Swinburne, Madox Brown, and Arthur Hughes. Here, Burne-Jones and Faulkner often played practical jokes on Morris, for instance, doctoring a pack of playing cards or sewing up his clothing to make it feel much tighter. The group of friends liked to play hide and seek at the house, and in the evenings would gather around the piano to sing songs.

It was at Red House that Morris and Janey's two children were born; in January 1861, a daughter named Jane Alice Morris, who would come to be known as "Jenny". Jenny was followed in March 1862 by the birth of their second daughter, Mary "May" Morris. Morris was a caring father to his daughters, and years later they both recounted having had idyllic childhoods. However, there were problems in Morris's marriage as Janey became increasingly close to Rossetti, who often painted her. It is unknown if their affair was ever sexual, although by this point other members of the group were noticing Rossetti and Janey's closeness. Morris also hired various servants, four of whom were cited as living in the house in the 1861 census; the cook Charlotte Cooper, the housemaid Jane Chapman, the nanny Elizabeth Reynolds, and the groom Thomas Reynolds.

Morris added to both the house's interior and the design of the garden intermittently over the years, aided by his various friends. There was to be no wallpaper anywhere in the house, with the walls instead being painted or covered by tapestries. The walls of the staircase were intended to feature a painted mural by Burne-Jones depicting scenes from the Trojan War, while on the wall of the hall beneath was intended to be a picture of warships carrying the ancient Greek soldiers to Troy. Although depicting scenes from Classical mythology, Morris had wanted the designs to be medieval in style, with the warships being based on those of the fourteenth century. On the hallway cupboard, Morris began (although never finished) a painting based on Thomas Malory's tale of how Sir Lancelot brought Sir Tristan and La Belle Iseult to the castle of the Joyous Garde. The figures themselves are depictions of some of Morris' friends, among them Jane, Faulkner, the Burne-Joneses, and Lizzie Siddel. In the dining room, Morris planned to decorate the walls with a series of embroidered female heroines, based on Geoffrey Chaucer's The Legend of Good Women. Produced by Jane and her sister Bessie, only seven or eight were completed.

Around the walls of the drawing room, Morris had wanted a mural featuring a series of scenes from the fifteenth-century Middle English romance of Sir Degrevant. Ultimately, three were executed by Burne-Jones, and survive today; they feature Morris as king and Jane as queen. Over the fireplace, Morris had inscribed a Latin motto, "Ars longa vita brevis", meaning "Life is short, but art endures." The settle from Red Lion Square was installed here, on top of which was fashioned a minstrels' gallery designed for Christmas concerts. Designs were pricked into the ceilings and then painted with simple, bold patterns. Commenting on the designs being introduced by his friend, in February 1862 Burne-Jones wrote that "Top [i.e. Morris] thrives through bandy, and is slowly making Red House the beautifullest place on Earth."

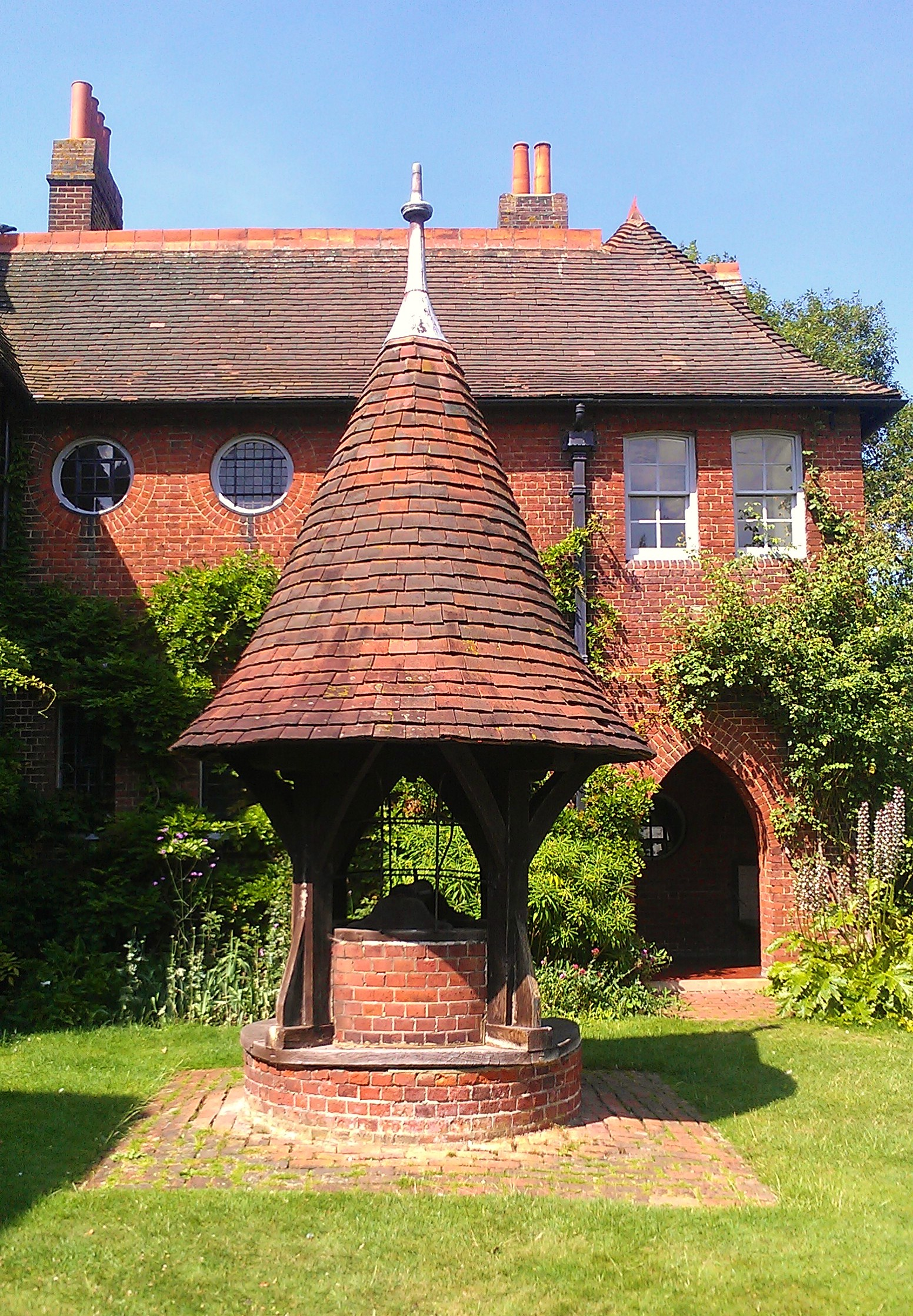
The well in the grounds of Red House

It was while living at Red House, in April 1861, that Morris co-founded a decorative arts company, Morris, Marshall, Faulkner & Co., with six other partners: Burne-Jones, Rossetti, Webb, Ford Madox Brown, Charles Faulkner, and Peter Paul Marshall. Operating from premises at No. 6 Red Lion Square, they referred to themselves as "the Firm" and were intent on adopting Ruskin's ideas of reforming British attitudes to production. They hoped to reinstate decoration as one of the fine arts and adopted an ethos of affordability and anti-elitism. For additional staff, they employed boys from the Industrial Home for Destitute Boys in Euston, central London, many of whom were trained as apprentices. Although working within the neo-Gothic school of design, they differed from neo-Gothic architects like Gilbert Scott who simply included certain Gothic features on modern styles of building; instead they sought to return completely to medieval Gothic methods of craftsmanship.

The products created by the Firm included furniture, architectural carving, metalwork, stained glass windows, and murals. Their stained glass windows proved a particular success in the firm's early years as they were in high demand for the surge in the neo-Gothic construction and refurbishment of churches, many of which were commissioned by the architect George Frederick Bodley. Despite Morris's anti-elitist ethos, the Firm soon became increasingly popular and fashionable with the bourgeoisie, particularly following their exhibit at the 1862 International Exhibition in South Kensington, where they received press attention and medals of commendation. However, they faced much opposition from established design companies, particularly those belonging to the neoclassical school.

Although the Firm was becoming more successful, it did not generate large profits in its early years. Mackail suggests that as a result, the Morris family were placed under increasing financial strain as they attempted to retain the lavish lifestyle to which they had become accustomed. Morris was also considering expanding operations at Upton by moving the Firm's workshops to the village. As part of this, he formulated a plan for a second wing of Red House to be constructed, to house the Burne-Jones family. Although Burne-Jones agreed and together they began to organise the design of the new house, these were disrupted when Georgiana contracted scarlet fever, resulting in the miscarriage of her second child. The plans were subsequently scrapped. It has been suggested that Burne-Jones may also have been loath to move from London at the time because his artistic career was becoming increasingly successful, and most of his contacts within the art world were in the city. Morris was deeply disappointed with this, writing to Burne-Jones: "As to our palace of art, I confess your letter was a blow to me at first, though hardly an unexpected one: in short I cried, but I have got over it now; of course I see it from your point of view".

=== Leaving Red House: 1865 ===
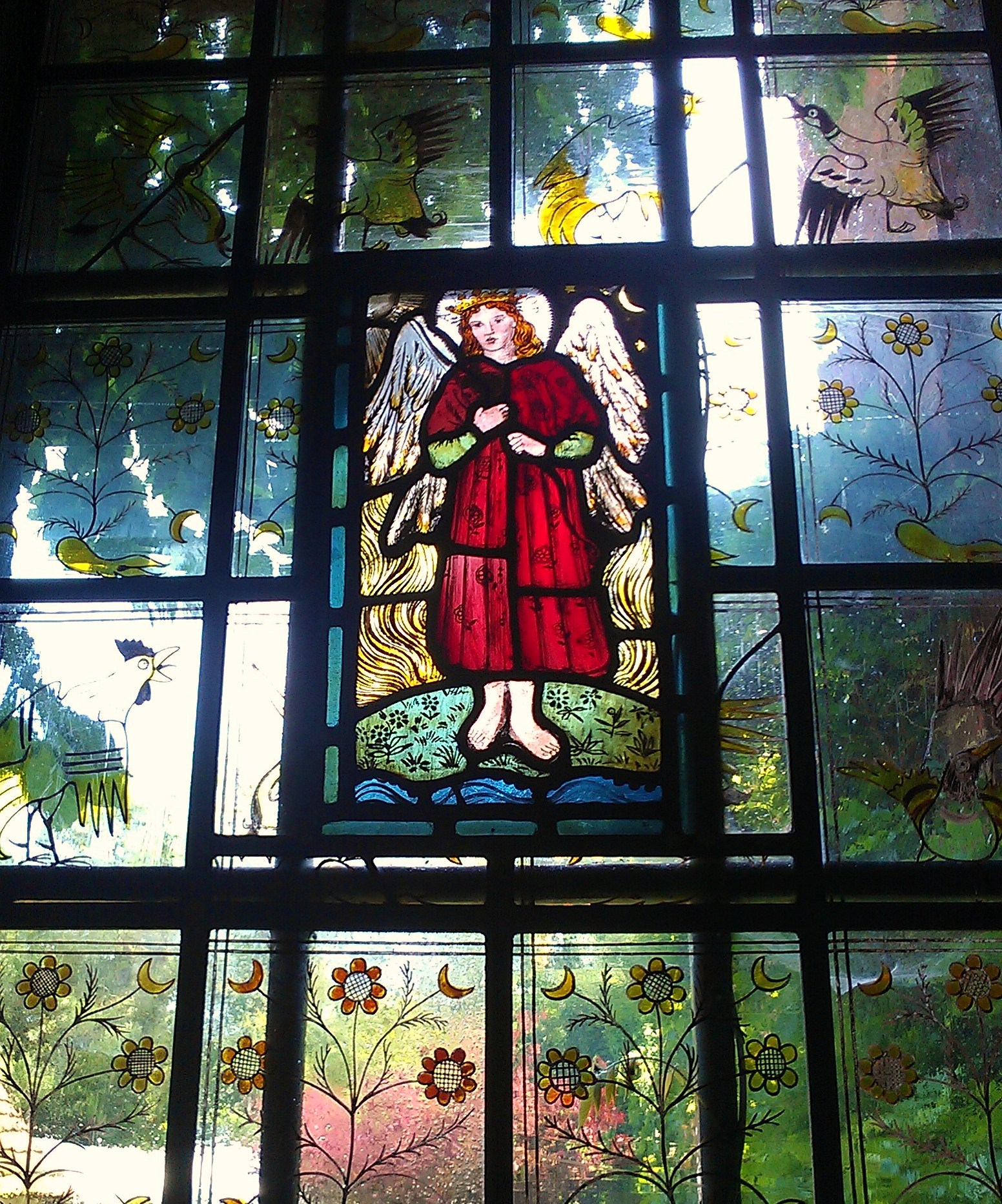
Stained-glass window on the theme of "Love" at Red House

With the collapse of his ideas regarding Upton becoming the base for the Firm's operations, Morris began to recognise various problems with the property. Being north-facing, the interior of the house was cold during winter, which aggravated Morris' various medical conditions, and its isolated location made it difficult for doctors to visit. The three-mile commute by carriage from the house to Abbey Wood railway station over an exposed and windy plateau further aggravated him, as did the daily commute from Abbey Wood to the Firm's offices in Bloomsbury, which took up three to four hours a day. Although various authors on the subject have asserted that there were financial considerations encouraging Morris to leave, it has been established that in 1865 Morris' dividends from his shares were higher than at any point since 1857.

Morris decided to move out of Red House and sell the property rather than rent it out, although no immediate purchaser appeared. He moved with his family to Queen Square in Bloomsbury in autumn 1865. Those pieces of furniture which proved too difficult to move to their new abode were left in Red House, where some of them are still present. Morris never returned to visit Red House, commenting that the sight of it would be too emotional for him. Nevertheless, Mackail described the five years that Morris lived at Red House as being "probably the happiest and not the least fruitful of his life."

== After Morris ==
Morris had been unable to find a buyer for Red House, and agreed to let it for £95 per annum to a retired commander in the Indian Navy named James Arnold Heathcote (1827–1877), who moved into the house in spring 1866. Having served at the siege of Multan, Heathcote had gone on to become a specialist in maritime surveying, marrying Eliza Margarita Burton and with her having two children, Marion and Rennie. After retirement he returned to England, moving to Red House with two servants. They also purchased pieces of Morris' furniture that were in the house; two of Morris' chairs remained in the Heathcote family until 1997, when they were sold at Christie's auction house in London to the Delaware Art Museum in Wilmington. After Heathcote's death at the house, it was purchased from Morris by a wealthy stockbroker, Edmund Charlesworth (1831–1890), who lived there from 1879 to 1889 with his wife Marta and daughter Laura. The Charlesworth family decorated the house's studio with Morris' "Daisy" wallpaper, which remains in place to the present.

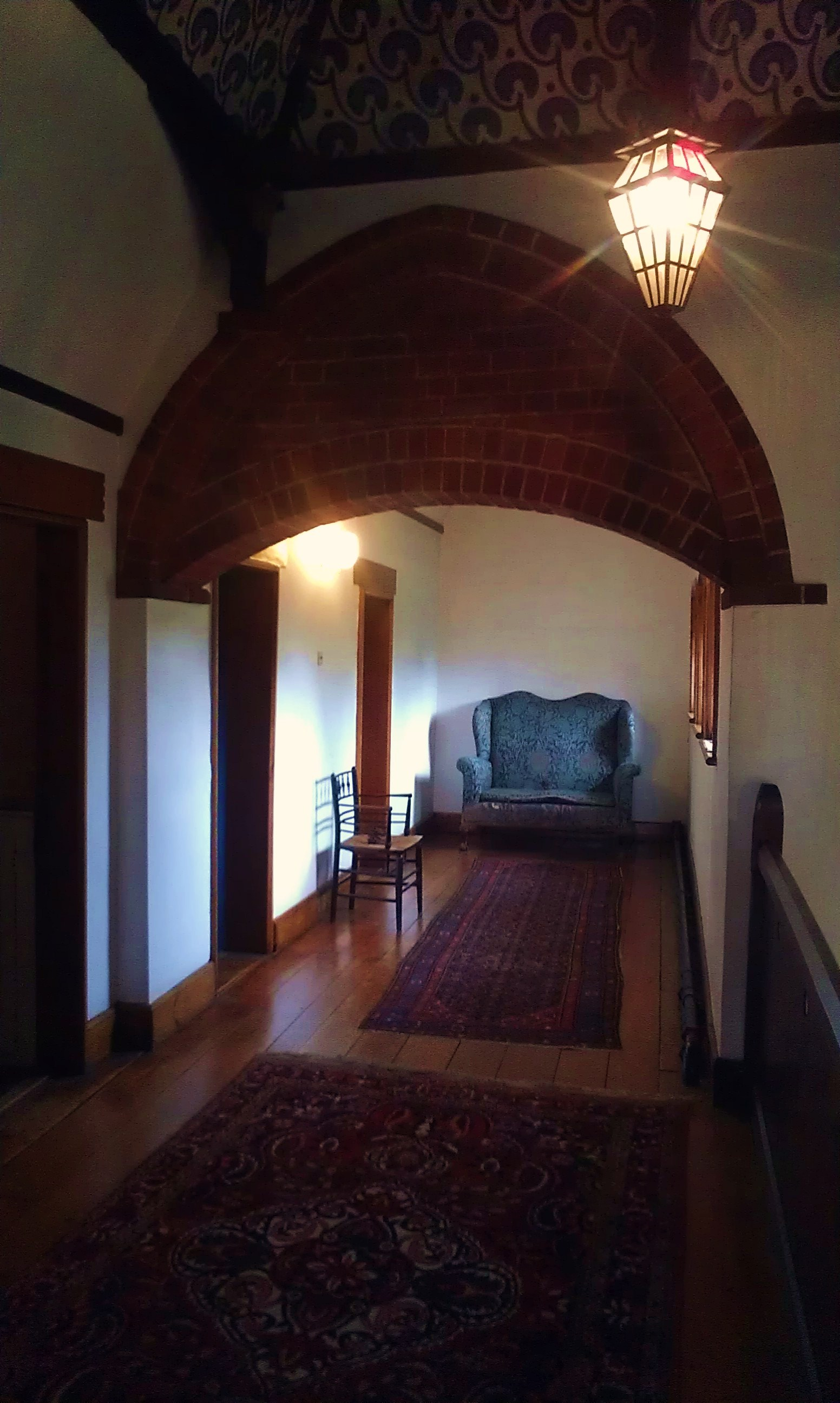
The upstairs hallway at Red House

In 1889 Charlesworth sold Red House for £2,900 to Charles Holme (1848–1923), who remained owner until 1903. Holme had become prosperous through a woollen business in Bradford before expanding into the Asian goods trade and by the 1880s he was employed as a buyer for the Liberty department store. Married to Clara Benton, they had three daughters and a son, who moved with him to the house. Holme admired Morris, and it was here in 1893 that he founded the arts magazine, The Studio, which gave importance to the Arts and Crafts movement. The earliest photographs of Red House date from the period in which it was occupied by Holme. He also contributed to the development of the building by encouraging visitors to scratch their signatures into the window panes on the screen dividing the entrance hall from the gallery with either a diamond ring or glass-scratching implement. He collected over one hundred signatures here, from family members, friends, and visitors. Notable names include those of May Morris and Georgina Burne-Jones on their visit in 1897, and the names of Japanese visitors who were in London to collect a battleship docked on the River Thames; among the latter was the future Japanese Prime Minister Saitō Makoto. This would be a tradition continued by some of the later owners, with the latest engraving dating to 1952.

In 1903, Red House was purchased by Henry Muff (1850–1910), a draper from Bradford who lived there with his wife Maude and their son Edward, who later became a noted architect. The Muffs were social activists involved in a number of progressive causes, with Maude being elected to Bexley Urban District Council in 1907, being the second woman in England to have been elected to a district council. In keeping with the fashions of the time, they introduced a lighter colour scheme throughout much of the house. Henry died at the house in 1910, although Maude continued to live there for another decade. In 1920, she began renting the property to Arthur James Sherwell (1863–1942), who had previously served as a Liberal Party member of parliament for Huddersfield from 1906 to 1918, positioning himself on the radical wing of the party. He moved to the house with his wife Amy Whadcoat, which they later purchased from Maude Muff.

In 1924, Sherwell sold Red House to Walter Scott Godfrey (1855–1936), the director of a wine and spirits merchant and an author on anti-theism who had been widowed two years previously. Of all the property's residents, he would live there for the shortest time, although he carried out one of the largest alterations, by removing the dividing wall between the downstairs waiting room and bedroom to create a study-cum-library and inserted a porthole window between this library and the Pilgrims' Rest, which was designed by his son, the architect Walter Hindes Godfrey. He lived at the house with his youngest daughter and three domestic servants, however he felt lonely at Red House and found its upkeep too expensive. In 1927 an Australian, Alfred Herbert Horsfall (1871–1944), purchased the house. A medical doctor, Horsfall had served as a medic in the British Army during the South African War, before moving to Britain and becoming a lecturer for the Social and Political Education League and staunch apologist for the British Empire. In the stock market crash of the early 1930s, Horsfall lost much of his money. He was unsuccessful in selling the house in 1932.

=== Threats and the Hollambys: 1934–2002 ===
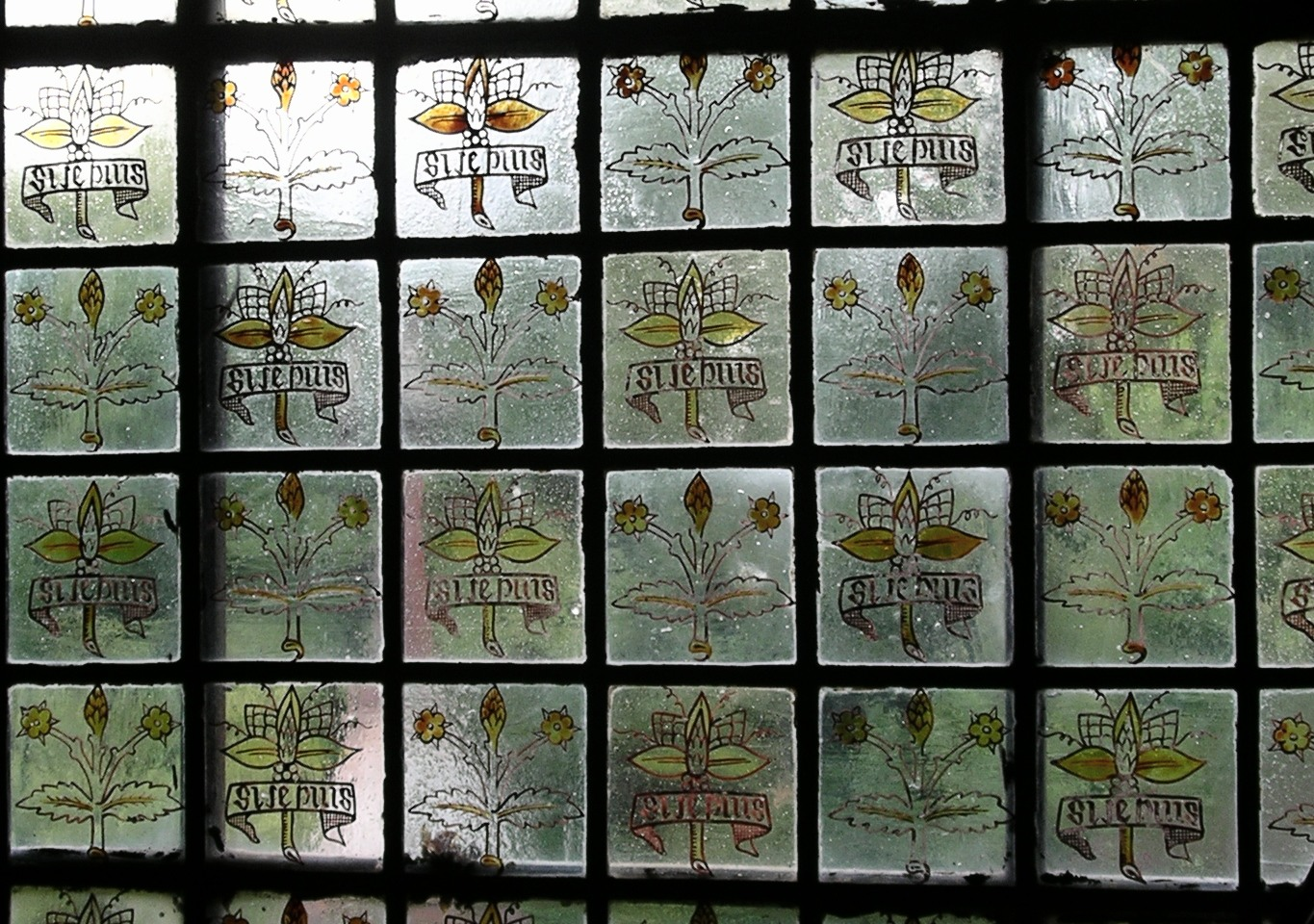
Window detail in Red House

Horsfall attempted to sell the house again in 1934, this time with Harrods; he put forward an asking price of £4,000. Many believed that the house would be demolished to make way for encroaching suburban development, so a campaign group emerged with the hope of preserving the house and donating it to The National Trust; founding a preservation committee, they launched an appeal to purchase the property, with Horsfall agreeing that he would be willing to sell it to them for £3,100. The group sought to raise this amount, gaining the support of writers like Rudyard Kipling, George Bernard Shaw, H. G. Wells, and John Masefield, and architects Edwin Lutyens, Giles Gilbert Scott, Herbert Baker, and Raymond Unwin, as well as the former Prime Minister Ramsay MacDonald. They asserted that "We realise that at the present time the public are interested in other and very different movements in architecture and industrial art. We are however confident that, for the sake of its association with the work of William Morris and his group, the importance of this house will be appreciated in the future, and its loss in this regard will be recognised as irreparable." By December 1934, the committee's appeal had only raised £550 and the Trust were unwilling to foot the rest of the bill. The committee returned the donations that had been offered. On learning of this, May Morris commented that "That beautiful house is fated to have bad luck, it seems!"

Red House was purchased by a local estate agent, Thomas Curtis Hills (c.1883–1957), in 1935. Aware of the threats posed to the house, he moved into it with his wife, Beatrice Nellie Foster. In 1941, during the Second World War, the government's Assistance Board took control of the house's ground floor, using it as an office to aid those left homeless by the Blitz. Commenting on this situation, a visitor to the building, Prime Minister of New Zealand Peter Fraser, stated that "I think Morris would be pleased to know that a house of his is being used for such a purpose. The house is being devoted to the service of the people and Morris was for the people all the time." An air raid shelter was constructed in the house's gardens for the use of the Assistance Board's staff. After the war, the house had fallen into a poor state and the Hills were keen to sell it. In 1950, they unsuccessfully attempted to sell it to the National Trust and then the Labour Party, before offering it for £5,000 to anyone "willing to preserve it for the nation". The same year, it was designated a Grade I [listed building] by English Heritage. At the same time, the wellhead in the garden, also designed by Webb, was given its own Grade I listing.

The couple moved out of the building in early 1951, and it was left empty for over a year; it was purchased for £3,500 by Richard "Dick" Toms (1914–2005) and Edward "Ted" Hollamby (1921–1999) in 1952.

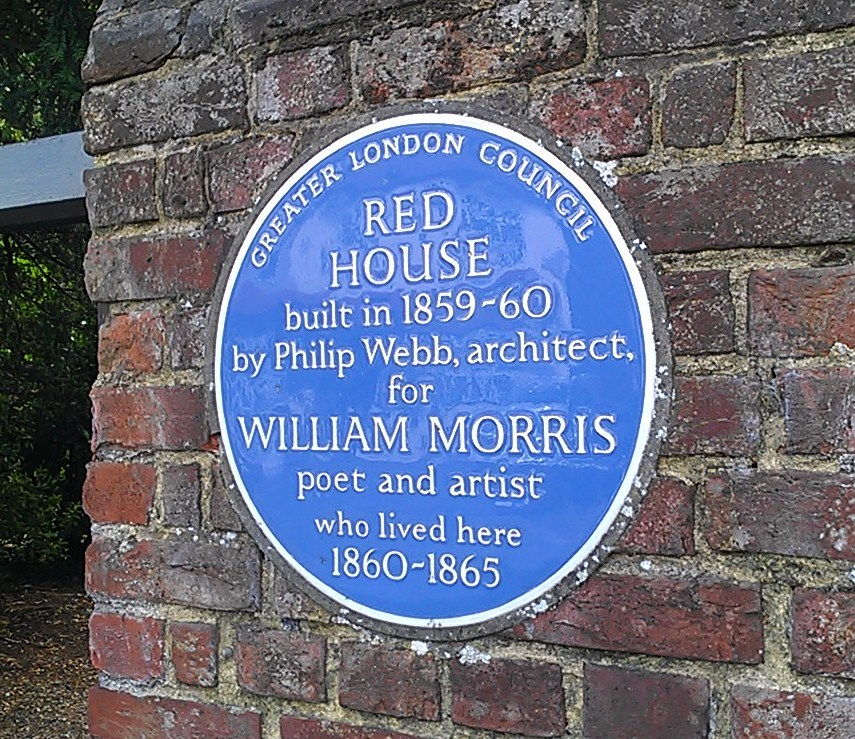
The blue plaque erected outside Red House

Both architects working for the London County Council, Toms and Hollamby had a keen interest in Morris and embraced his socialist ideals, being members of the Campaign for Nuclear Disarmament and the British-Soviet Friendship Society. Deciding to share the property between themselves, they were only able to afford a mortgage with the aid of a loan from Toms' father-in-law; he only agreed to provide the loan if the house was owned in Toms' name, and thus Hollamby became Toms' tenant. Both architects had wives – Mary Toms and Doris Hollamby – and children, and thus both families moved into the building in 1952, dividing the rooms among themselves, with the old kitchen being used as a communal dining room. In 1954, a third architect, David Gregory Jones, joined them at the house, and together they set about renovating much of the property. In 1957 the Toms moved out, desiring to live closer to central London, and they were replaced by Jean and David Macdonald; Jean was an architect who worked alongside Ted Hollamby, while David was an accountant and woodworker. Rearranging the former ownership arrangements, the Macdonalds and Hollambys agreed to legally own half of the property each. However, in 1964 the Macdonalds left and the Hollambys assumed sole ownership of the house.

In 1953, the newly founded William Morris Society held its inaugural meeting at Red House, subsequently holding a garden party there in 1960 to commemorate its centenary. After his retirement in 1985, Ted Hollamby decided to open the house up to visitors, offering guided tours on one Sunday per month. As the number of those attending such tours grew, especially in the 1996 centenary of Morris' death, Hollamby began to search for a way of securing future public access. In 1998 he helped to establish the Friends of Red House, a group of individuals who were largely members of the Bexley Civic Society, and who helped to maintain the house and its gardens as well as give tours to visitors. Hollamby died in 1999, and his wife left Red House to move to a care home in 2002.

=== National Trust ===
After Doris Hollamby put the house up for sale, an anonymous benefactor purchased it and donated it to the National Trust, who completed the purchase in 2003, with the Friends of Red House continuing to organise tours. Contributions from the William Morris Society and Bexley Council also aided the Trust in purchasing the building. It has since performed further restoration and research to restore the house as much as possible to its original condition. The house is open to the public, for guided tours, which must be advance-booked. In November 2004, the National Trust organised a seminar titled "Red House: Past and Future Lives" at the Art Workers' Guild at which various specialists in the house presented papers on the subject.

In 2013, a previously unknown mural depicting five figures from the Book of Genesis was discovered in Morris' bedroom at the house. It was believed that it resembled the joint work of Morris, Burne-Jones, Rossetti, Siddal, and Ford Madox Brown; as a result, the building's property manager James Breslin described the mural as being "of international significance".
