= Walter Godfrey =

Walter Godfrey may refer to:

- Walter Godfrey (architect) (1881–1961), English architect, antiquary, and historian
- Walter Godfrey (golfer) (born 1941), New Zealand golfer
- Sir Walter Godfrey (diplomat) (1907–1976), British diplomat
