= Lucy Faulkner Orrinsmith =

English tile painter (1839–1910)

- Born: Lucy Jane Faulkner; 16 November 1839; Birmingham, England
- Died: 25 January 1910 (aged 70); Hampstead, London
- Movement: Pre-Raphaelite Brotherhood Arts and Crafts movement

Lucy Jane Faulkner Orrinsmith (16 November 1839 – 25 January 1910) was a tile painter, engraver, and embroiderer during the Arts and Crafts Movement in England. She is best known for her hand-painted tiles of fairytales, especially of Sleeping Beauty, Beauty and the Beast, and Cinderella.

== Early life ==
Lucy Jane Faulkner was born to Benjamin and Ann Faulkner on 16 November 1839 in Birmingham, England. She had two surviving siblings, Charles Joseph Faulkner and Kate Faulkner. They lived in Birmingham until the death of their father, and moved to Bloomsbury after his death. It is unknown what caused his death.

Charles had become friends with William Morris when they were both students at Oxford, and through that friendship, Morris was also acquainted with Lucy and Kate.

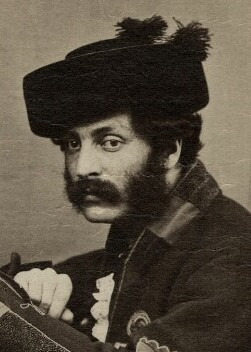
Her future husband Harvey Edward Orrinsmith in 1863.

She married a bookbinder and engraver, Harvey Edward Orrinsmith (son of John Orrin Smith), in 1870 and changed her surname in the middle of her artistic career.

== Artistic career ==
Lucy's brother Charles and their friend William Morris founded the company Morris, Marshall, Faulkner & Co., which specialized in home and furniture decoration. At first, Charles hired her and Kate as amateurs just to help with the company, but as they continued working and growing their skills, they were eventually received as legitimate artists and were paid for their labor and compensation. Lucy also became one of the first managers for the company.

While her sister Kate dabbled in nearly every aspect of home decorating (including embroidery, tile painting, engraving, gesso painting, and especially wallpaper design), Lucy focused more on painting tiles by hand, which is what she became best known for in the company and as an artist.

Lucy Faulkner Orrinsmith was mostly known for her tile paintings of women, particularly from fairytales and legends. Many of her tiles were themed after the Legende of Goode Wimmen, in which there are many depictions of women of classical antiquity. Along with this, she painted stories such as Sleeping Beauty, Cinderella, and Beauty and the Beast, which were painted in sequence to be hung as mantelpieces over the fireplace. Her paintings of the story of Sleeping Beauty are the more popular of the three stories.

After she married Harvey Edward Orrinsmith, she stopped painting tiles for Morris, Marshall, Faulkner & Co., and changed her surname from Faulkner to Orrinsmith. This is one of the primary reasons that she is overshadowed by her sister, Kate. For this reason, many of her works were previously mis-attributed to Kate Faulkner, until it was discovered that Lucy would sign her tiles with either LJF or simply LF.

Orrinsmith was also known for writing a book about drawing room decoration entitled The Drawing Room: Its Decorations and Furniture while living in Beckenham, simply under the name “Mrs. Orrinsmith”. In the book, she emphasizes the importance of “properly” decorating the elements of drawing rooms, including ceilings, walls, moldings, fireplaces, chimneys, skirting, and much more. She also emphasizes using colors that were popular at the time and delves a little into color theory. Lucy also illustrated diagrams depicting how to properly arrange elements within the room and how to decorate everything to look visually appealing to guests. Orrinsmith received plenty of negative criticism and reviews of her book, as many thought that she was very harsh, and that the illustrations that she included as diagrams were of poor quality and did not reflect the skill level that she lectured about in the book.

== Children, death and legacy ==
Lucy and Harvey Orrinsmith had two children, Ruth (b.1873) and Edward (b.1882). In 1901 Ruth married the architect Charles Evelyn Simmons, then a pupil and later a partner, from 1905-1915) of Horace Field.

Lucy died in 1910 of unknown causes. Most of her work is located at the William Morris Gallery in London, which has the largest surviving collection of her hand-painted tiles up on display.

== List of works ==
- Alceste tile, hand-painted tile, (c.1862), William Morris Gallery, London Borough of Waltham Forest.
- Sleeping Beauty, hand-painted tile panel, (c.1864-1865), Victoria and Albert Museum, London.
- Beauty and the Beast, hand-painted tile panel, (c.1863-64), William Morris Gallery, London Borough of Waltham Forest.
- Plate, hand-painted ceramic plate, William Morris Gallery, London Borough of Waltham Forest.
