= Kate Faulkner =

English artist and designer (1841–1898)

- Born: Kate Faulkner; 1841
- Died: 1898 (aged 56–57)
- Movement: Arts and Crafts movement Pre-Raphaelite Brotherhood

Kate Faulkner (1841–1898), was an Arts and Crafts artist and designer.

Kate Faulkner was an artist and designer from a family of artists and designers. She was a sibling of Lucy Faulkner Orrinsmith and Charles Joseph Faulkner, one of the founder members of Morris, Marshall, Faulkner & Co.

She practiced in a variety of media: wood engraving, embroidery, gesso painting, tile painting, wallpaper design, fabric design, and china painting.

Her work has historically been confused with, or obscured by, that of her sister, artist and author Lucy Faulkner Orrinsmith, because on occasion they worked in similar fields at roughly parallel times.

Her work was often collaborative, and she was highly skilled at interpreting the designs of other artists. For example, in 1883 she decorated a piano after a design by Edward Burne-Jones for the home of Alexander Constantine Ionides, one of the major patrons of the Pre-Raphaelite Brotherhood.

It is unclear which sister reinterpreted the wood block engraving for Dante Gabriel Rossetti's title page design for the second edition of Christina Rossetti's ‘Goblin Market and Other Poems’ (1865). At the time of the commission both Kate and her sister Lucy worked at the firm Smith and Linton's, which undertook the engraving.

== Sample list of works ==
1. Carnation, fabric pattern, block-printed cotton, 1875, Morris & Co. Victoria & Albert Museum, South Kensington, London.
2. Mallow, wallpaper pattern, colour block print on paper, 1879, Morris & Co. Victoria & Albert Museum, South Kensington, London.
3. Plate, earthenware with hand-painted glaze, 1880, Pinder, Bourne and Co. Victoria & Albert Museum, South Kensington, London.
4. Carnation, wallpaper pattern, colour block print on paper, 1880, Morris & Co. Victoria & Albert Museum, South Kensington, London.
5. Grand piano, oak, stained with gold and silver-gilt gesso, 1883, based on a design by Edward Burne-Jones. Victoria & Albert Museum, South Kensington, London.
