= Louis XVI style =

Neoclassical style within architecture and design

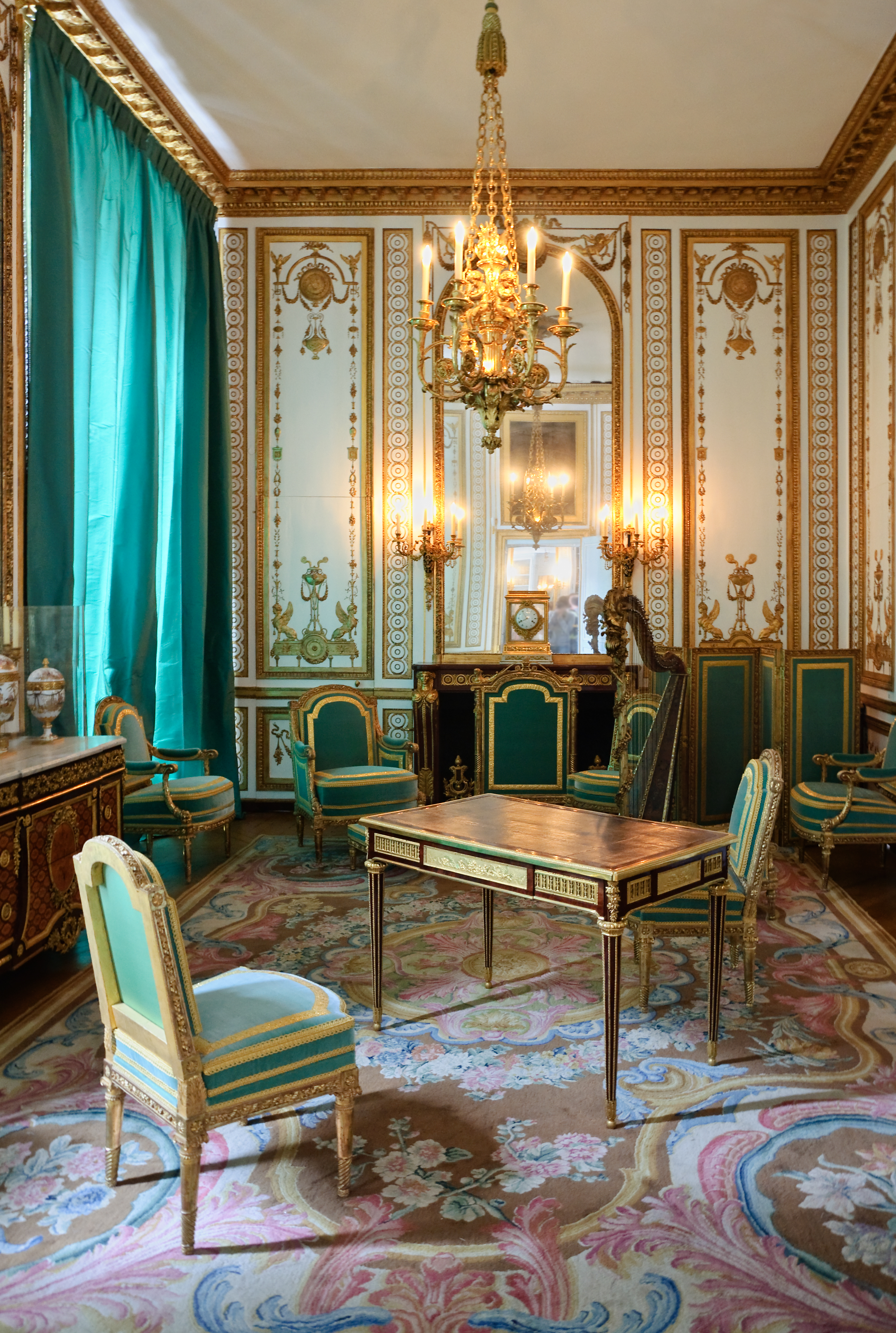
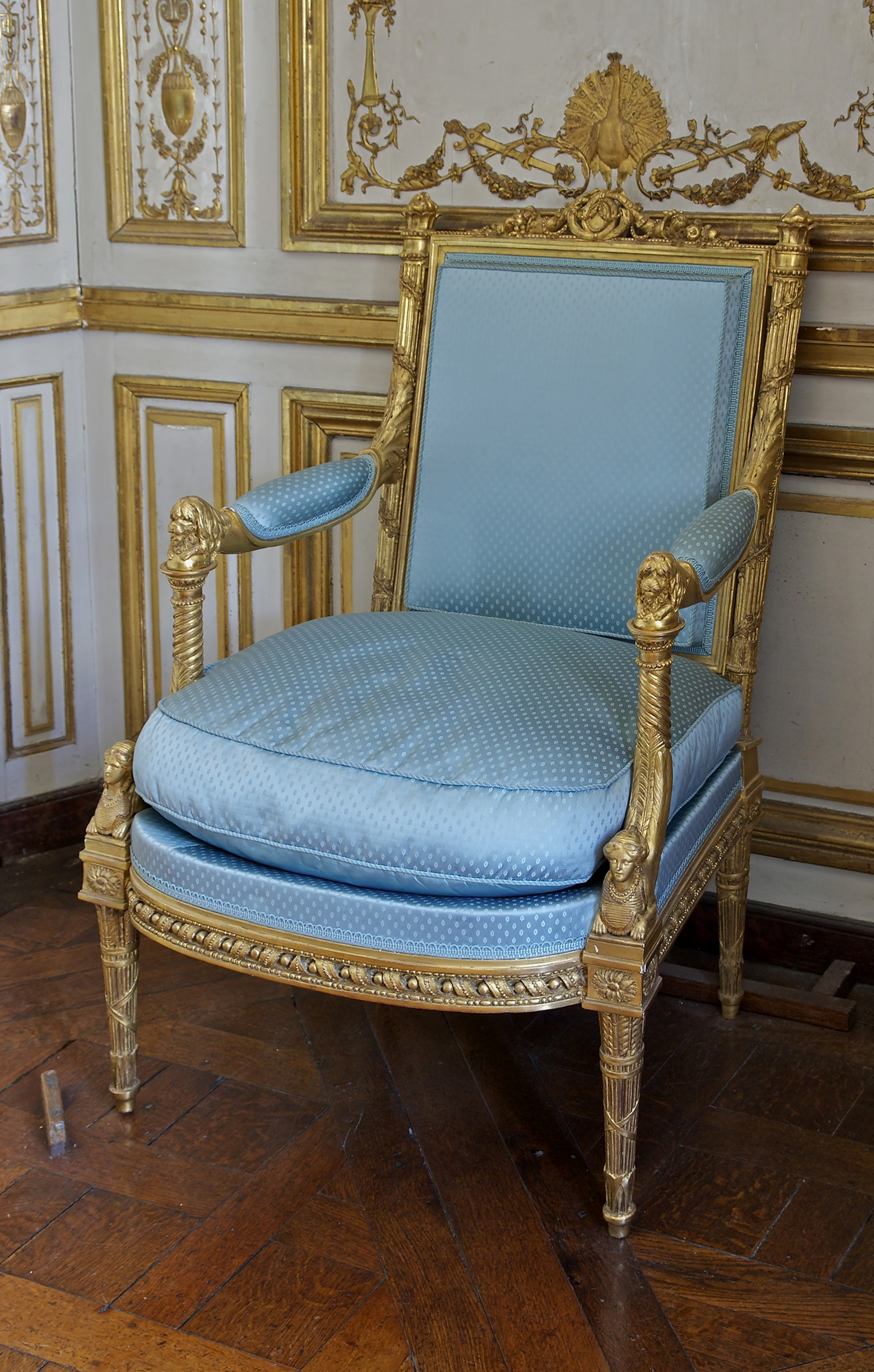
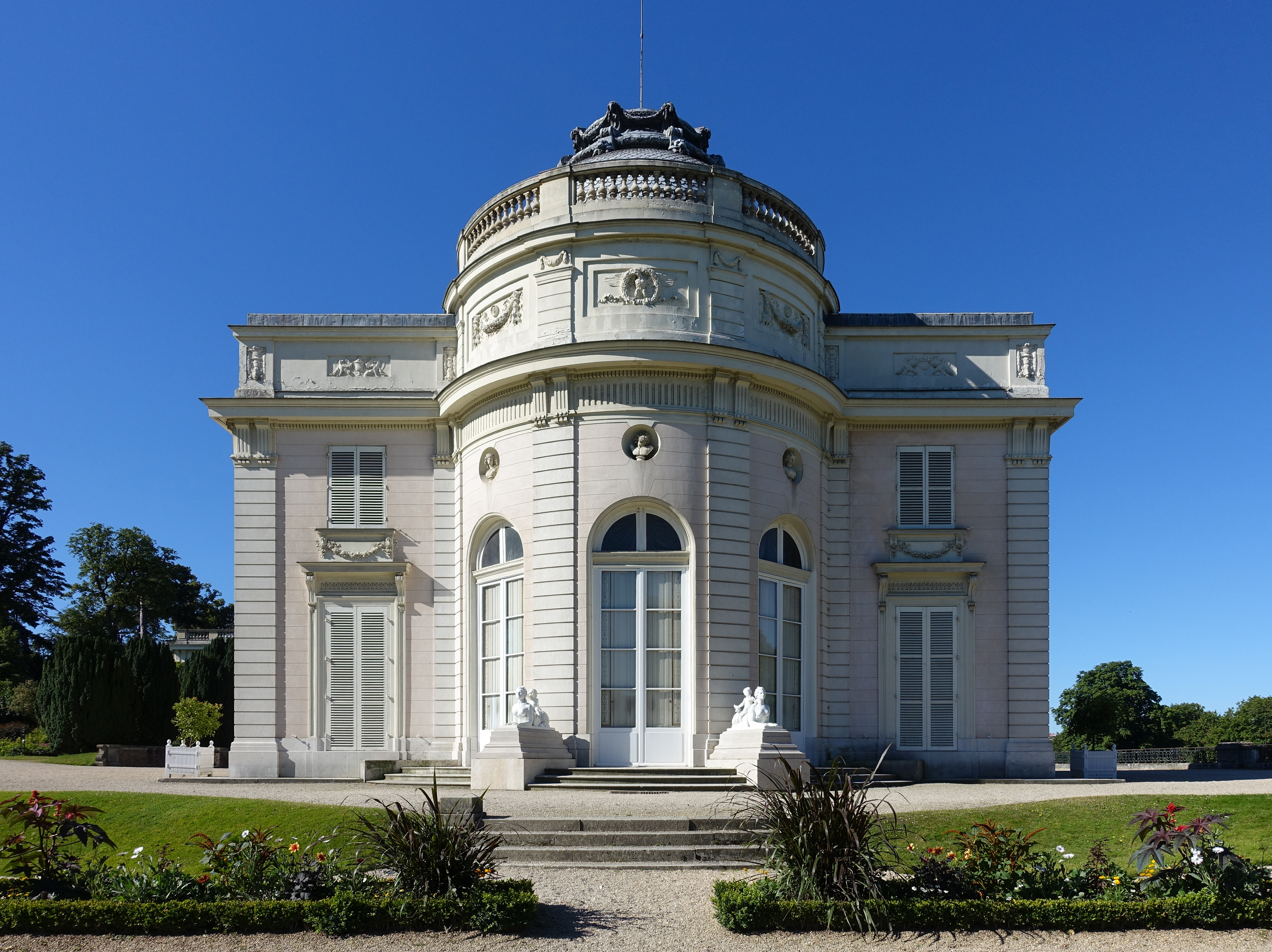
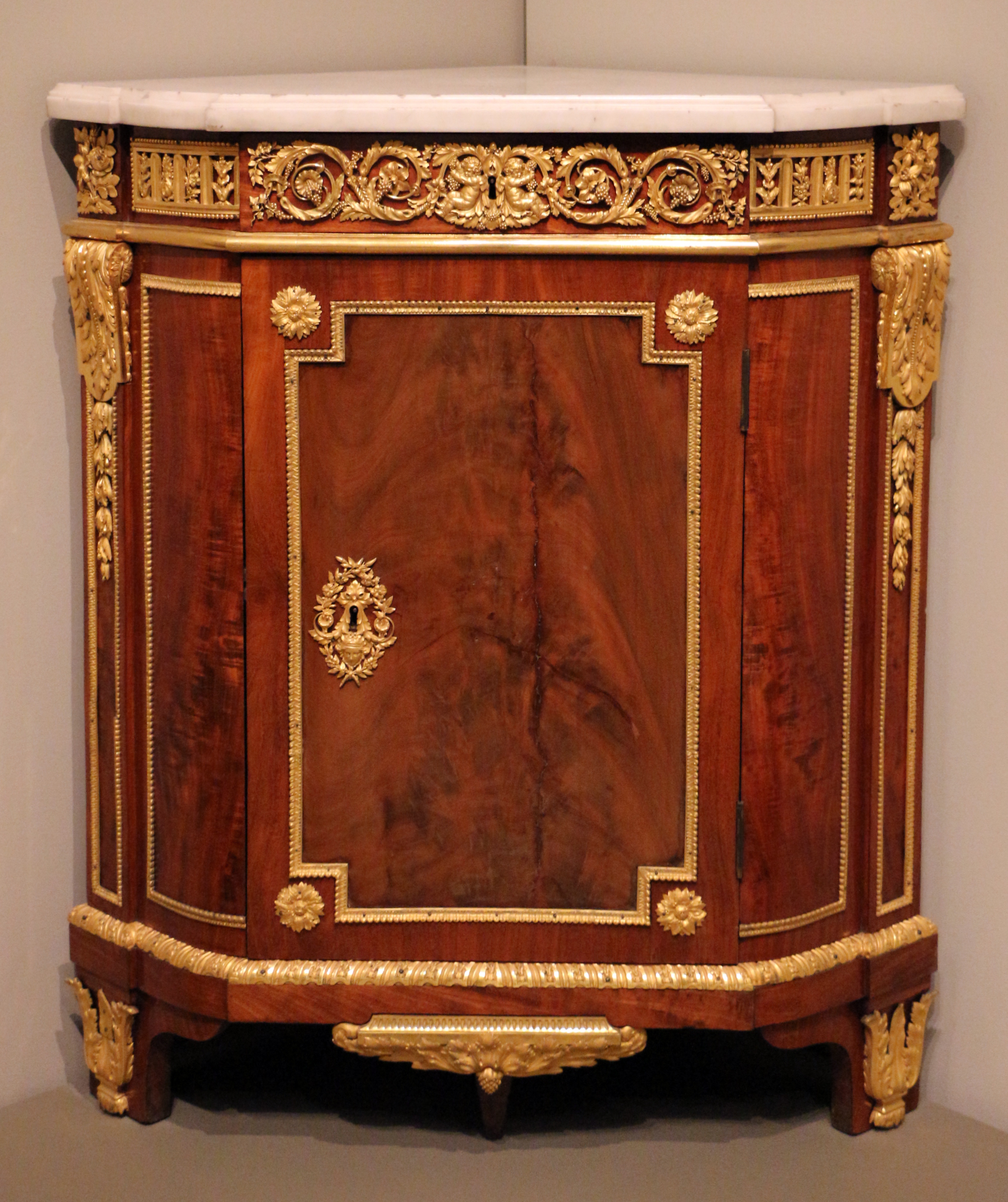
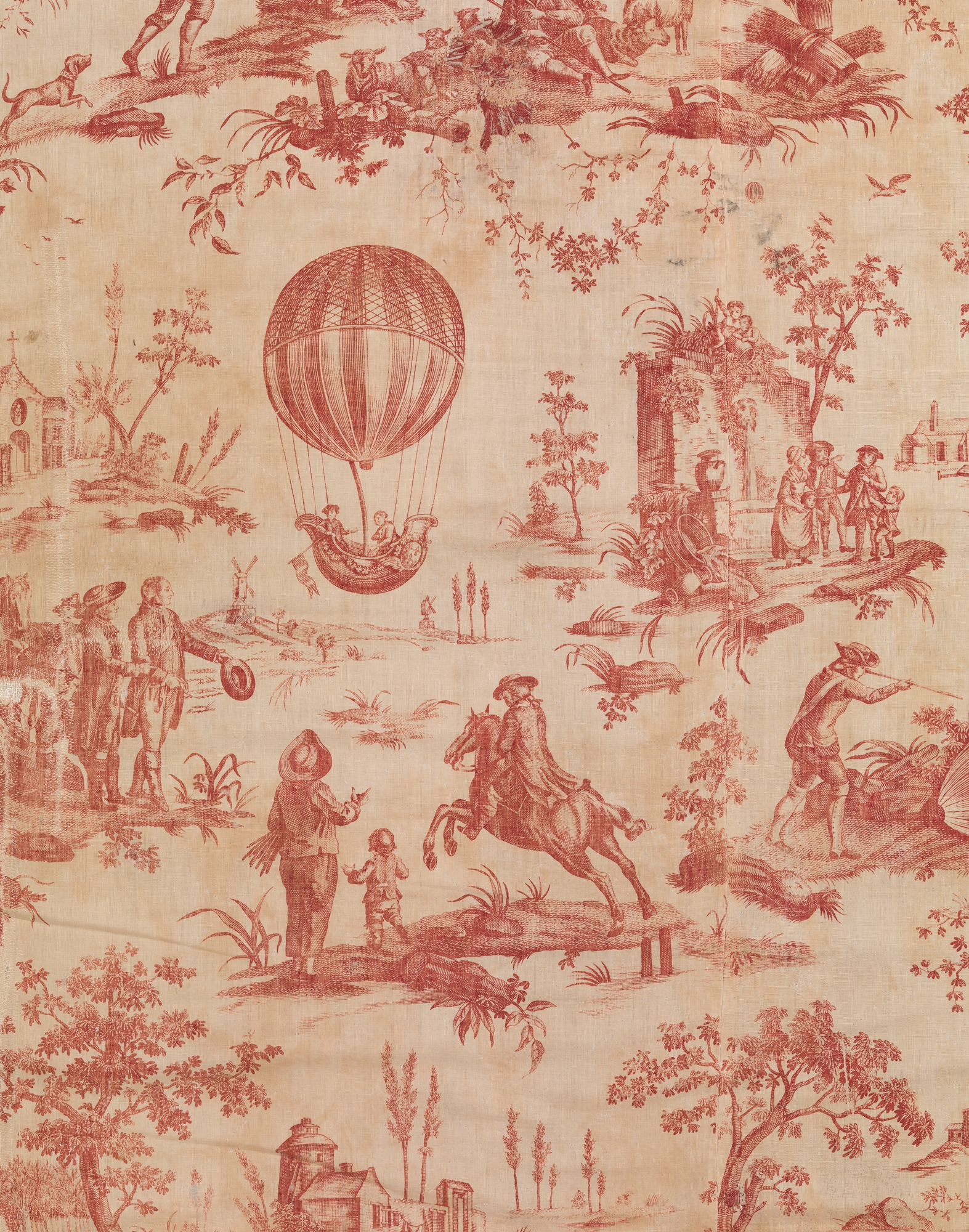
- Left to right, top to bottom: Salon Doré of Marie Antoinette, Chateau de Versailles; Armchair by Georges Jacob, Chateau of Versailles; Château de Bagatelle (1777); Corner cabinet by Jean-Henri Riesener (1785); Toile de Jouy printed fabric, with balloon design (1784)
- Years active: 1774–1789
- Location: France

Louis XVI style, also called Louis Seize, is a style of architecture, furniture, decoration and art which developed in France during the 18-year reign of Louis XVI (1774–1792), just before the French Revolution. It saw the final phase of the Baroque style as well as the birth of French Neoclassicism. The style was a reaction against the elaborate ornament of the preceding Baroque period. It was inspired in part by the discoveries of Ancient Roman paintings, sculpture and architecture in Herculaneum and Pompeii. Its features included the straight column, the simplicity of the post-and-lintel, the architrave of the Greek temple. It also expressed the Rousseau-inspired values of returning to nature and the view of nature as an idealized and wild but still orderly and inherently worthy model for the arts to follow.

Notable architects of the period included Victor Louis (1731–1811), who completed the Grand Théâtre de Bordeaux (1780). The Odeon Theatre in Paris (1779–1782) was built by Marie-Joseph Peyre (1730–1785) and Charles de Wailly (1729–1798). François-Joseph Bélanger completed the Chateau de Bagatelle in just sixty-three days to win a bet for its builder, the King's brother. Another period landmark was the belvedere of the Petit Trianon, built by Richard Mique. The most characteristic building of the late Louis XVI residential style is the Hôtel de Salm in Paris (now the Palais de la Légion d'Honneur), built by Pierre Rousseau in 1751–1783.

Superbly crafted desks and cabinets were created for the Palace of Versailles and other royal residences by cabinetmakers Jean-Henri Riesener and David Roentgen, using inlays of fine woods (particularly mahogany) and decorated with gilded bronze and mother of pearl. Equally fine sets of chairs and tables were made by Jean-Henri Riesener and Georges Jacob.

The royal tapestry works of Gobelins, Aubusson and Beauvais continued to make large tapestries, but an increasing part of their business was the manufacture of upholstery for the new sets of chairs, sofas and other furnishings for the royal residences and nobility. Wallpaper also became an important part of interior design, thanks to new processes developed by Reveillon.

In Hungary, it is known as Copf Style.

== Origins and influences ==
The Louis XVI style was a reaction to and transition the French Baroque style, which had dominated French architecture, decoration and art since the mid-17th century, and partly from a desire to establish a new Beau idéal, or ideal of beauty, based on the purity and grandeur of the art of the Ancient Romans and Greeks. In 1754 The French engraver, painter and art critic Charles-Nicolas Cochin denounced the curves and undulations of the predominant rocaille style: "Don't torture without reason those things which could be straight, and come back to the good sense which is the beginning of good taste."

Louis XVI himself showed little enthusiasm for art or architecture. He left the management of these to Charles-Claude Flahaut de la Billaderie, the Count of Angiviller, who was made Director General of the Bâtiments du Roi. Angeviller, for financial reasons, postponed a grand enlargement of the Palace of Versailles, but completed the new Château de Compiègne (1751–1783), begun by Louis XV, and decorated it from 1782 to 1786. The King's principal architectural addition to Versailles was the new library on the first floor (begun 1774). He was much more generous to Queen Marie Antoinette; she redecorated the Grand Apartments of the Queen at Versailles in 1785, and carried out important works on her apartments at the Palace of Fontainebleau and Compiègne, as well as new apartments in the Tuileries Palace. The King also gave the Queen the Petit Trianon at Versailles, and in 1785 bought a new château for her at St. Cloud.

Classicism, based Roman and Greek models had been used in French architecture since the time of Louis XIV; he rejected a plan by Gian Lorenzo Bernini for a baroque façade of the Louvre Palace, and chose instead a classical façade with a colonnade and pediment. The architects of Louis XIV, Jules Hardouin-Mansart and Jacques Lemercier, turned away from the gothic and renaissance style and used a baroque version of the Roman dome on the new churches at Val-de-Grace and Les Invalides. Louis XV and his chief architects, Jacques Ange Gabriel and Jacques-Germain Soufflot continued the style of architecture based upon symmetry and the straight line. Gabriel created the ensemble of classical buildings around the Place de la Concorde while Soufflot designed the Panthéon (1758–1790) on the Roman model.

An influential building from the late Louis XV period was the Petit Trianon at Versailles (1762–1764), by Jacques Ange Gabriel, built for the mistress of the King, Madame de Pompadour. Its cubic form, symmetric facade and Corinthian peristyle, similar to the villas of Palladio, made it model for the following Louis XVI style.

Another notable influence on the style was the architecture of the Renaissance architect Andrea Palladio, which influenced the building of country houses in England, as well as the French architect Claude-Nicolas Ledoux (1736–1806). Palladio's ideas were the inspiration for the Château de Louveciennes, and its neoclassical music pavilion (1770–1771) built by Claude Nicolas Ledoux for the mistress of Louis XV, Madame du Barry. The pavilion is cubic in form, with a facade of four pilasters supporting the architrave and the pilaster of the terrace. It became the model for similar houses under Louis XVI.

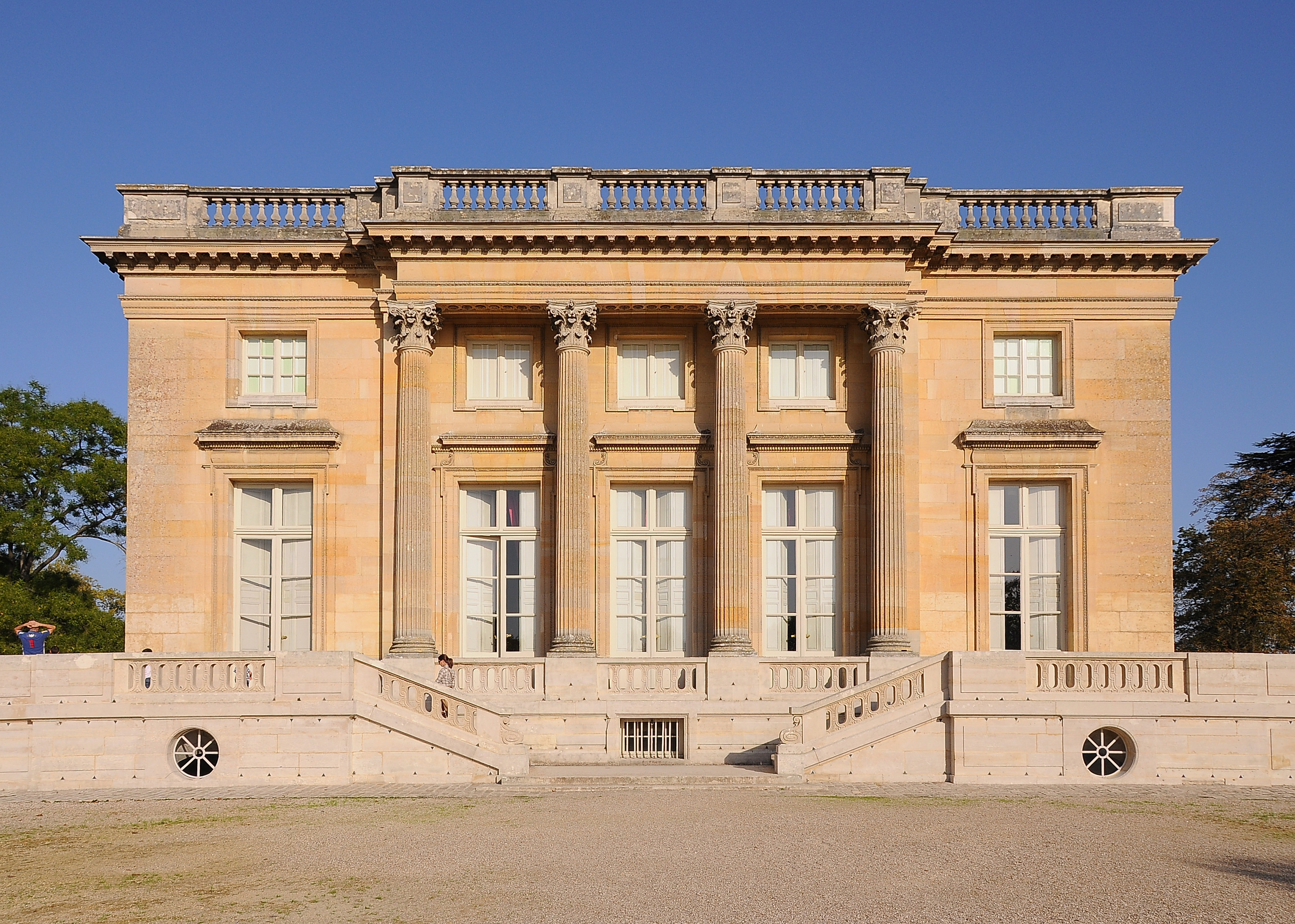
The Petit Trianon at Versailles (1762–1764) by Jacques Ange Gabriel

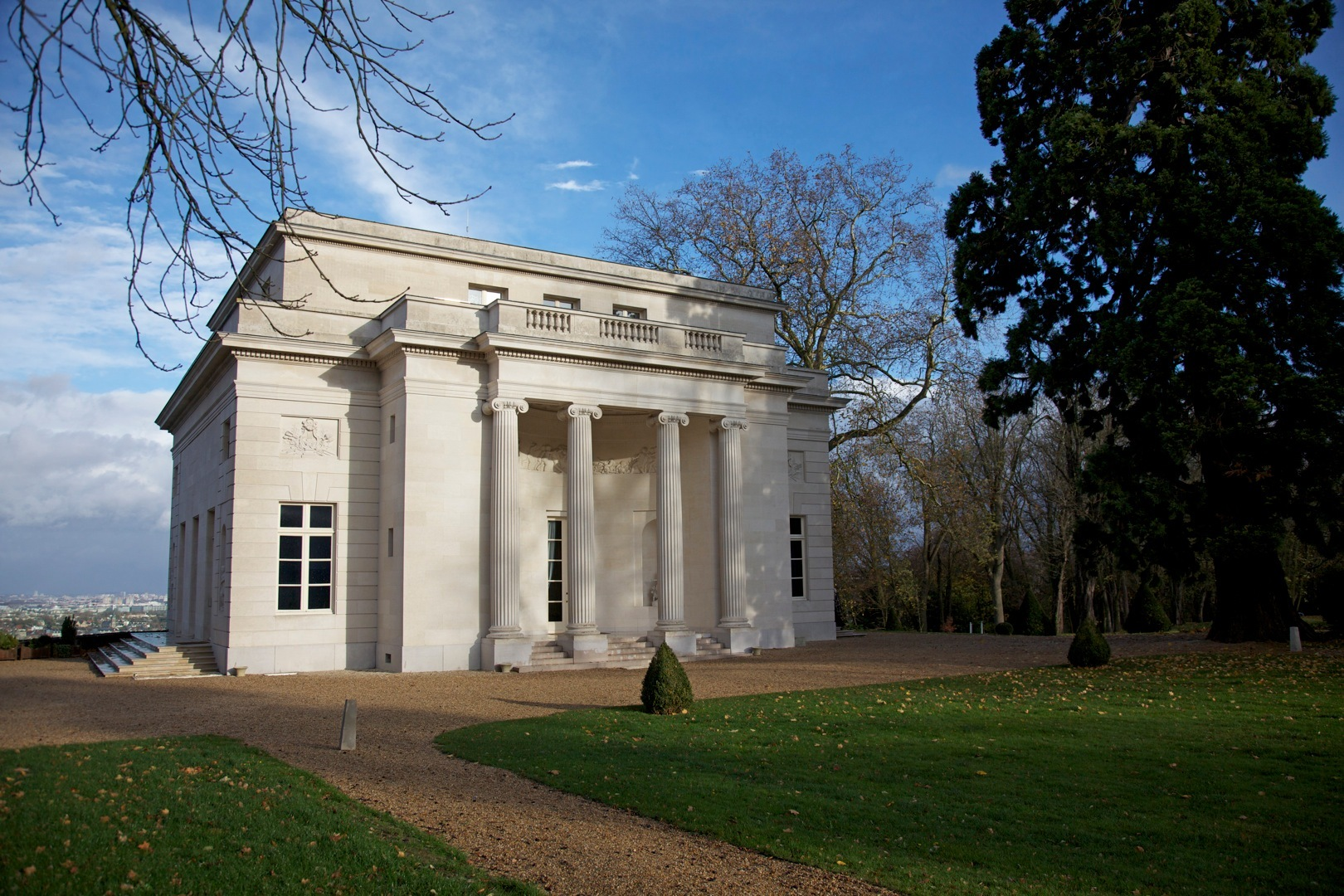
Music pavilion at the Château de Louveciennes (1770–1771) by Claude Nicolas Ledoux

== Motifs and ornaments ==
The decorative motifs of Louis XVI style were inspired by antiquity, the Louis XIV style, and nature. Characteristic elements of the style: a torch crossed with a sheath with arrows, imbricated disks, guilloché, double bow-knots, smoking braziers, linear repetitions of small motifs (rosettes, beads, oves), trophy or floral medallions hanging from a knotted ribbon, acanthus leaves, gadrooning, interlace, meanders, cornucopias, mascarons, Ancient urns, tripods, perfume burners, dolphins, ram and lion heads, chimeras, and gryphons. Greco-Roman architectural motifs are also very used: flutings, pilasters (fluted and unfluted), fluted balusters (twisted and straight), columns (engaged and unengaged, sometimes replaced by caryatids), volute corbels, triglyphs with guttae (in relief and trompe-l'œil).

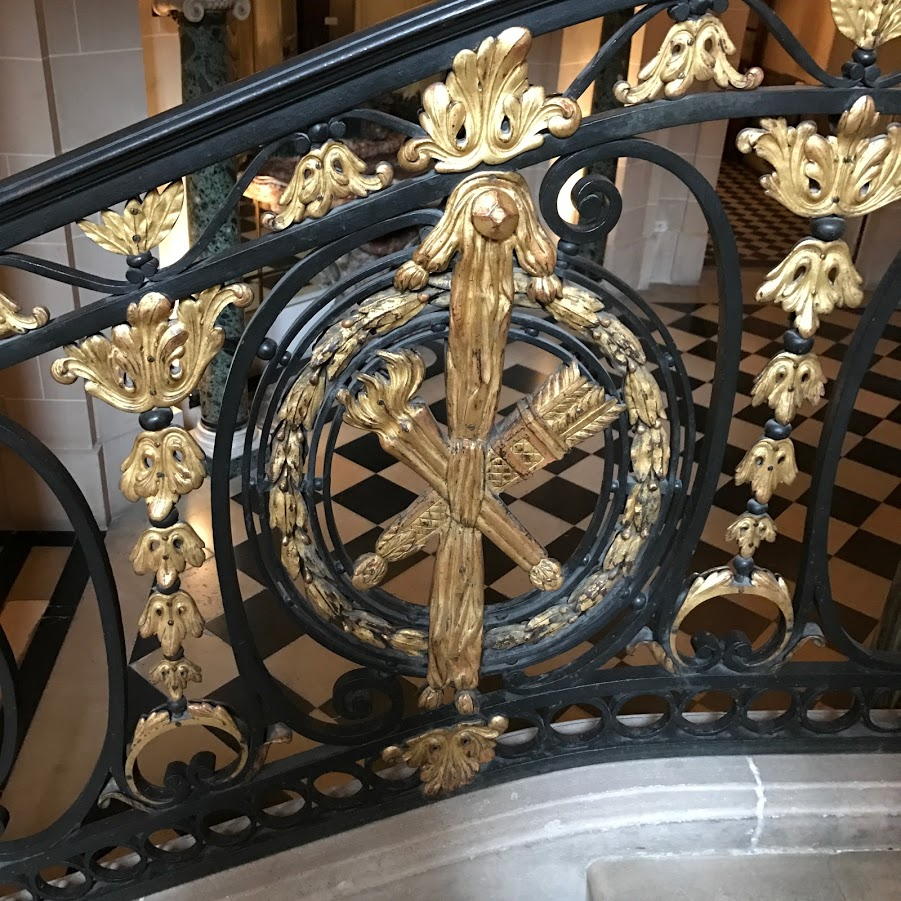
A torch crossed with a sheath with arrows on a railing from the Musée Nissim de Camondo (Paris)

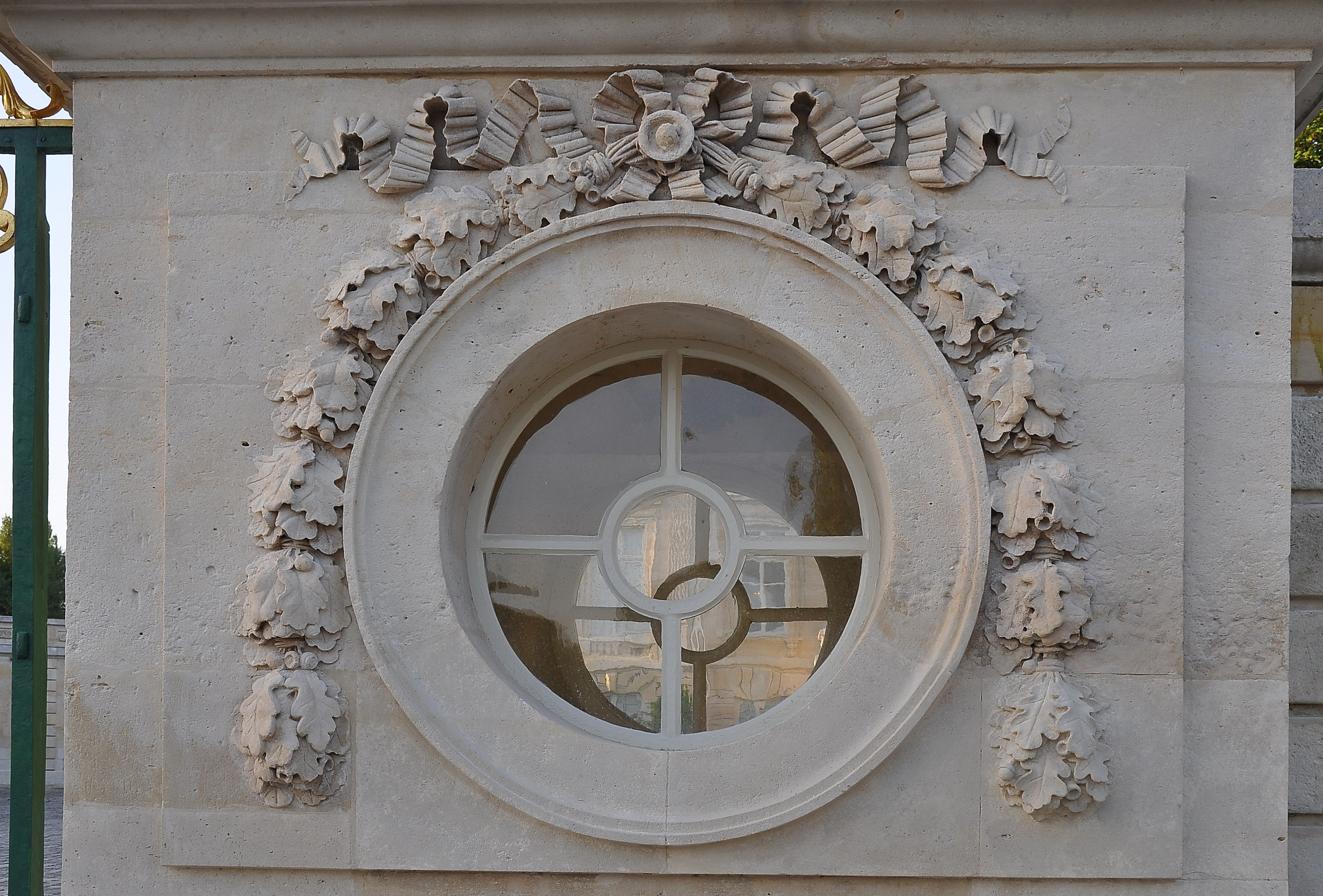
Oculus of the Petit Trianon (Versailles, France), with a ribbon at the top and two festoon-derived hanging ornaments

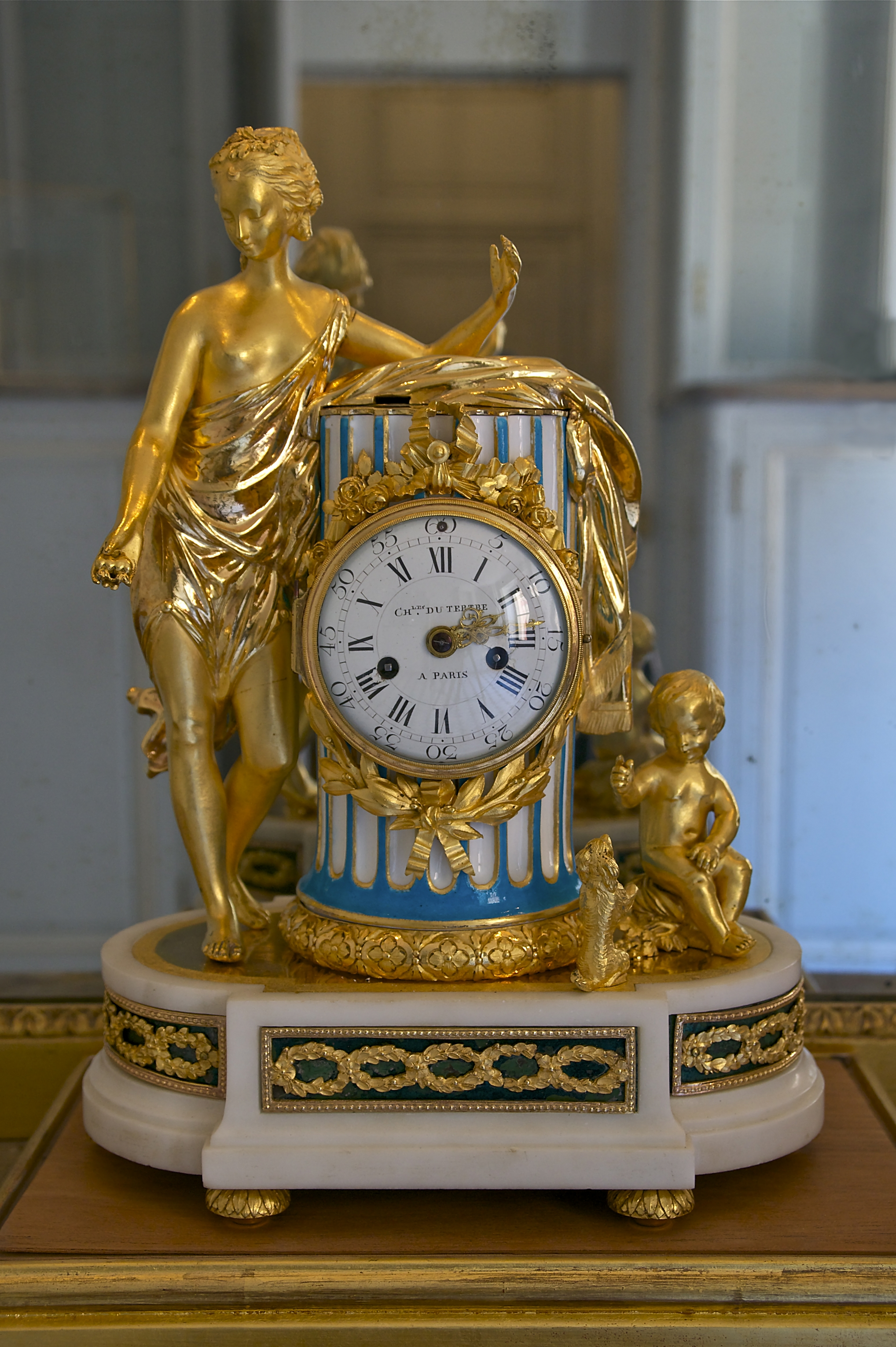
Pendulum clock with ormolu mounts and a porcelain column part

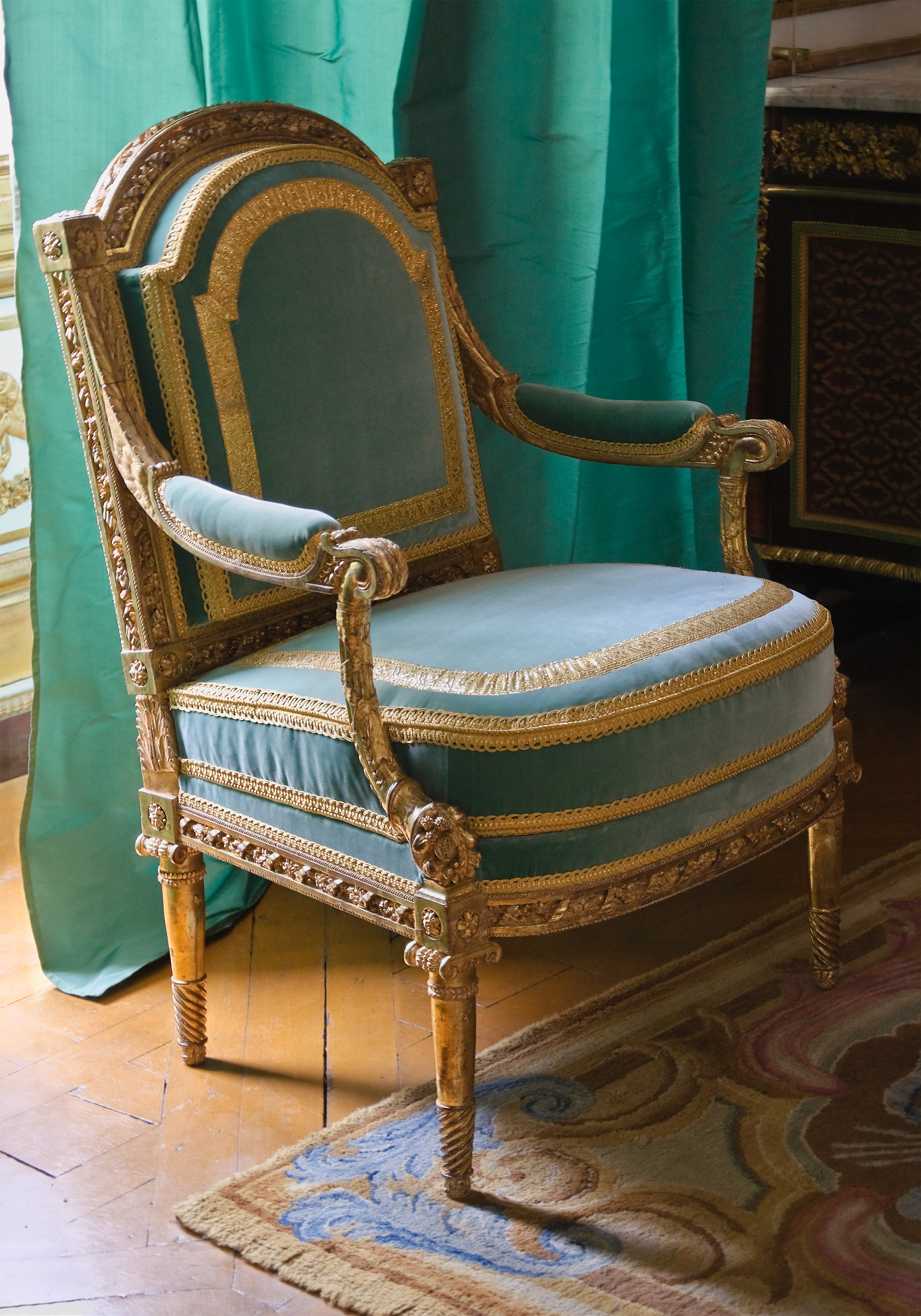
Armchair with a pair of cornucopias at the arms

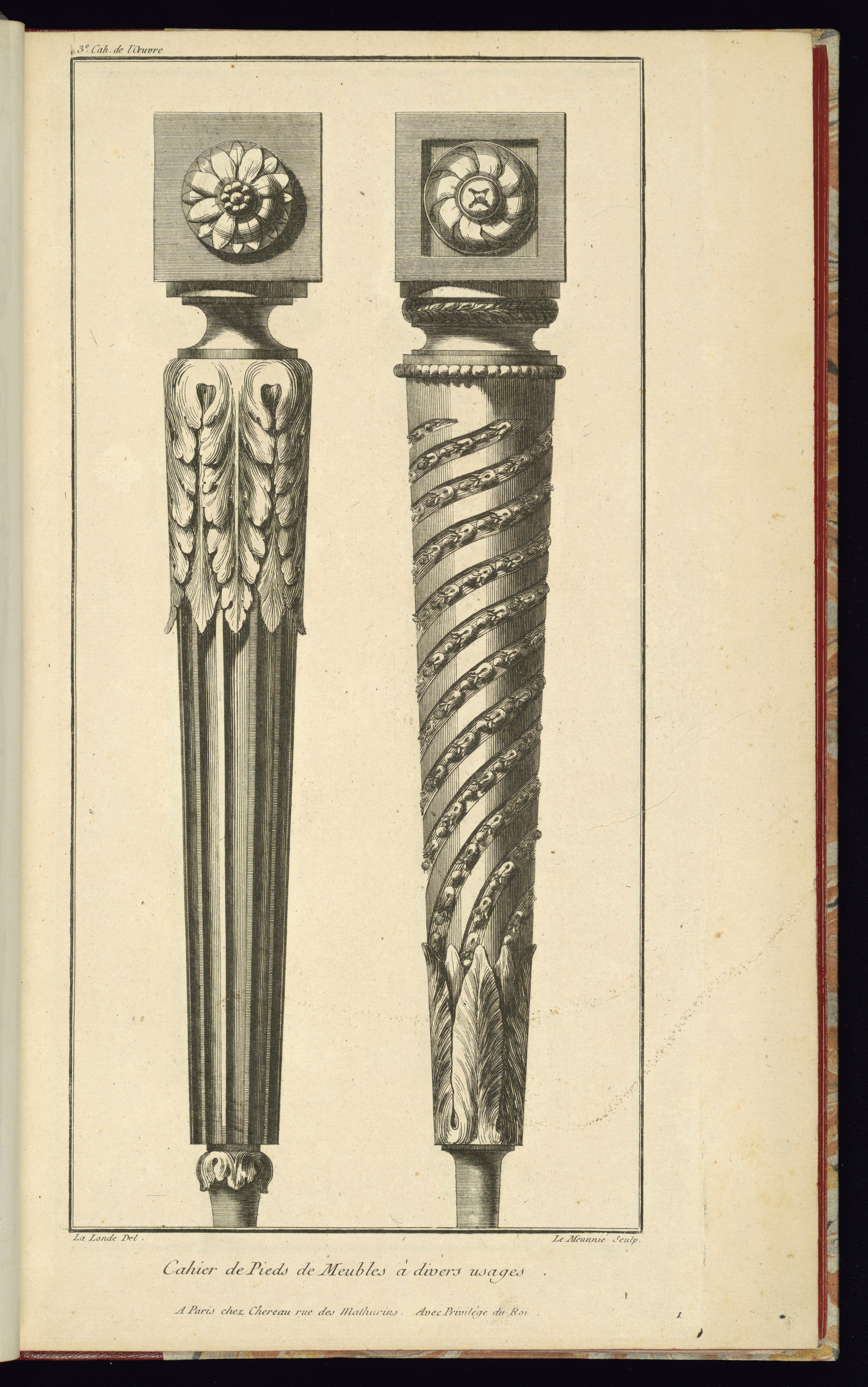
Two designs of legs, one featuring straight flutings and acanthus leafs, and the other twisted flutings

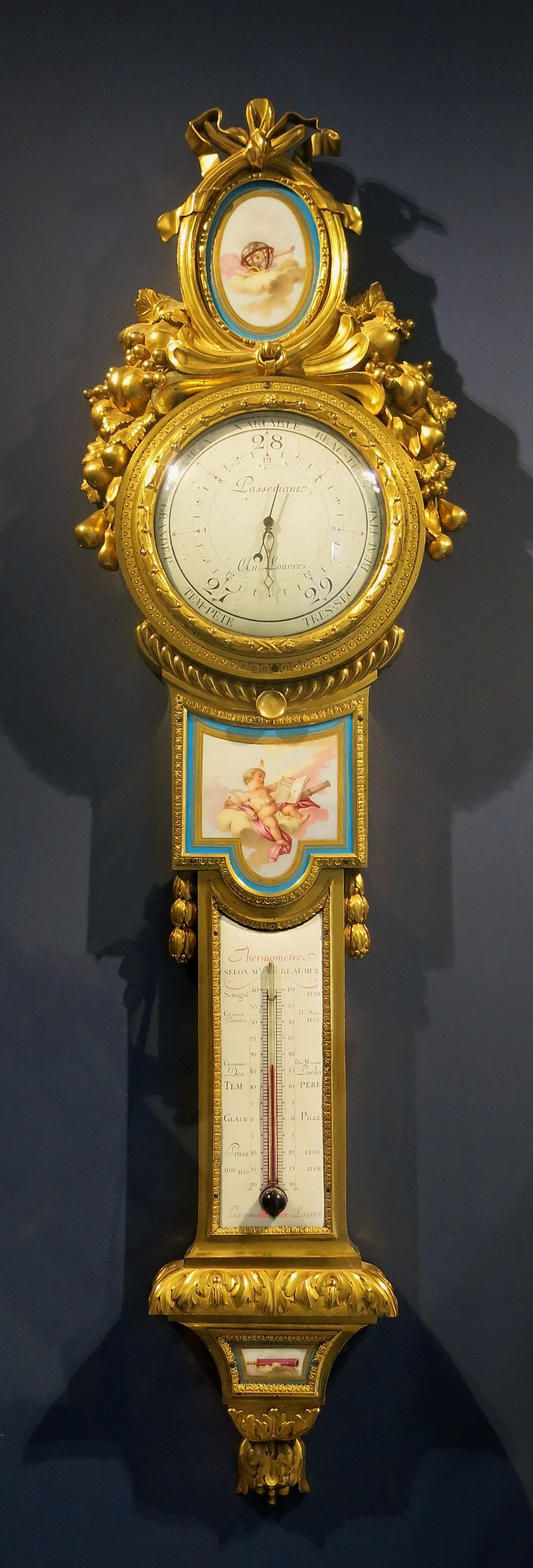
Barometer - thermometer made of geometric shapes

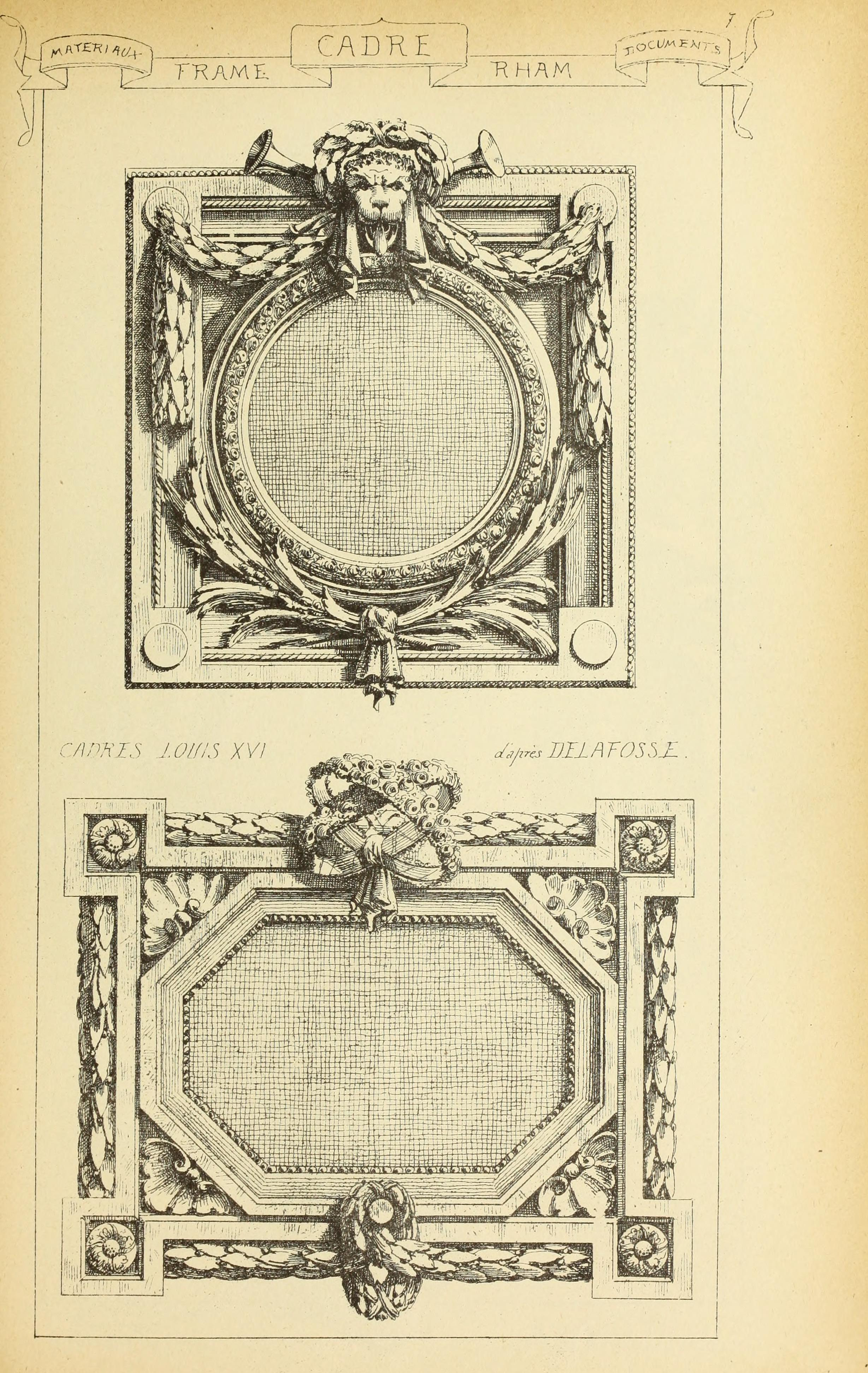
Complex designs of cartouches

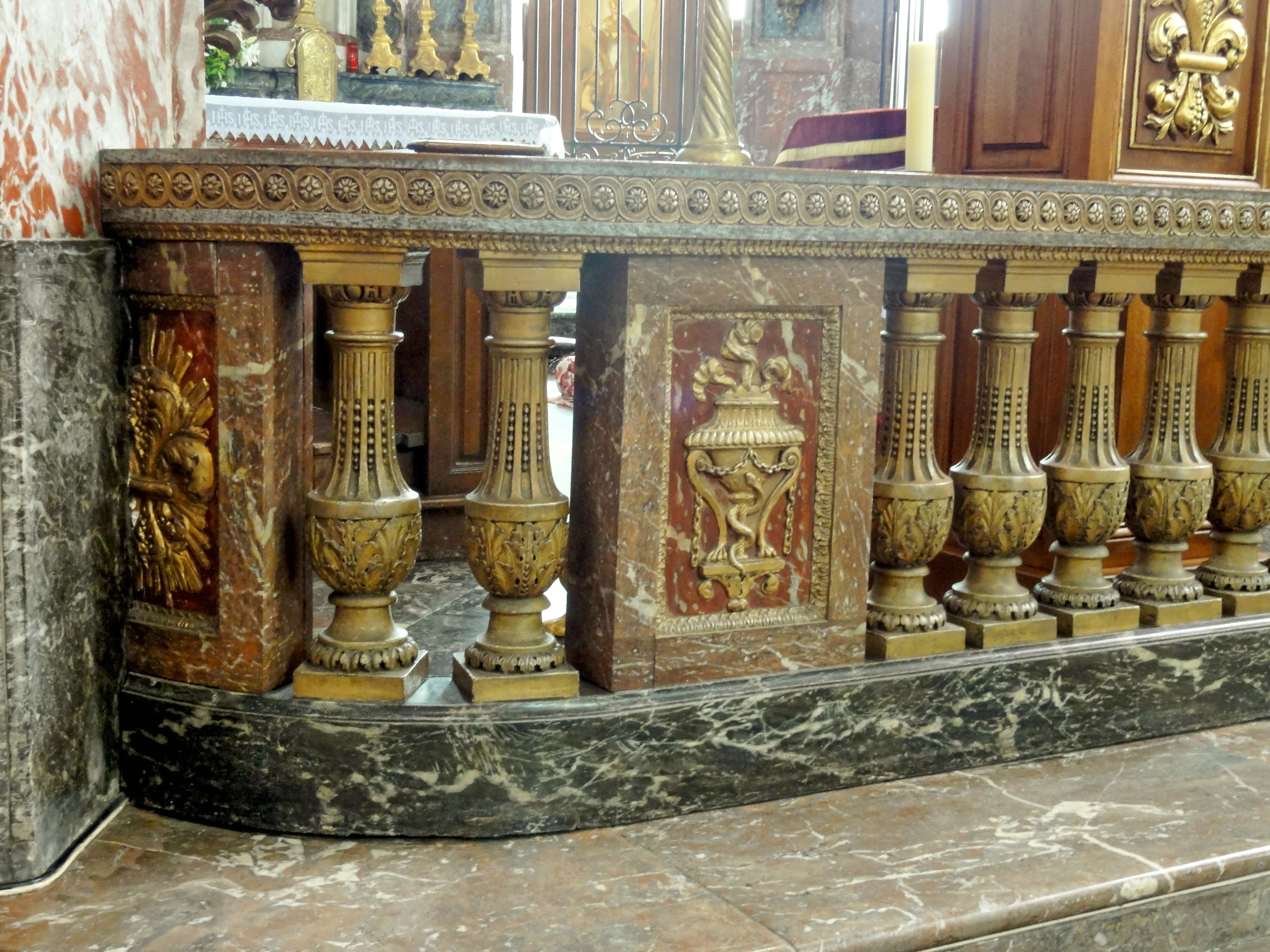
Railing with an interlace band at the top, flutings and acanthuses on the balusters, and a relief of an urn

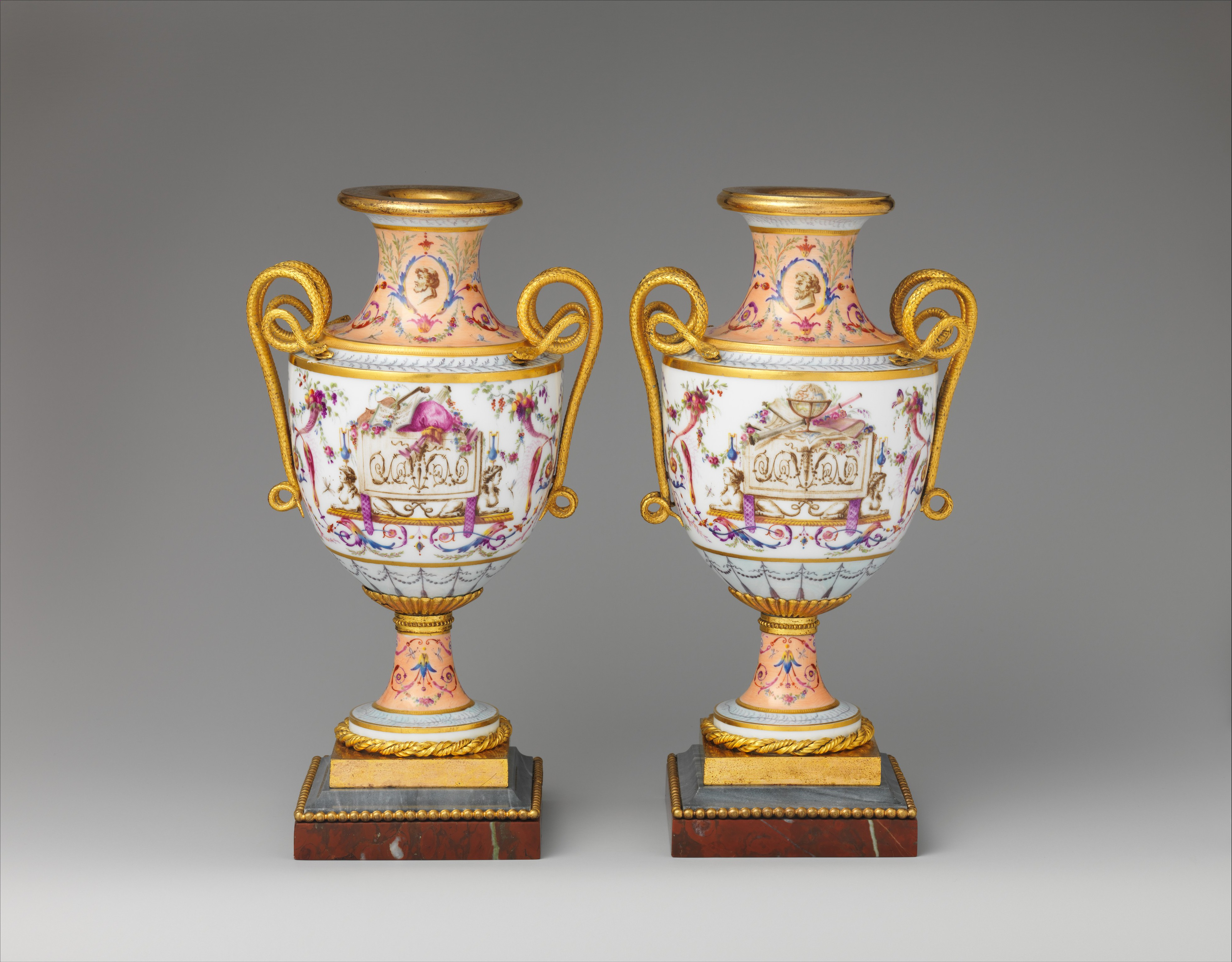
Pair of amphora-shaped vases decorated with festoons, rinceaux, trophies (one made of musical instruments and the other made of scientific ones), and sphinxes

== Civil architecture ==
Notable monuments of Louis XVI civil architecture include the Hotel de la Monnaie in Paris (1771–1776) by Jacques Denis Antoine, as well as the Palais de Justice, Paris by the same architect; and the theater of Besançon (1775) and the Château de Bénouville in the Calvados, both by Ledoux. The latter building has geometric architecture, a flat ceiling, and a portico in the giant order of Corinthian columns. The École de Chirurgie, or School of Surgery in Paris by Jacques Gondoin (1769) adapted the forms of the neoclassical town house, with a court of honor placed between a pavilion with a colonnade on the street and the main building. He also added a peristyle and another floor above the columns, and transformed he entrance to the courtyard into a miniature triumphal arch.

Theatres in Paris and Bordeaux were prominent examples of the new style. The architect Victor Louis (1731–1811) completed the Grand Théâtre de Bordeaux (1780); its majestic stairway was a forerunner of the stairway of the Paris Opera Garnier. In 1791, in the midst of the French Revolution, he completed the Salle Richelieu, now the home of the Comédie-Française. The Odeon Theatre in Paris (1779–1782) was built by Marie-Joseph Peyre (1730–1785) and Charles de Wailly (1729–1798). It featured a portico in the form of a covered gallery and columns in advance of the facade.

One of the best-known buildings of the period is the small Château de Bagatelle (1777), designed and built by François-Joseph Bélanger for the Comte d'Artois, Louis XVI's brother. The small château was designed and completed in just sixty three days, to win a bet with Marie Antoinette that he could build a château in less than three months. Marie Antoinette had a similar small neoclassical belvedere created by architect Richard Mique, who had also designed the Hameau de la Reine, her picturesque rustic village in the gardens.

Another unusual architectural project was the transformation of the Palais Royal in the heart of Paris, into a grand shopping mall. In 1781 the Duc de Chartres, needing money, commissioned architect Victor Louis to create an arcade of shops, cafes and clubs on the ground floor. In 1788 he added a covered cirque in the center, a covered promenade and space for concerts and entertainments, with a trellis roof supported by seventy-two ionic columns.

The most characteristic building of the late Louis XVI residential style is the Hôtel de Salm in Paris (Now the Palais de la Légion d'Honneur, built by Pierre Rousseau in 1751–1783. The façade is distinguished by its simplicity and purity, and its harmony and balance. A colonnade of corinthian columns supports the entablature of the rotunda, which is surmounted by statues. The façade is also animated by busts of Roman emperors in niches, and sculptures in relief above the windows of the semicircular central avant-corps.

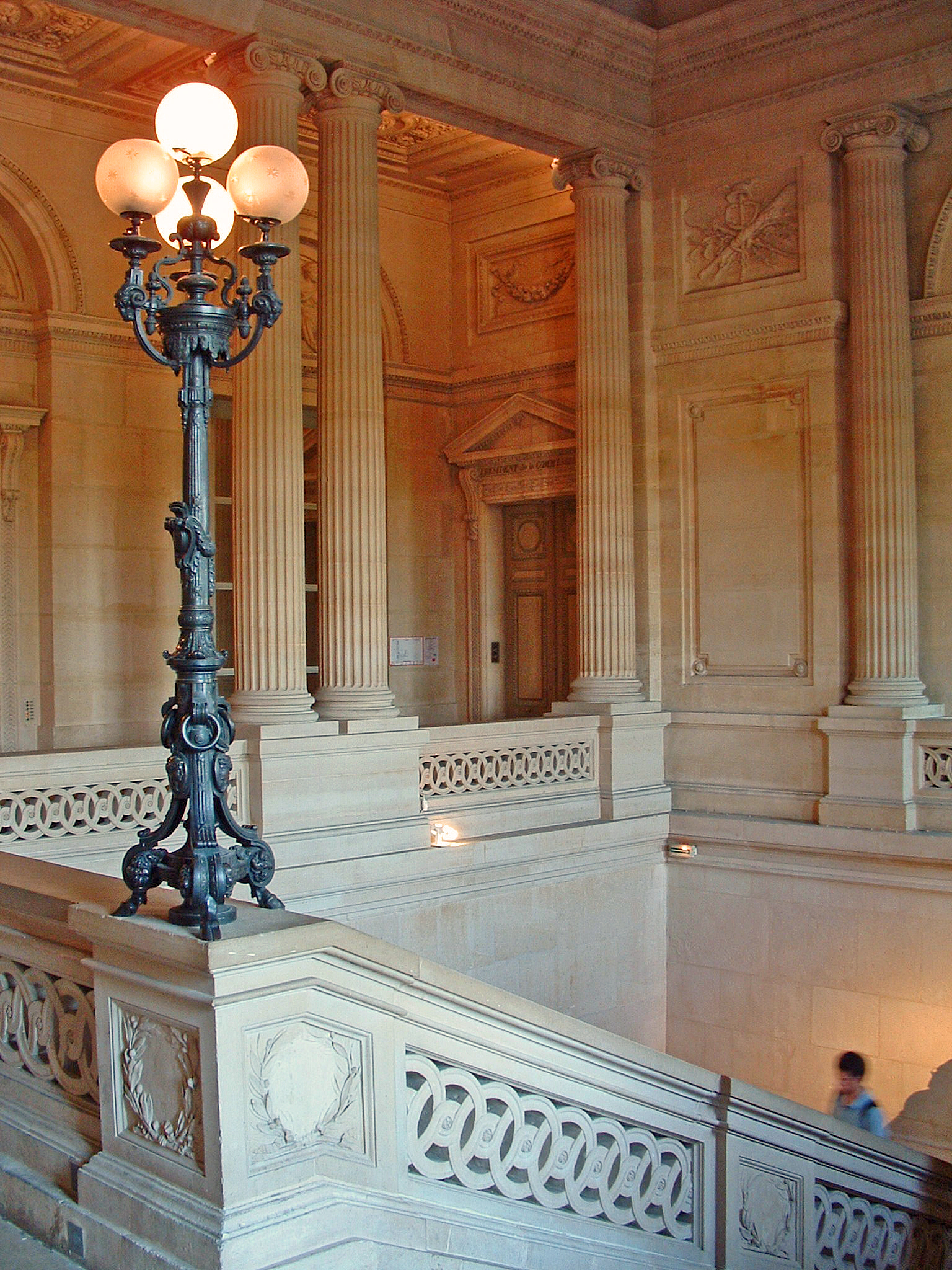
Stairs in the Hôtel des Monnaies by Jacques Denis Antoine (18th century)

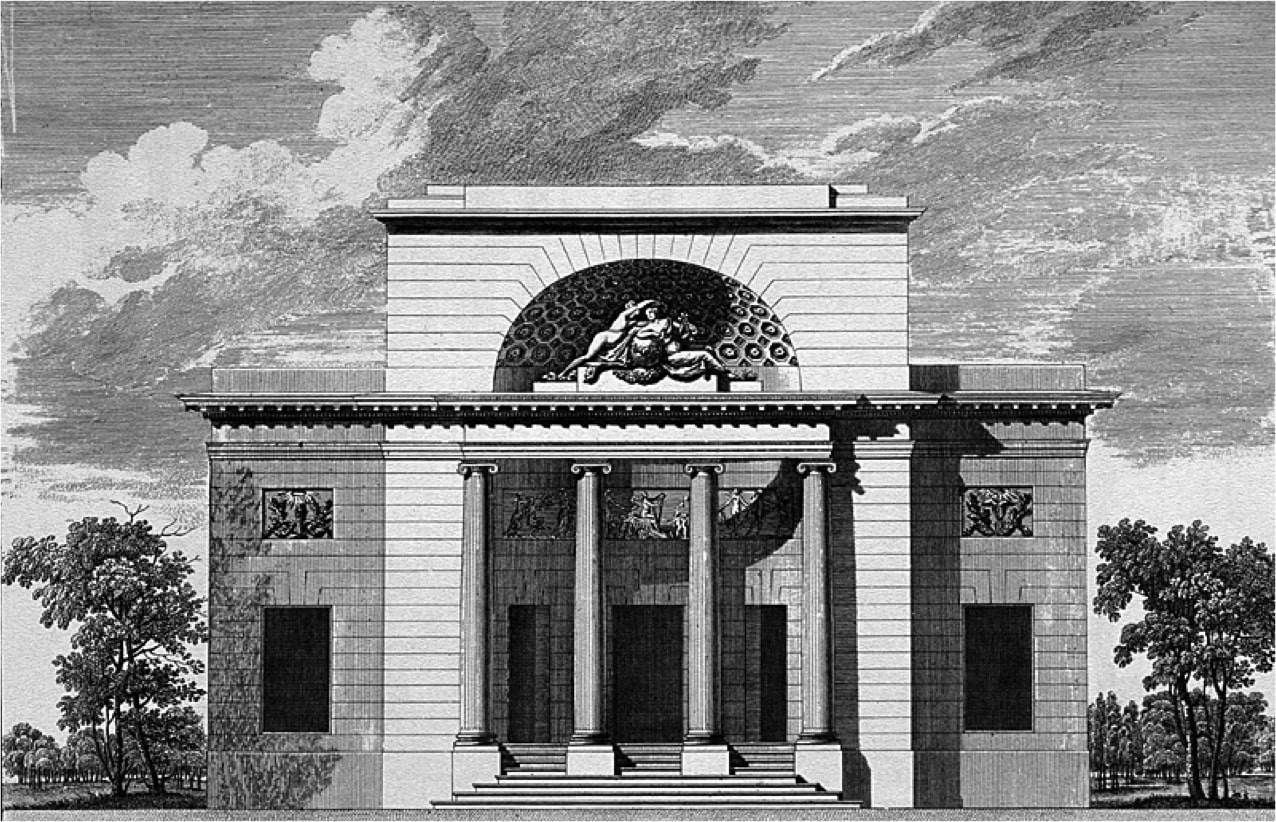
Hôtel Guimard by Claude-Nicolas Ledoux (1770–1773)

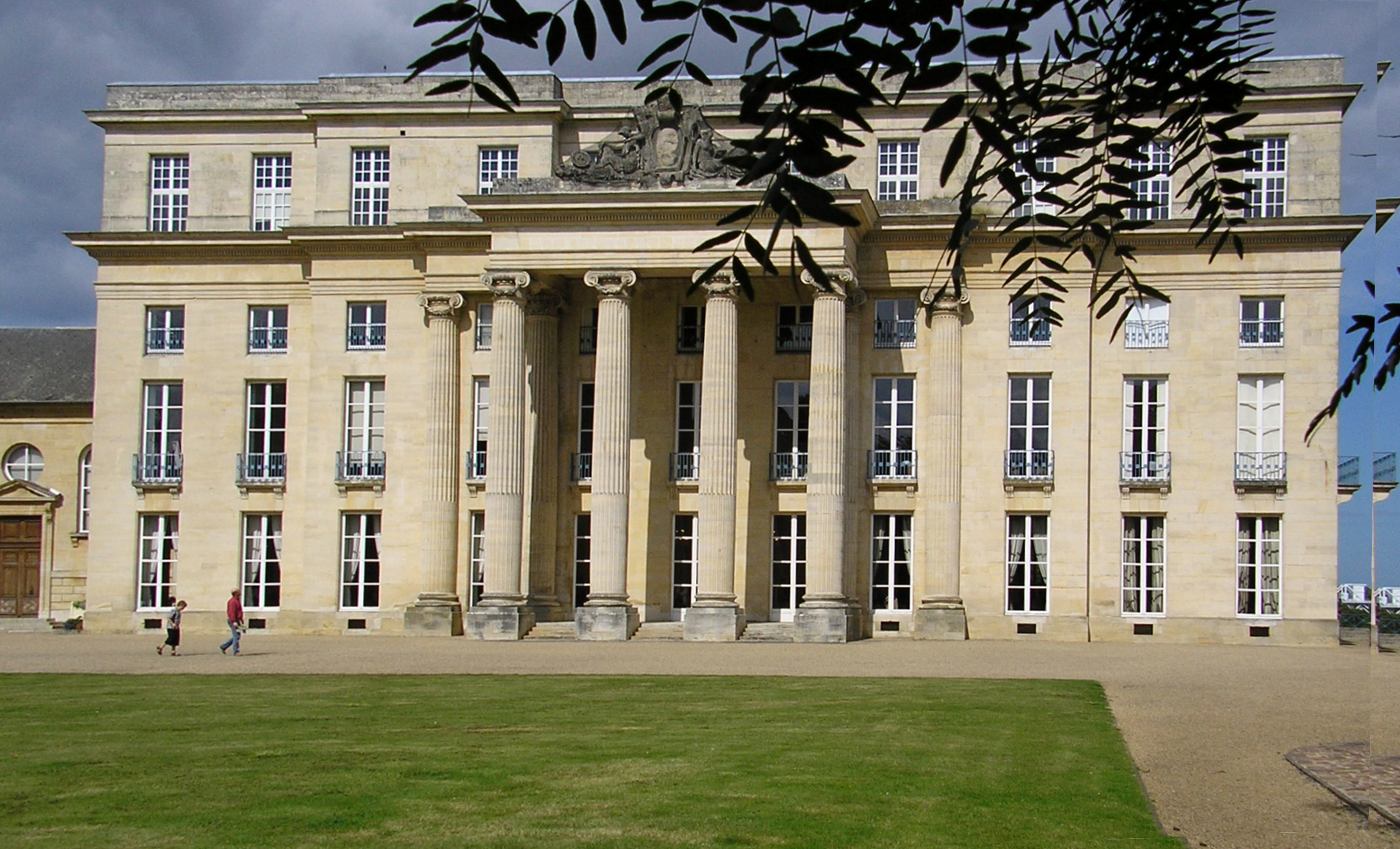
Château de Bénouville by Claude-Nicolas Ledoux (1770–1780)

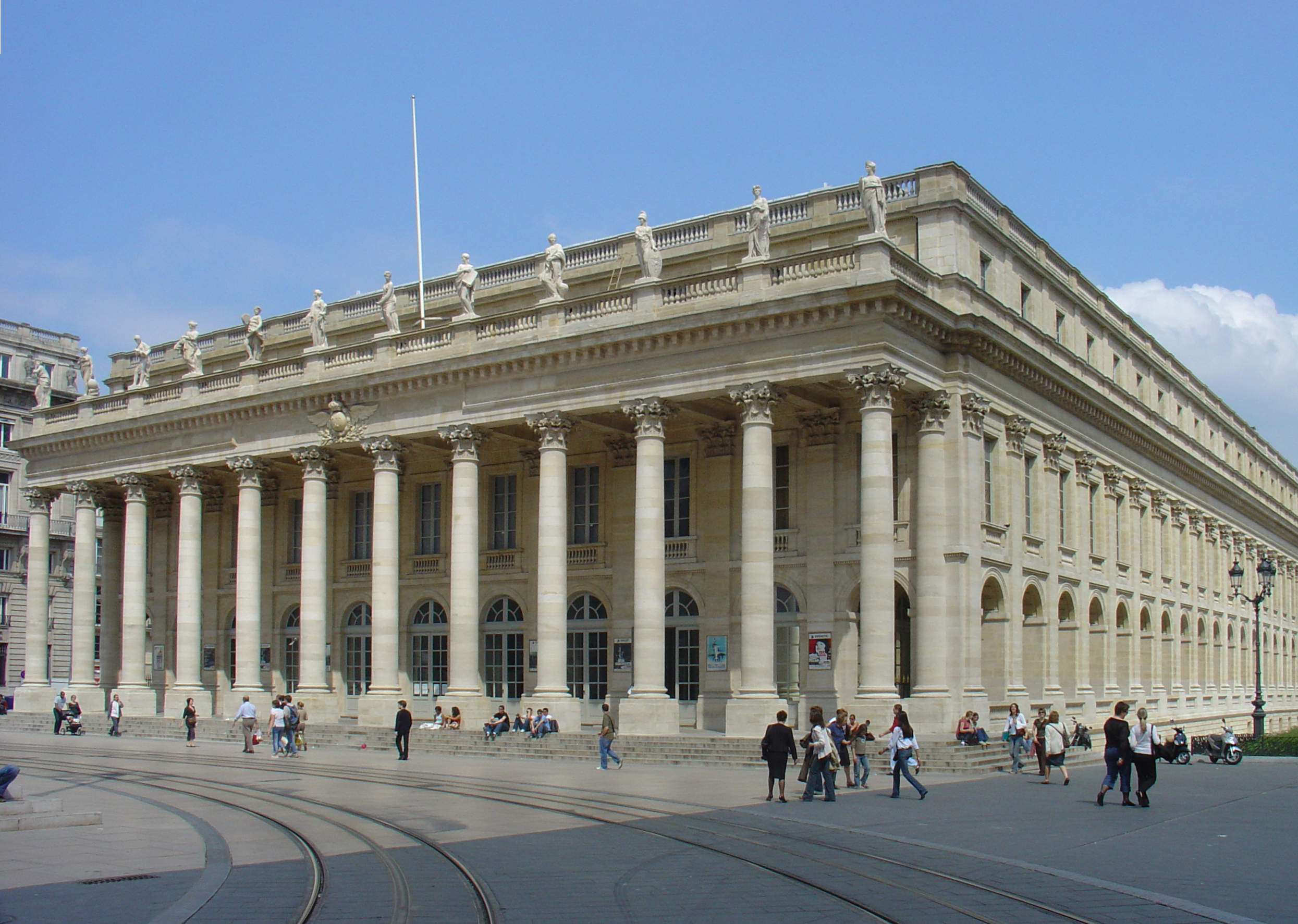
Grand Théâtre de Bordeaux by Victor Louis (1780)

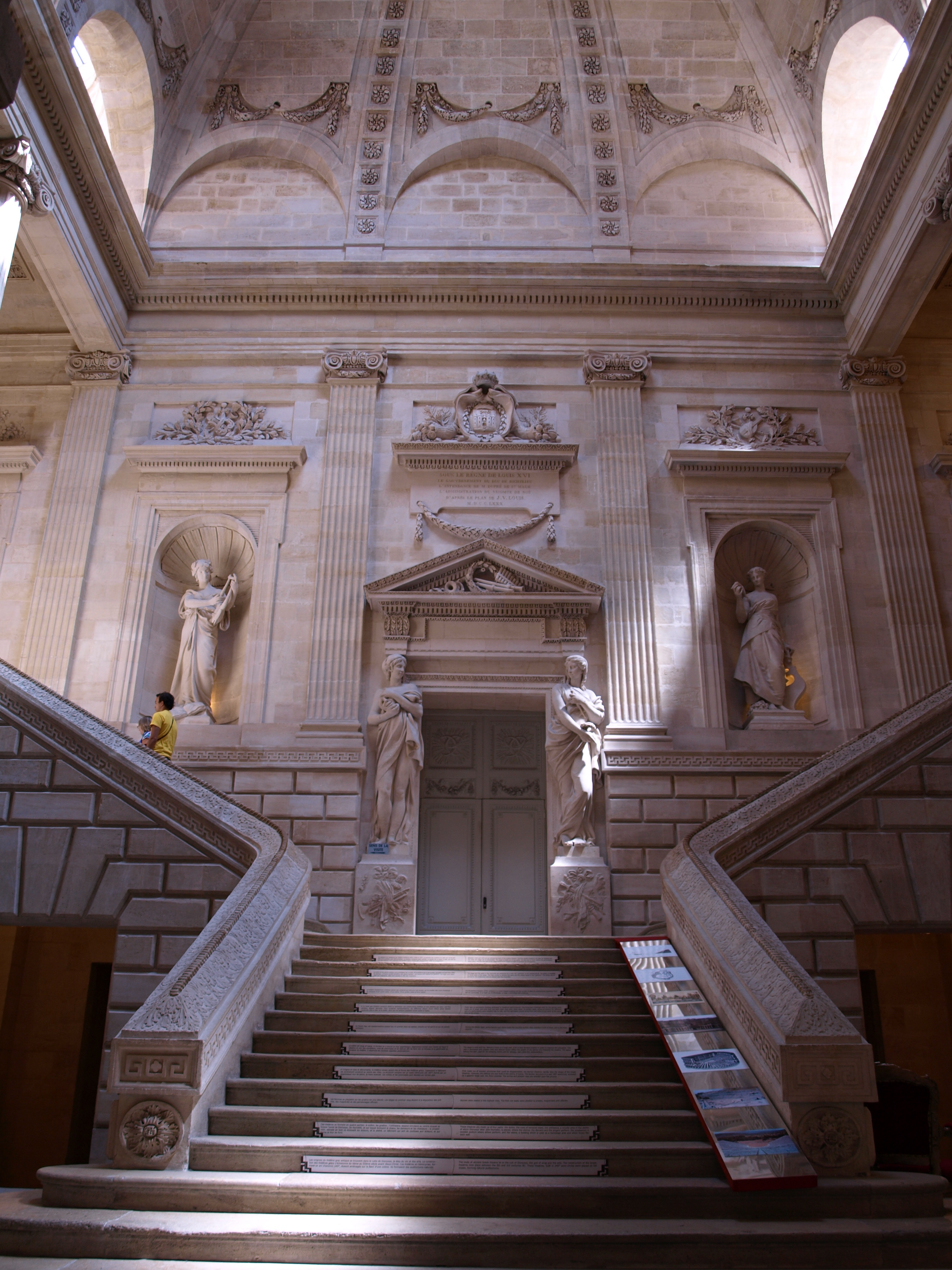
Stairway of the Grand Théâtre de Bordeaux, Victor Louis (1780)

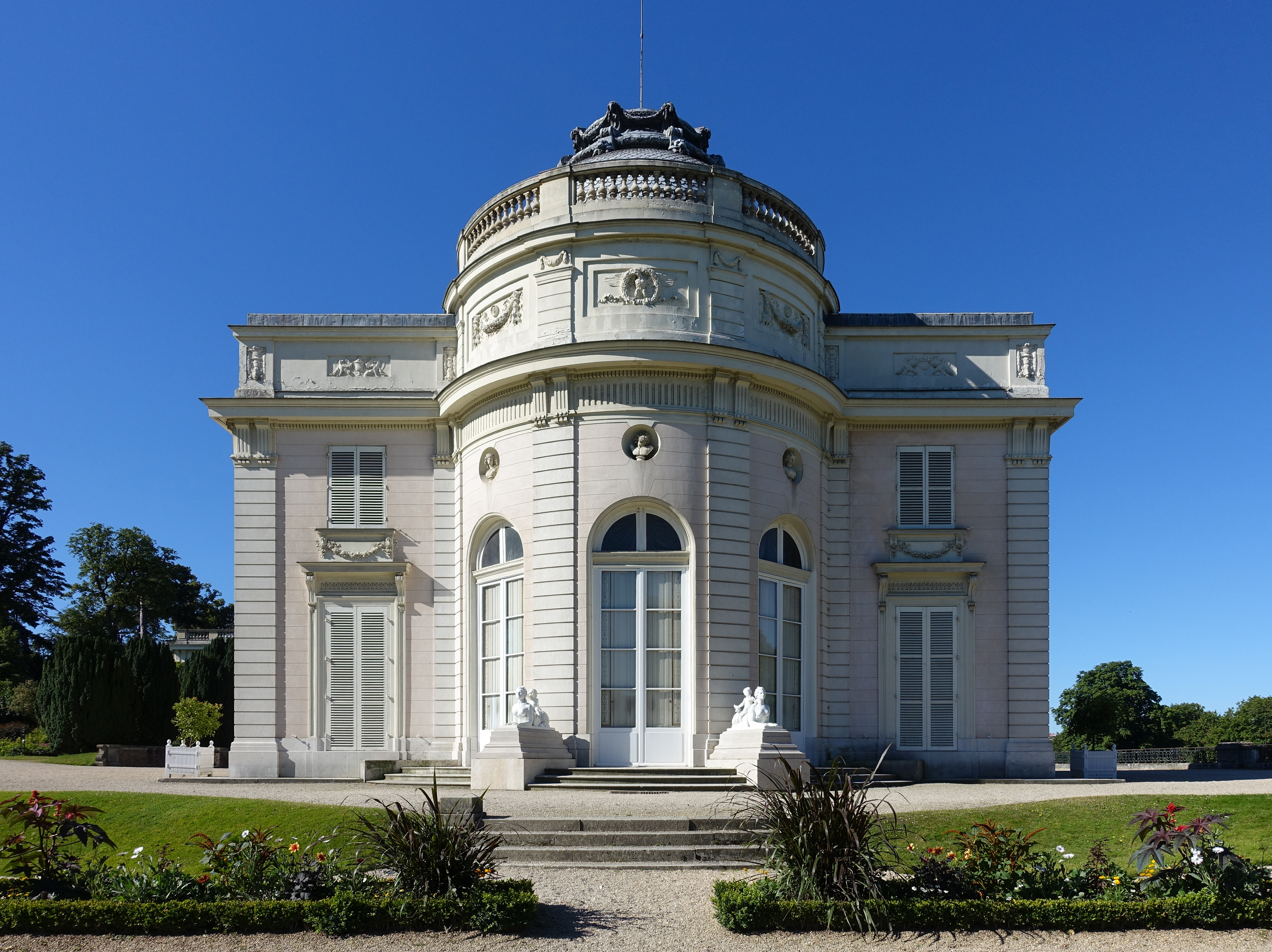
Château de Bagatelle by François-Joseph Bélanger (1777)

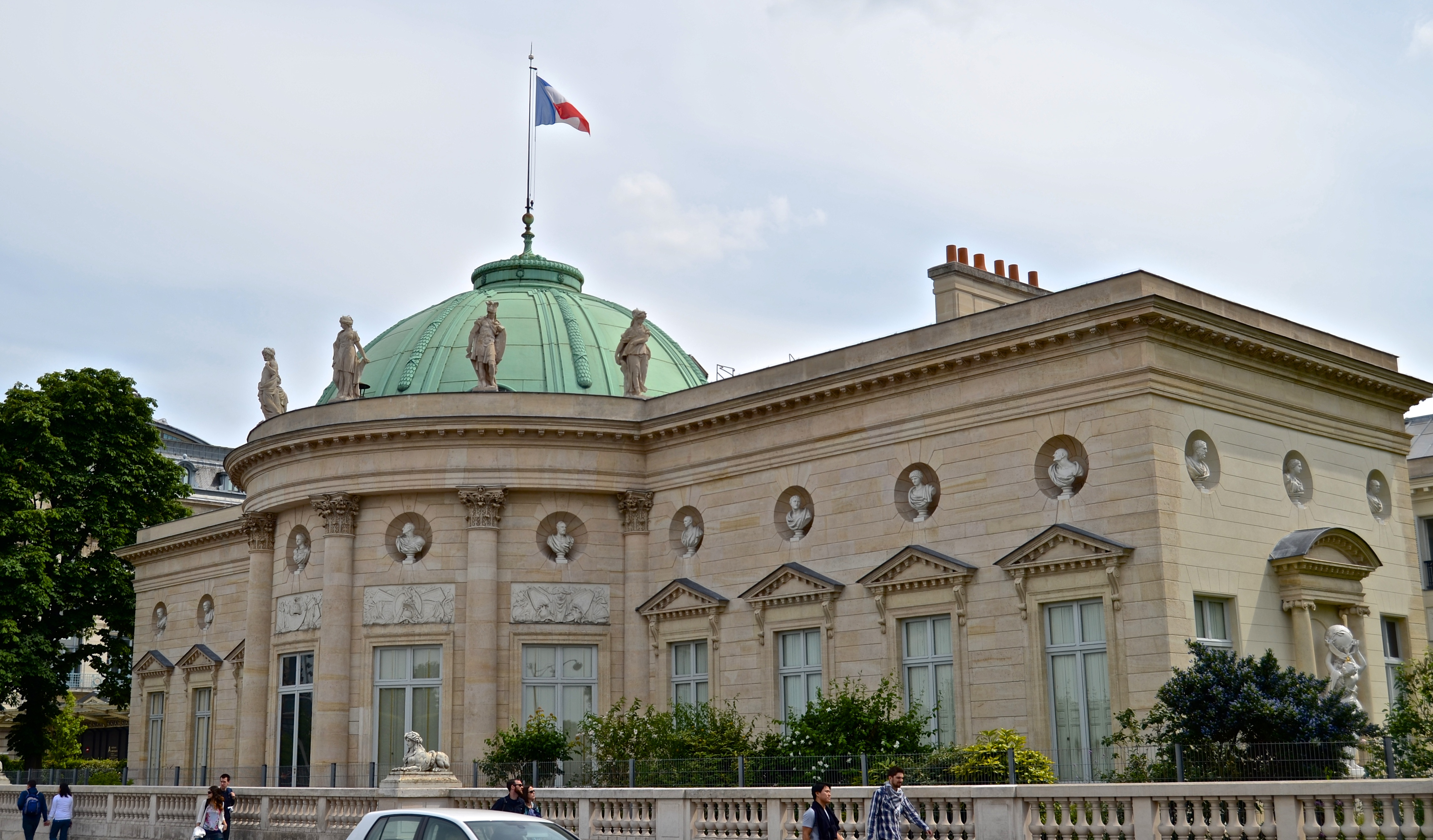
The Hotel de Salm, Paris, by Pierre Rousseau (1751–1810)

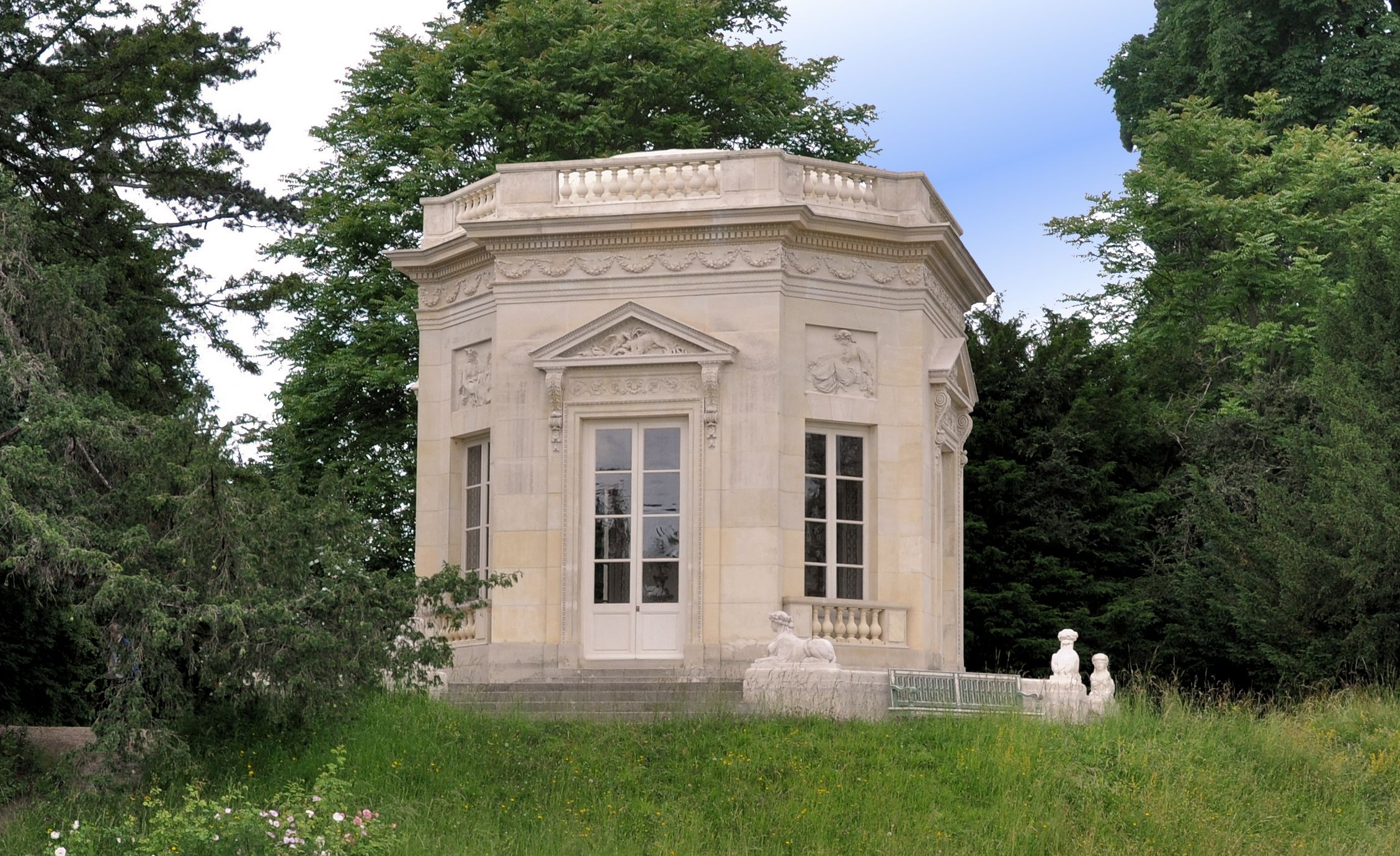
The Belvedere of the Petit Trianon at Versailles by Richard Mique (1789)

== Religious architecture ==
The Panthéon, designed by Jacques Germain Soufflot as the Church of Sainte-Geneviève and begun in 1757 under Louis XV, was the most prominent example of religious architecture under construction during the period. It replaced the colossal columns modeled after those of the Church of the Gesù and St. Peter's Basilica in Rome with slender, graceful corinthian columns supporting a continuous entablature. The plan was also classical; the long nave with a vaulted ceiling was replaced by a Greek cross, with the dome in the center. Soufflot employed novel engineering techniques to support the dome; a system of contreforts and arches, and the use of iron bars to support the stone structure. The building was begun in 1764 but not completed until 1790, after the Revolution.

Another important church completed in the Louis XVI period was Église Saint-Philippe-du-Roule (1768–1784) by Jean-François Chalgrin. It was one of the last churches finished before the Revolution. The church is inspired by paleo-Christian architecture; it features massive columns and a pediment, and an interior with vaulted ceiling that suggests a vast Roman basilica.

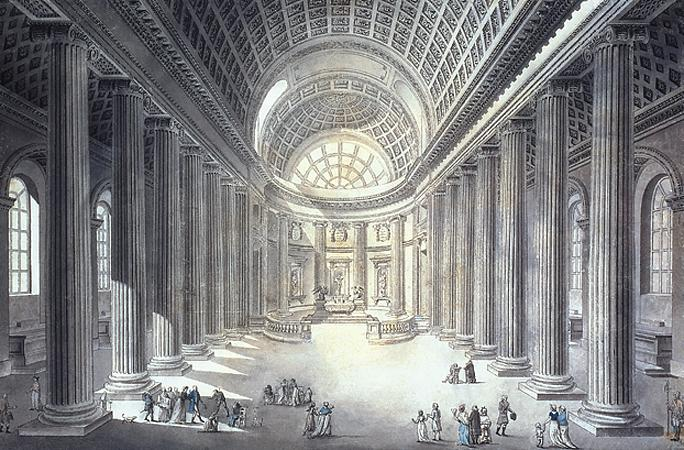
Interior of Eglise Saint-Philippe-du-Roule (1764–1784) by Jean-François Chalgrin

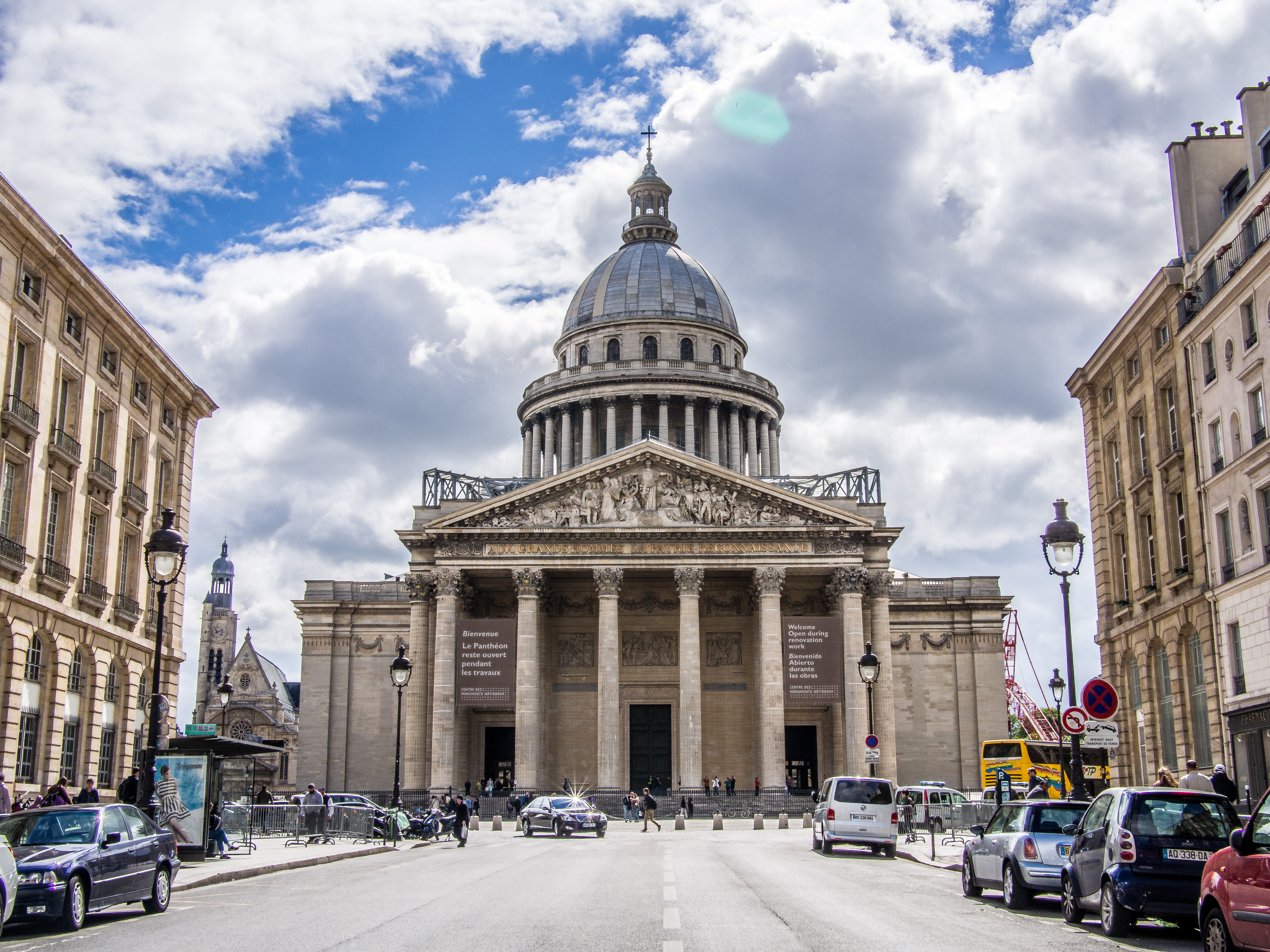
The Panthéon (1764–1790), by Jacques-Germain Soufflot

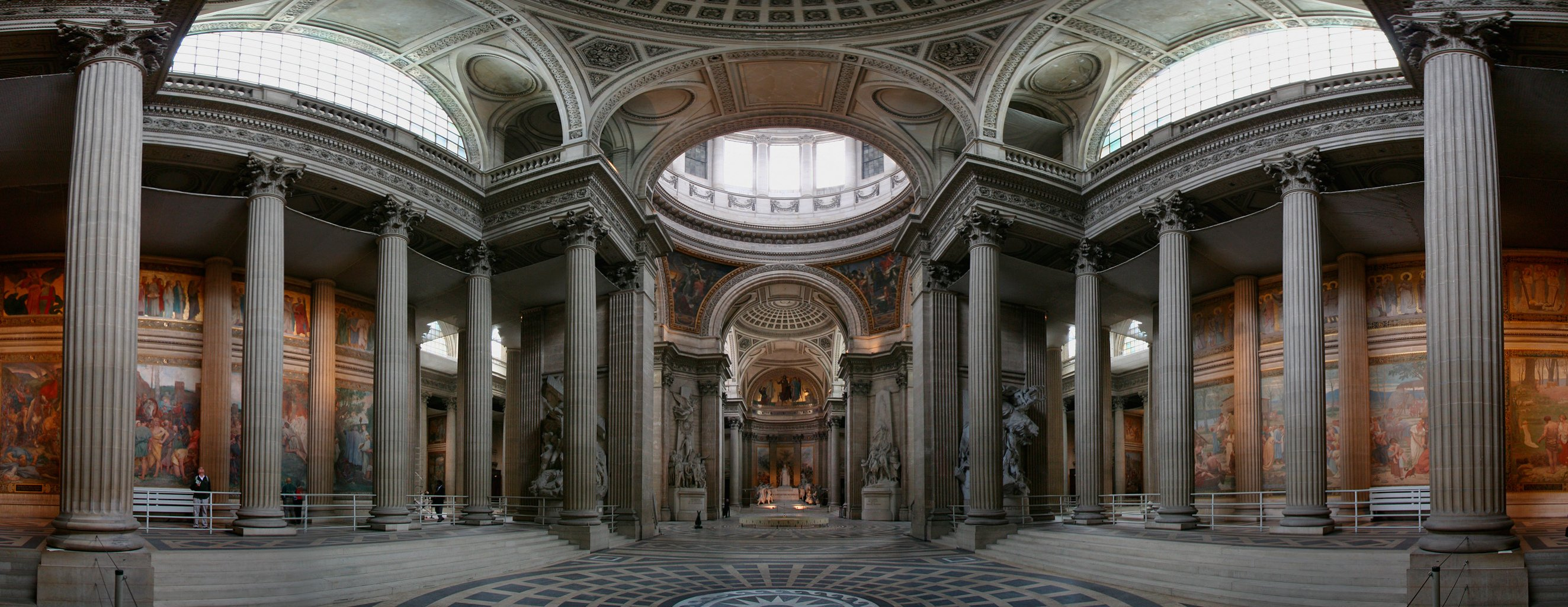
Interior of the Panthéon

== Functional and utopian architecture ==
The architect Claude-Nicolas Ledoux specialized in designing functional buildings in greatly simplified the classical style. Examples included his simplified neoclassical design for the customs barrier at La Villette in Paris (1785–1789), with its classical facade and rotunda. He was especially known for his project for the Royal Saltworks at Arc-et-Senans (1775–1779) This was a model industrial site, in an elliptical shape, with the house of the factory director in the centre, with a rustic neoclassical colonnade, surrounded by the workshops, storerooms and offices in concentric rings.

Etienne-Louis Boullée (1728–1799) was another visionary architect of the period; his projects, never built, included a monument to Isaac Newton (1784) in the form of an immense dome, with an oculus allowing the light to enter, giving the impression of a sky full of stars. His project for an enlargement of the Royal Library (1785) was even more dramatic, with a gigantic arch sheltering the collection of books. While none of his projects were ever built, the images were widely published and inspired architects of the period to look outside the traditional forms.

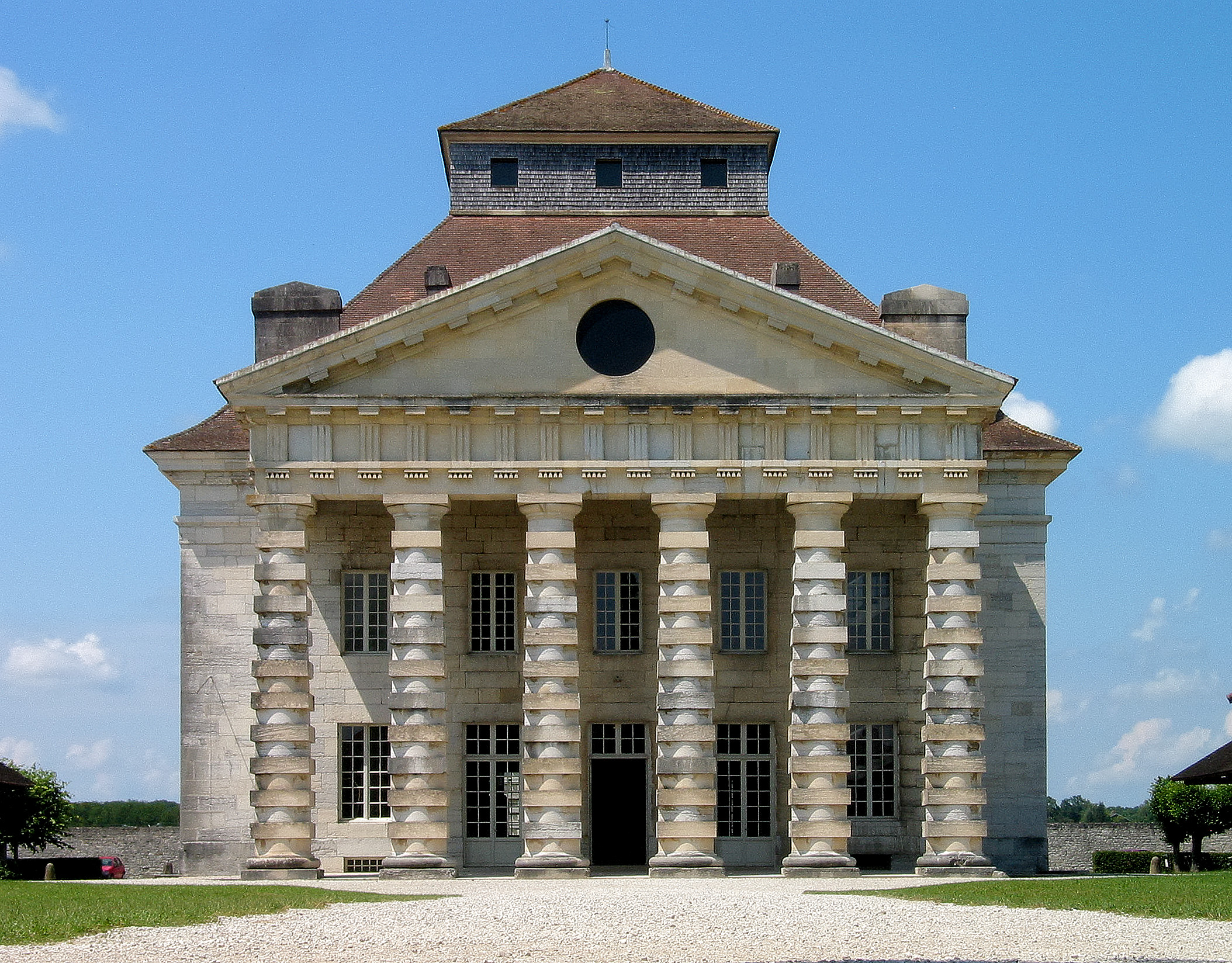
Director's house at the Royal Saltworks at Arc-et-Senans by Claude-Nicolas Ledoux (1775–1779)

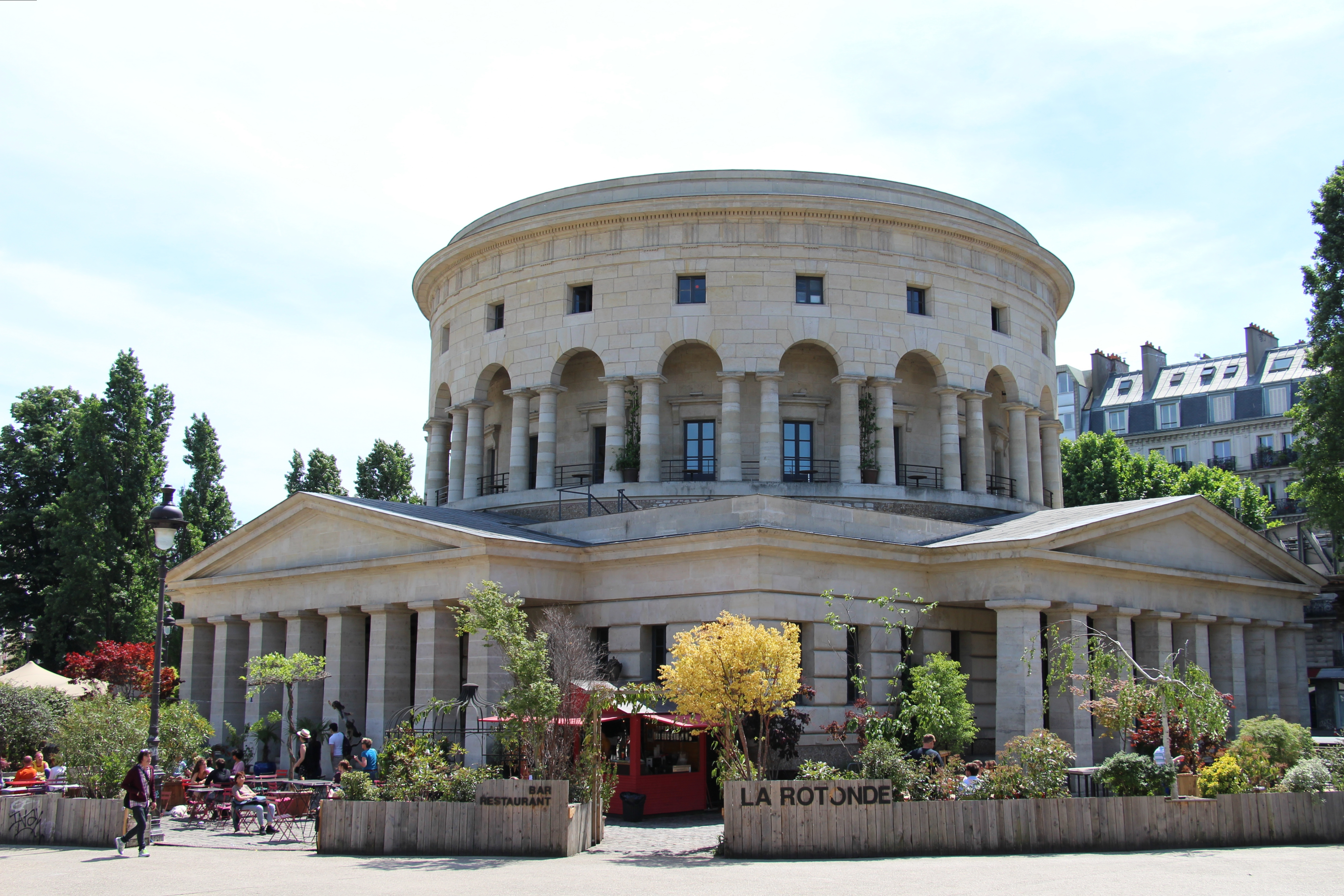
Rotonde de la Villette by Claude-Nicolas Ledoux (1785–1789)

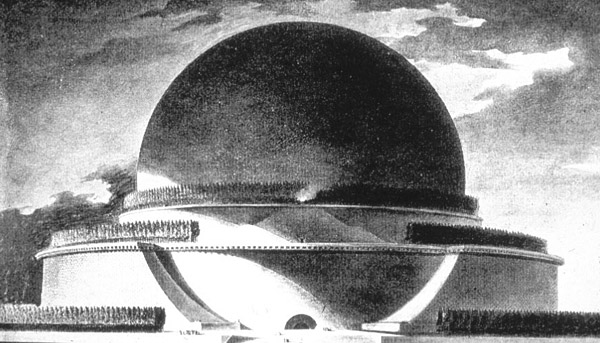
Project for a monument to Isaac Newton by Etienne-Louis Boullée (1784)

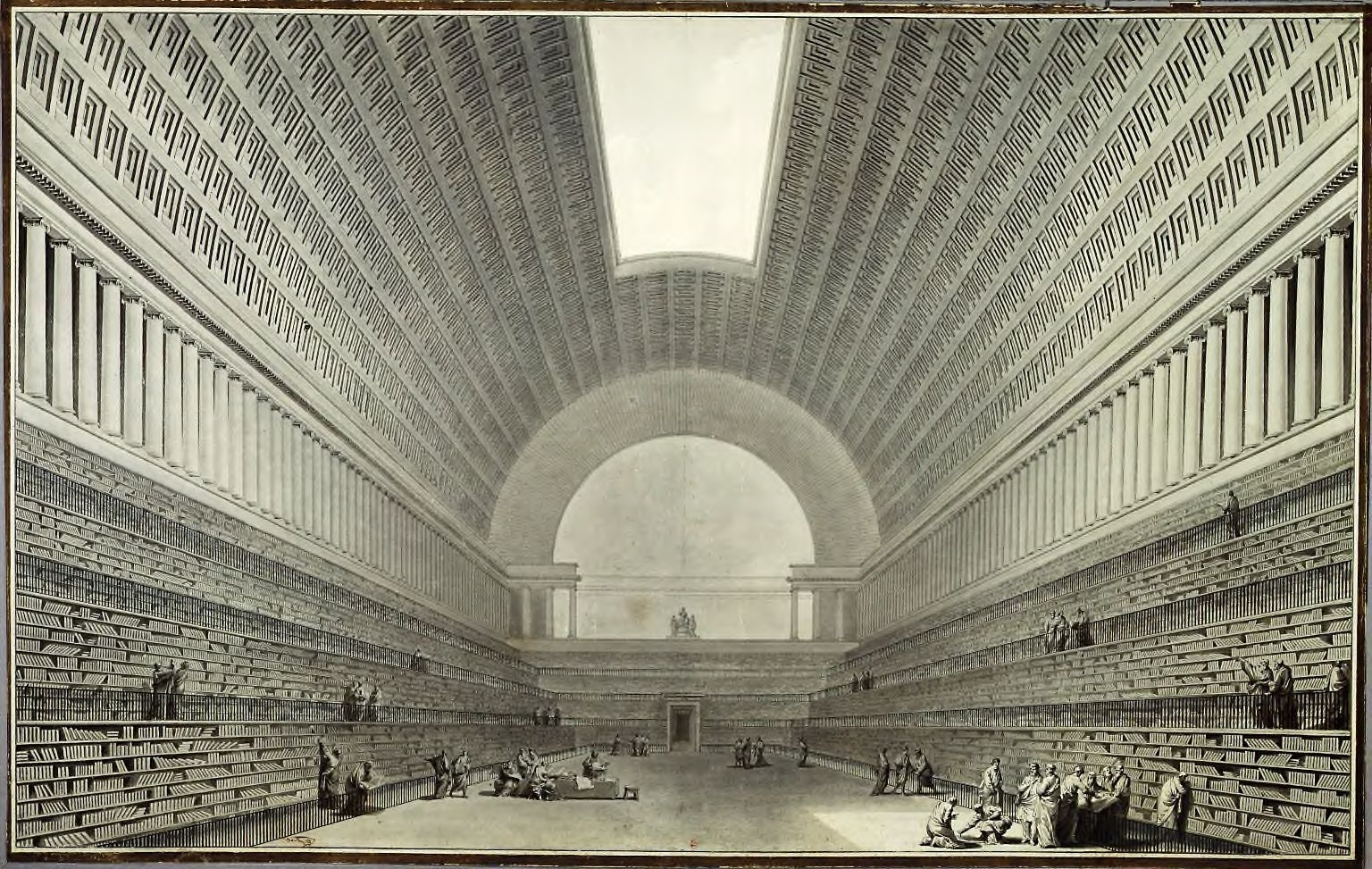
Project for the Royal Library by Etienne-Louis Boullée (1785)

== Interior decoration ==
The Louis XVI style of decoration marked the triumph of neo-classicism, which had been underway in Europe since 1770. It reflected the murals and designs found in the early archeological excavations in Herculaneum and Pompeii, and the travels of groups of artists to Greece and Asia Minor. The "taste Pompeiian" was followed by the "taste Etruscan". Motifs in interior decoration included arabesques and grotesques on the Pompeiian model. Bas-reliefs in the Greek and Roman style were popular, often in the form of rectangual friezes in bronze on furniture, or stucco, marble, molded stucco, baked earth, or simply painted in trompe-l'œil over doors. Other popular motifs included garlands of oak leaves or olive leaves, interlaced flowers, ribbons or vines, crowns of roses, flaming torches, horns of plenty, and particularly vases from which emerged flowers or vines.

In the early part of the reign of Louis XVI, interior decoration was designed to overwhelm the viewer with its scale, majesty and opulence. Grand halls served multiple purposes, for theatre entertainments, balls, or banquets. An example of the early Louis XVI style is the dining room of the Château de Maisons, rebuilt between 1777 and 1782 by François-Joseph Bélanger for the Comte d'Artois, the brother of Louis XVI. This dining room, inspired by Grand style of Louis XIV and Louis XV. It features columns of the giant order, inches, pediments, consoles, sculpture in relief, and a gigantic fireplace.

Later in the reign, the tendency shifted to smaller, more intimate and comfortable salons, studies, dining rooms and boudoirs, as the Cabinet Doré of Marie Antoinette at the Palace of Versailles (1783) and the boudoir of Marie Antoinette at Fontainebleau, in the Pompeiian style (1785). The Pompeiian style featured mythical animals, such as sphinxes and griffons, horns of plenty, and vases of flowers mounted on tripods. The style also was frequently used in friezes and cameos, in medallions and in white on blue Wedgwood porcelain. In the later years of the Louis XVI style, the decorative panels were divided into often geometric divisions, either circles or octagons,

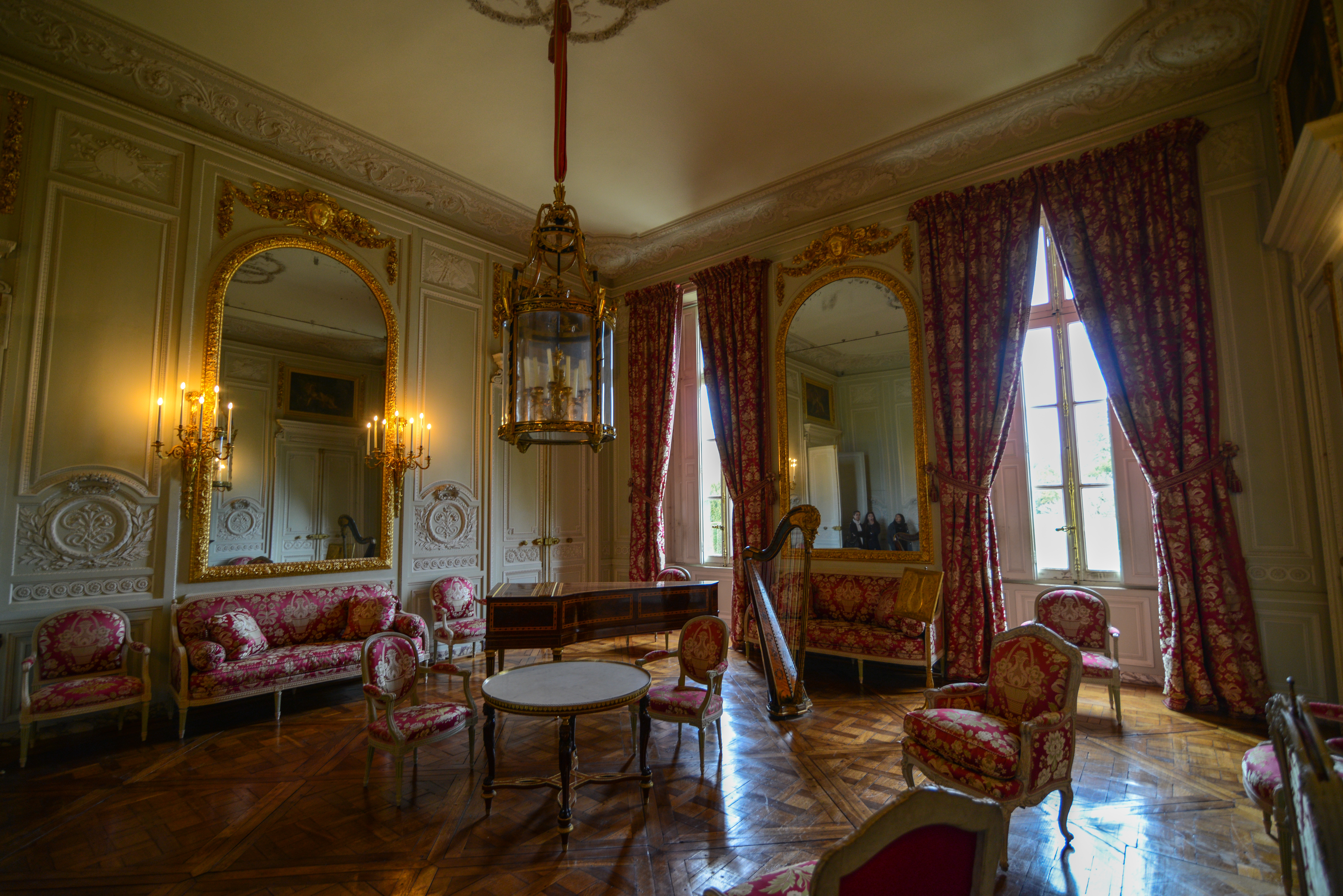
The Salon de Compagnie of the Petit Trianon (1762–1768)

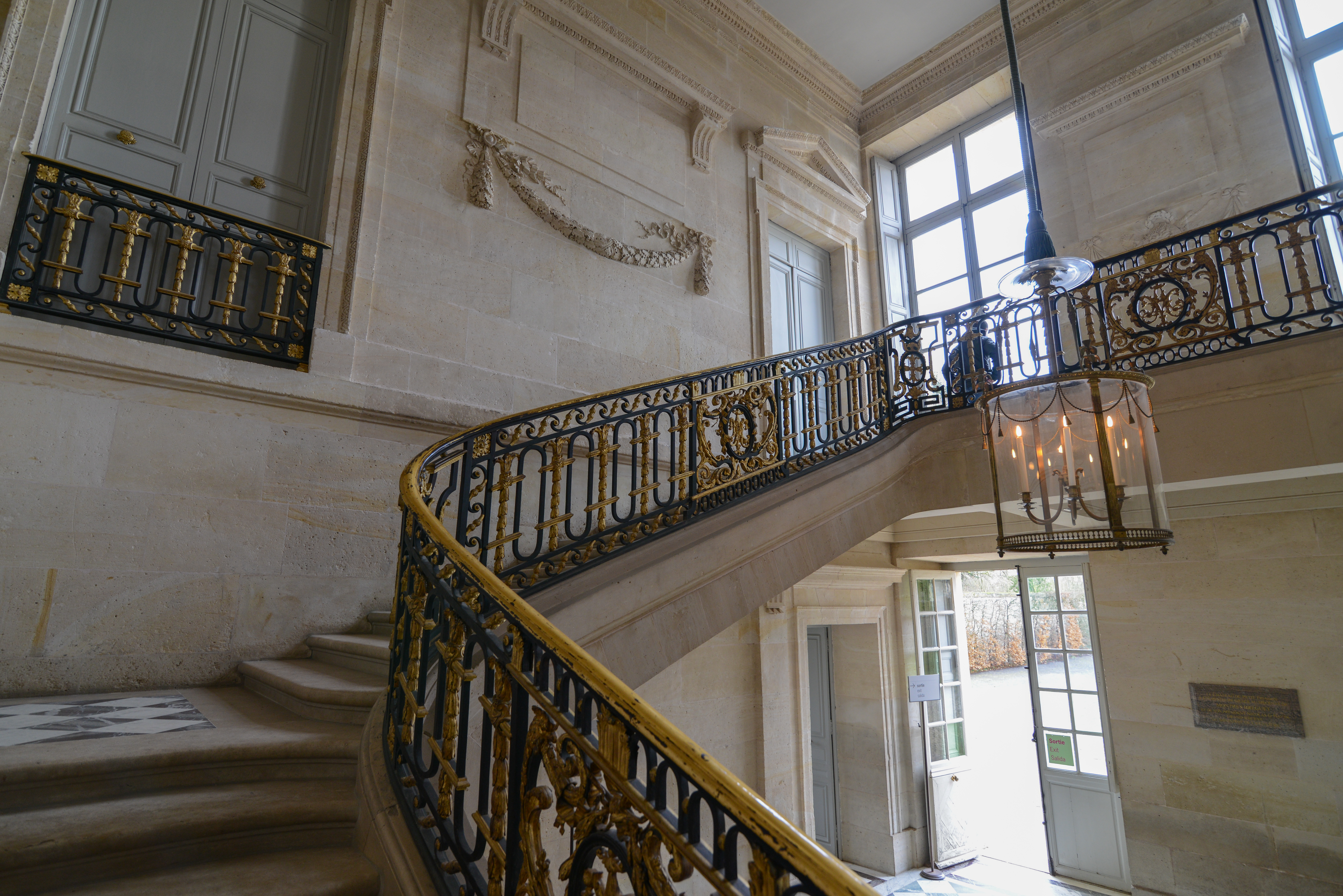
Staircase of the Petit Trianon (1762–1768)

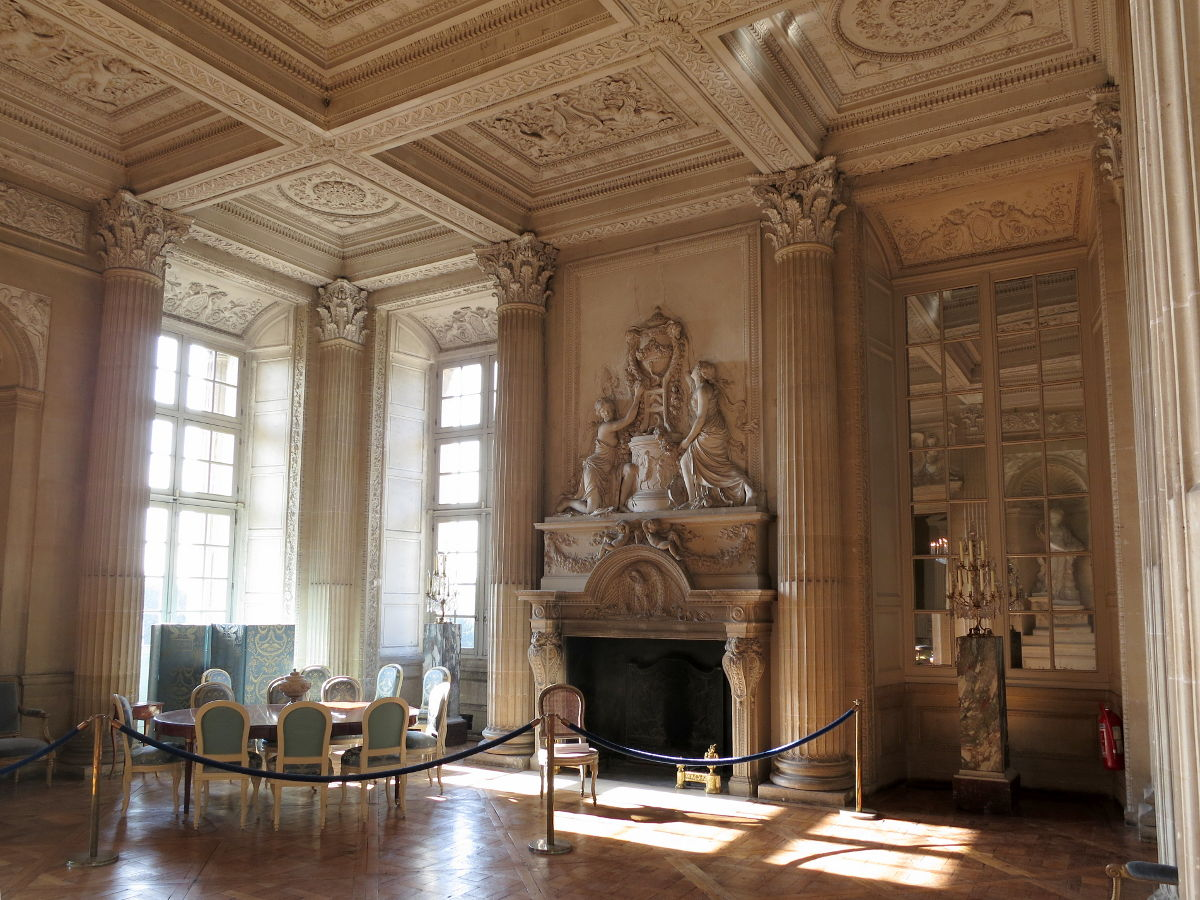
The Dining Room of the Château de Maisons by François-Joseph Bélanger (1777–1782)

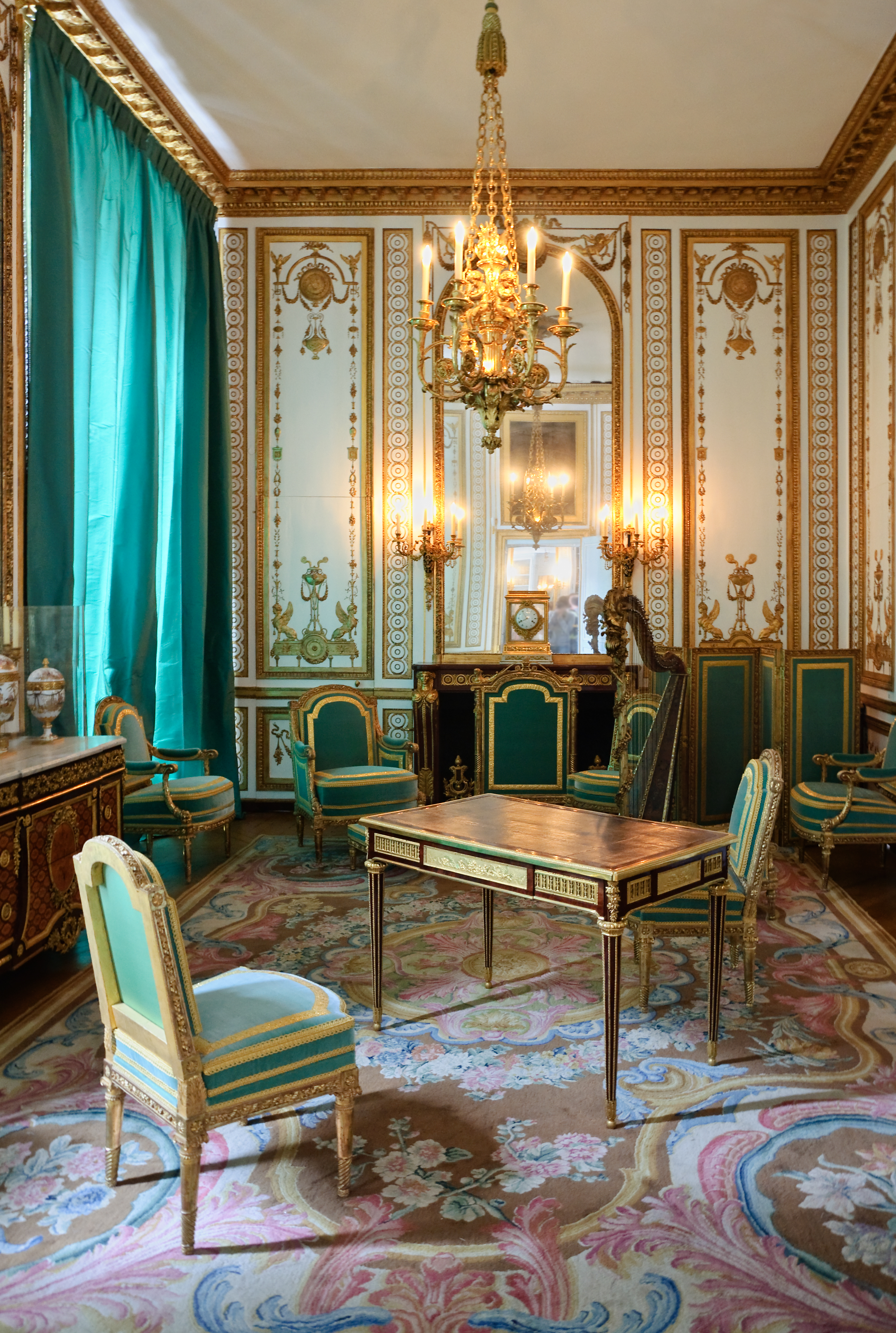
The Cabinet Doré of Marie-Antoinette at the Palace of Versailles (1783)

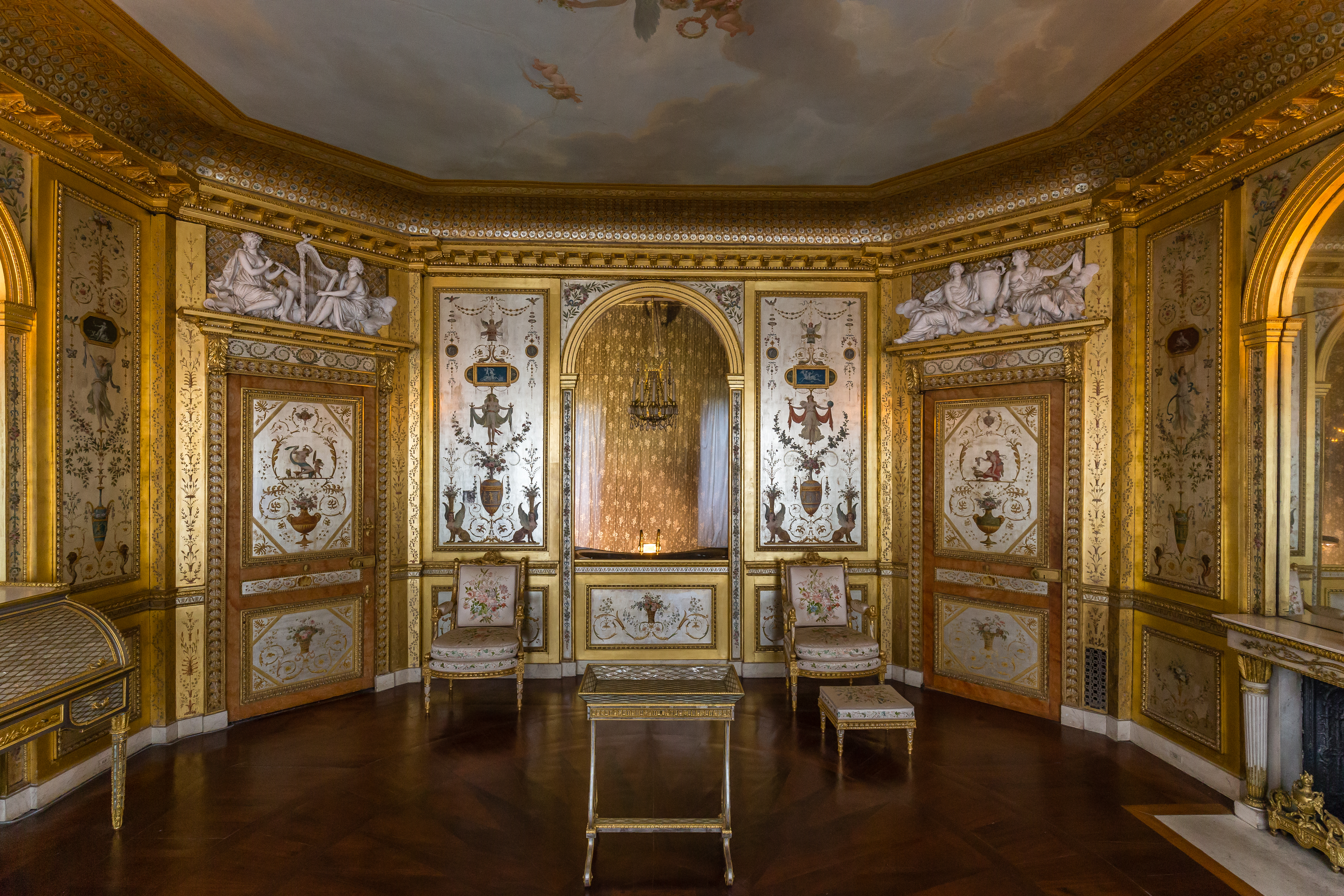
The Boudoir of Marie-Antoinette at the Palace of Fontainebleau in the Pompeiian Style (1785)

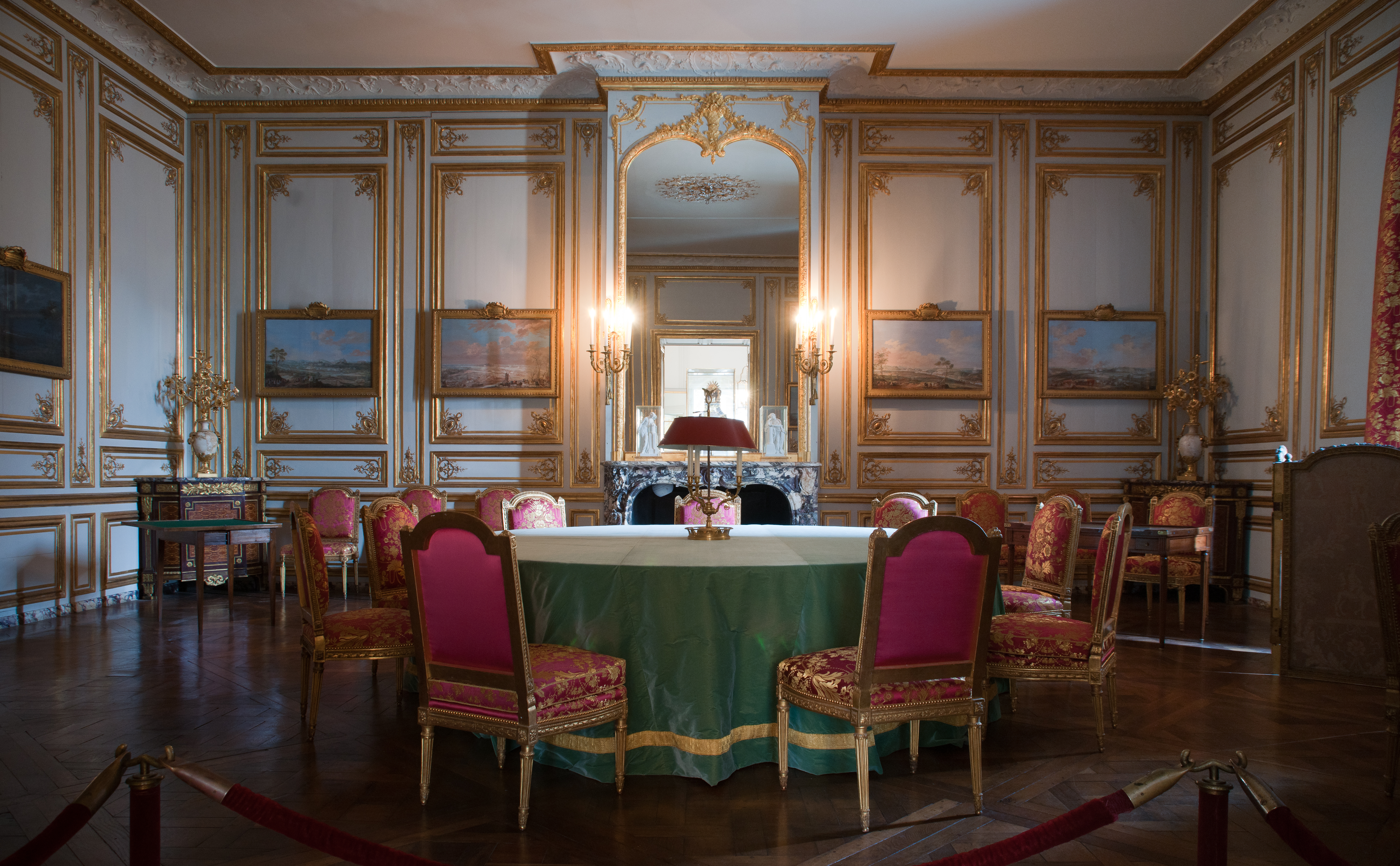
The Game Room in King's small apartments at Palace of Versailles. (1785). Chairs by Jean-Baptiste Boulard (1785), corner tables by Jean-Henri Riesener (1774).

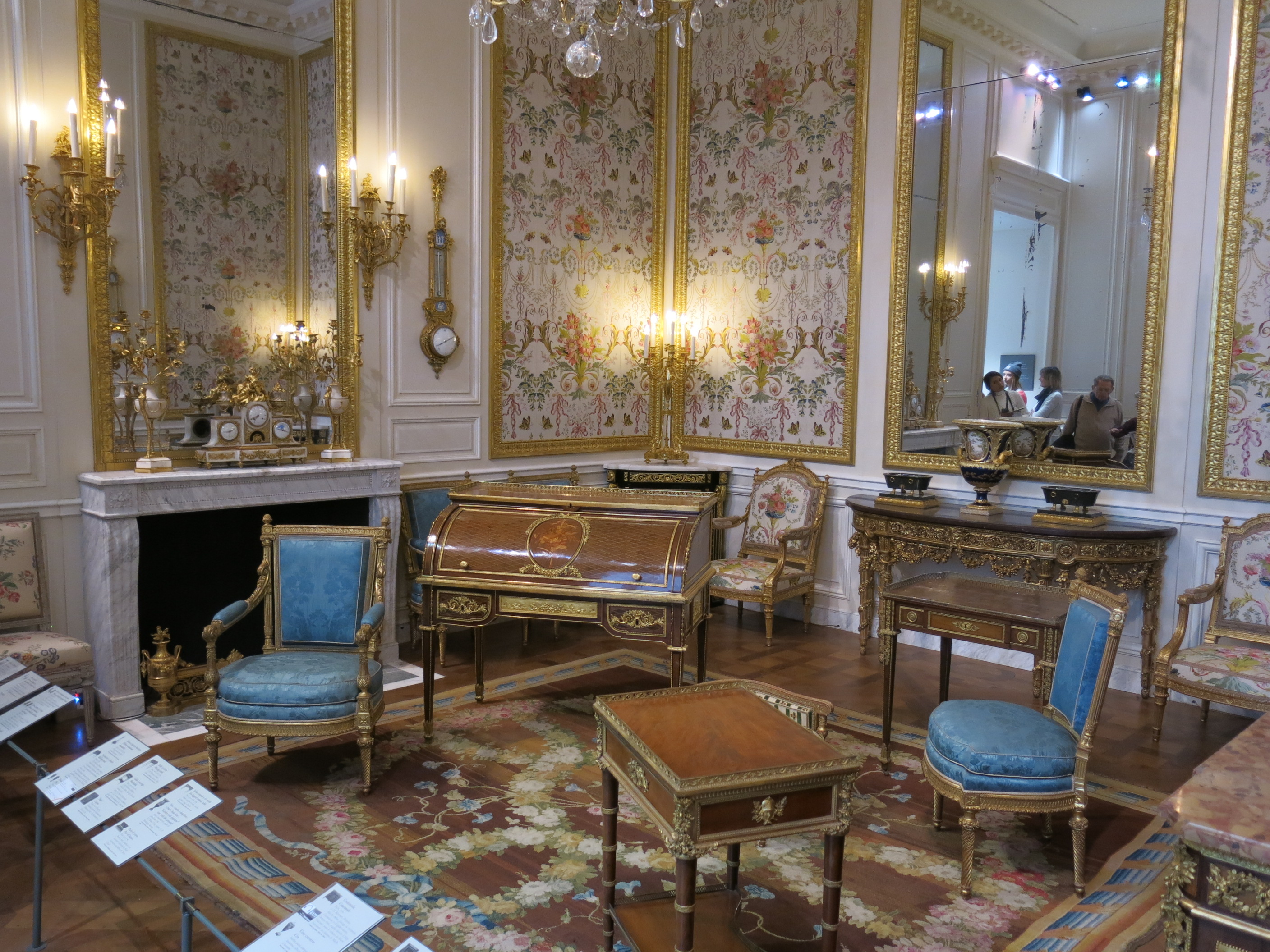
The Salle Marie Antoinette of the Louvre

== Furniture ==
Louis XVI style furniture, particularly the furniture made for the royal palaces, is among the most finely crafted and valuable ever produced in France. Much of it was produced at the Garde-Meuble du Roi, the royal furniture workshop, directed by Francois II Foliot (1748–1808). Among the notable craftsmen of the period were Georges Jacob, who made a suite of sofas and chairs for the apartments of Marie Antoinette at Versailles and for those of the Comte d'Artois, the King's brother, at the Temple. Oak, mahogany and walnut were the woods most commonly used. The chairs of the early period made for Marie Antoinette were richly decorated gilded carvings, usually with floral patterns. The chairs and sofas were usually upholstered in satin, with more elaborate medallions embroidered in silk attached. Later in the period, more exotic themes, often taken from popular theatre productions in Paris, appeared in decoration of furniture. These included Chinese, Arabesque, and Etruscan figures. A variety of specialized pieces of furniture were created, including lightweight chairs for men sitting at gambling tables, and specialized chairs for boudoirs, dressing rooms, libraries, and antechambers.

The beds, especially in the chambers de parade or ceremonial bedrooms of the royal palaces, were of monumental proportions and were usually separated from the rest of the room by a balustrade. These beds were termed à la Duchesse, and featured an ornate canopy over the bed. The sculpted and gilded wood frame of the silk embroidered canopy over the bed of Marie Antoinette at Fontainebleau, installed in 1787, was so heavy that two additional columns were placed under it at night avoid its collapse.

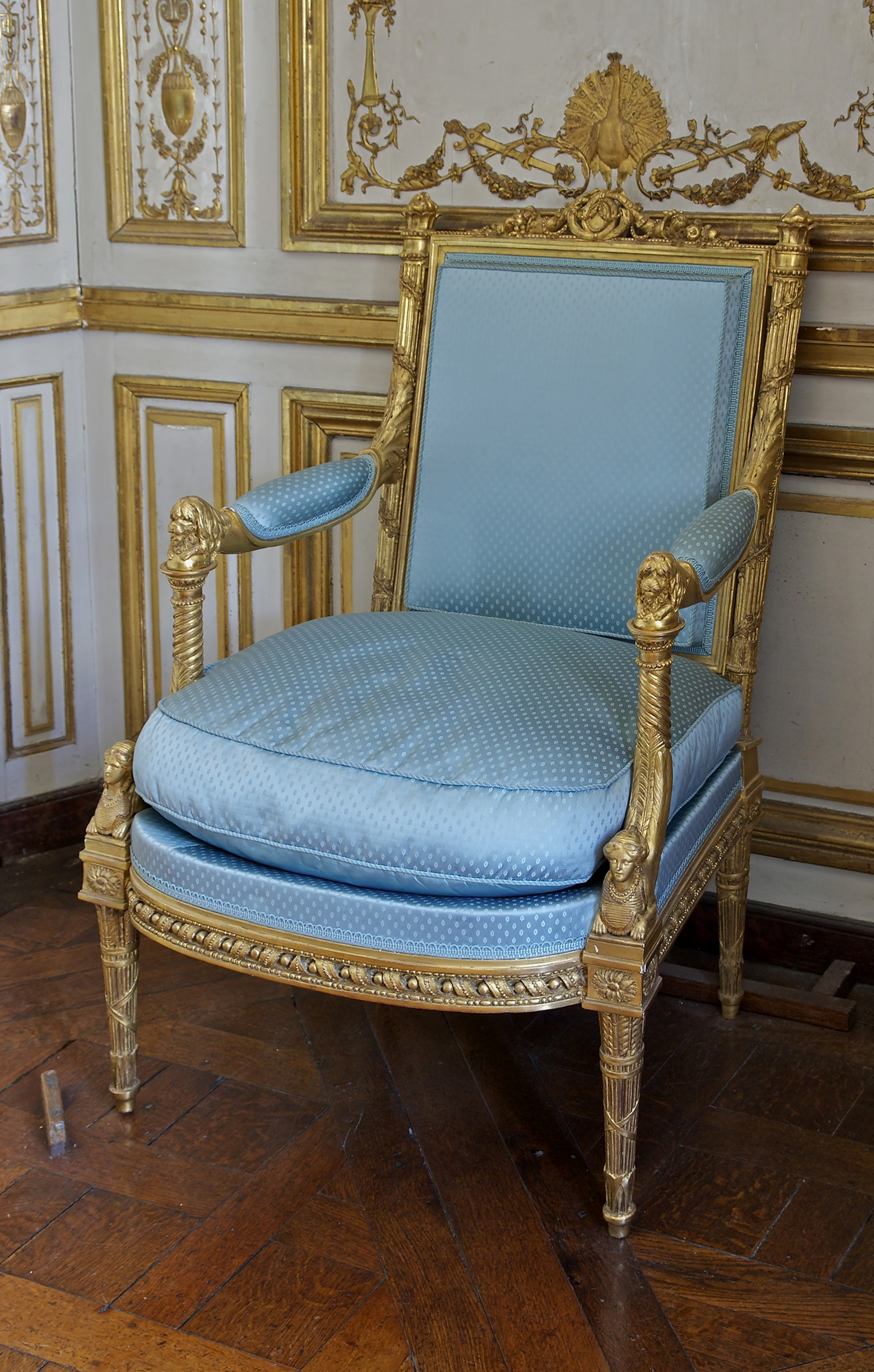
Armchair by Georges Jacob for the apartments of Marie-Antoinette at Versailles

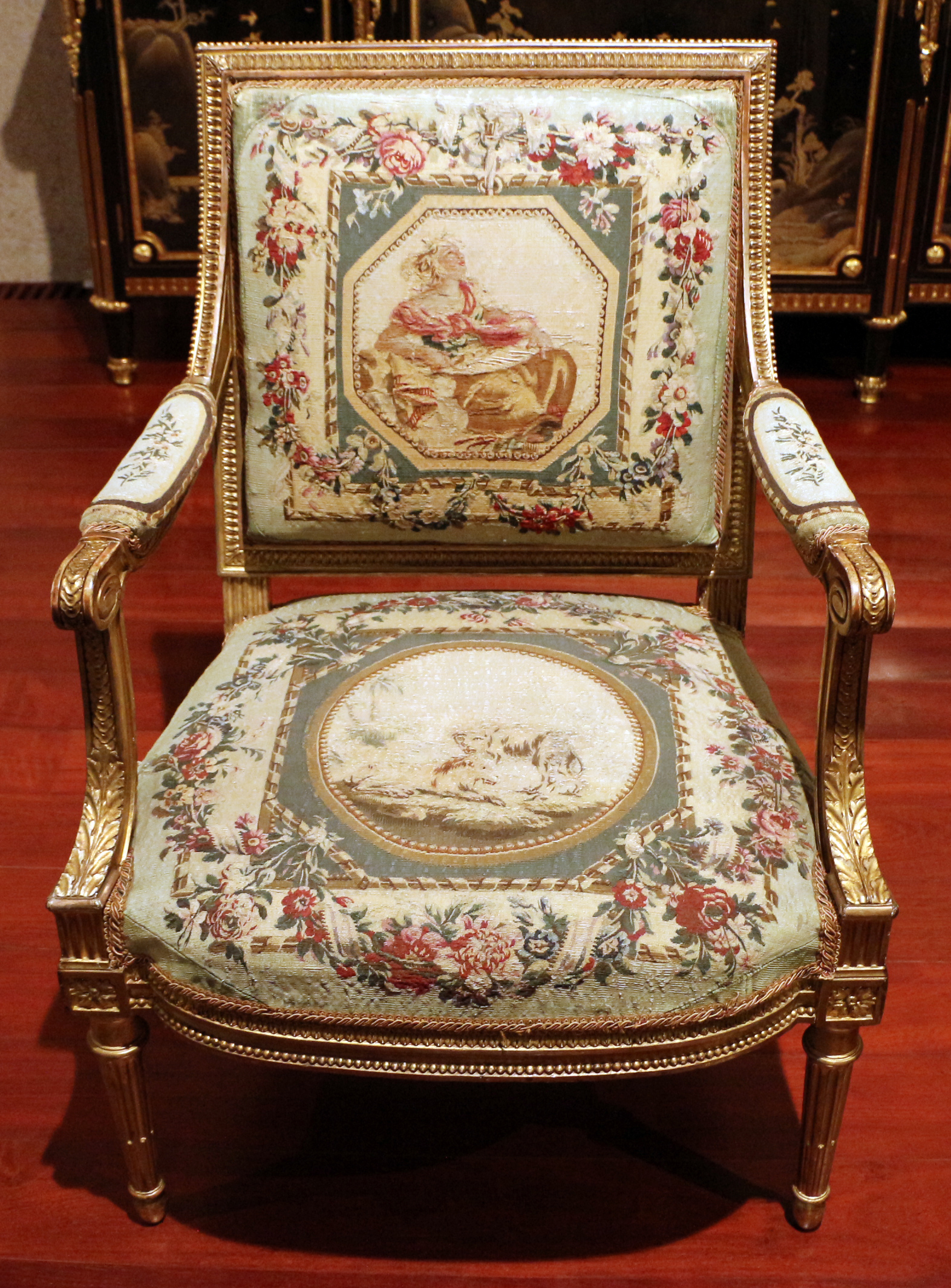
Armchair by Jean-Baptiste Séné with Beauvais tapestry upholstery (1780–1785)

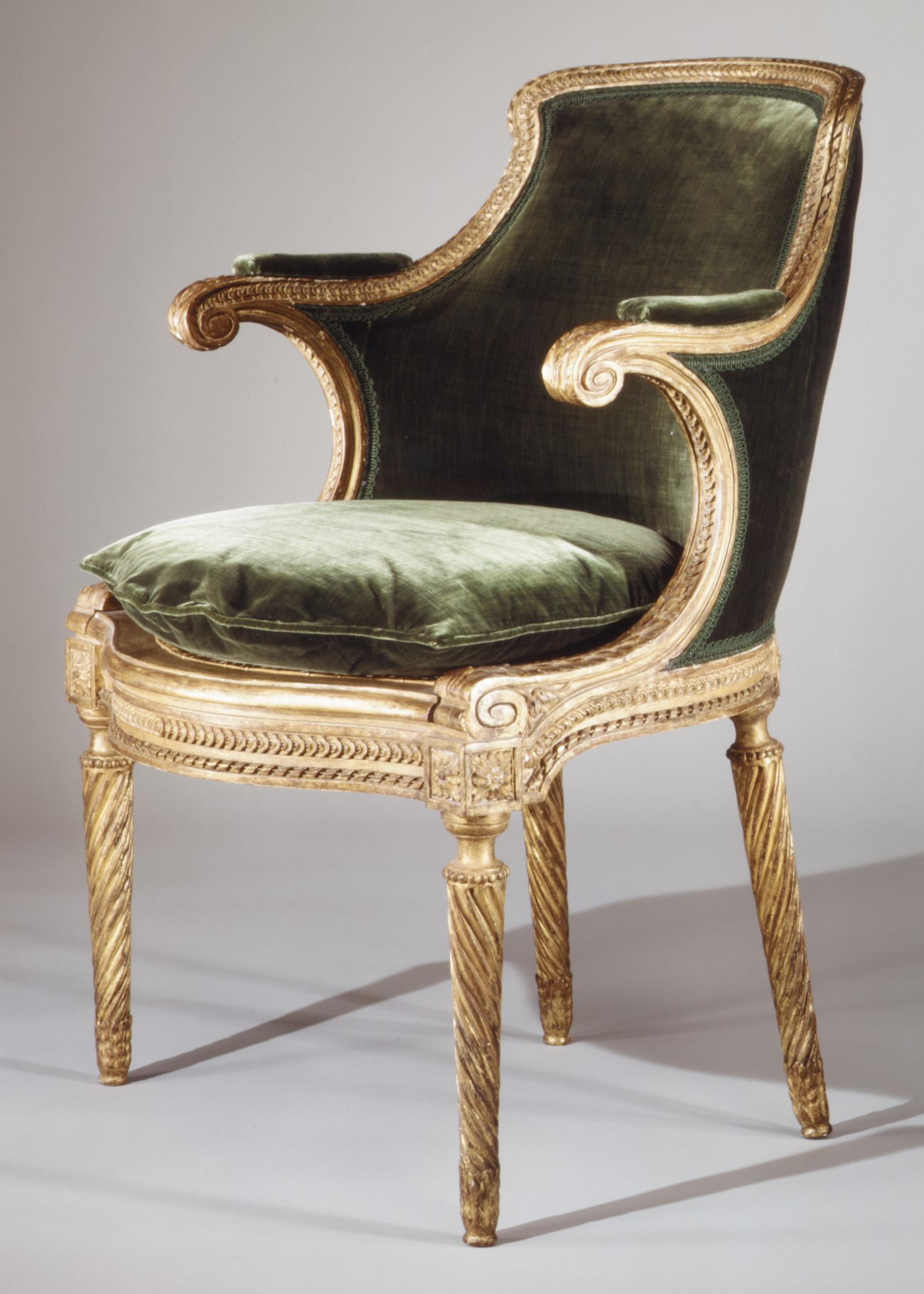
Armchair by Georges Jacob

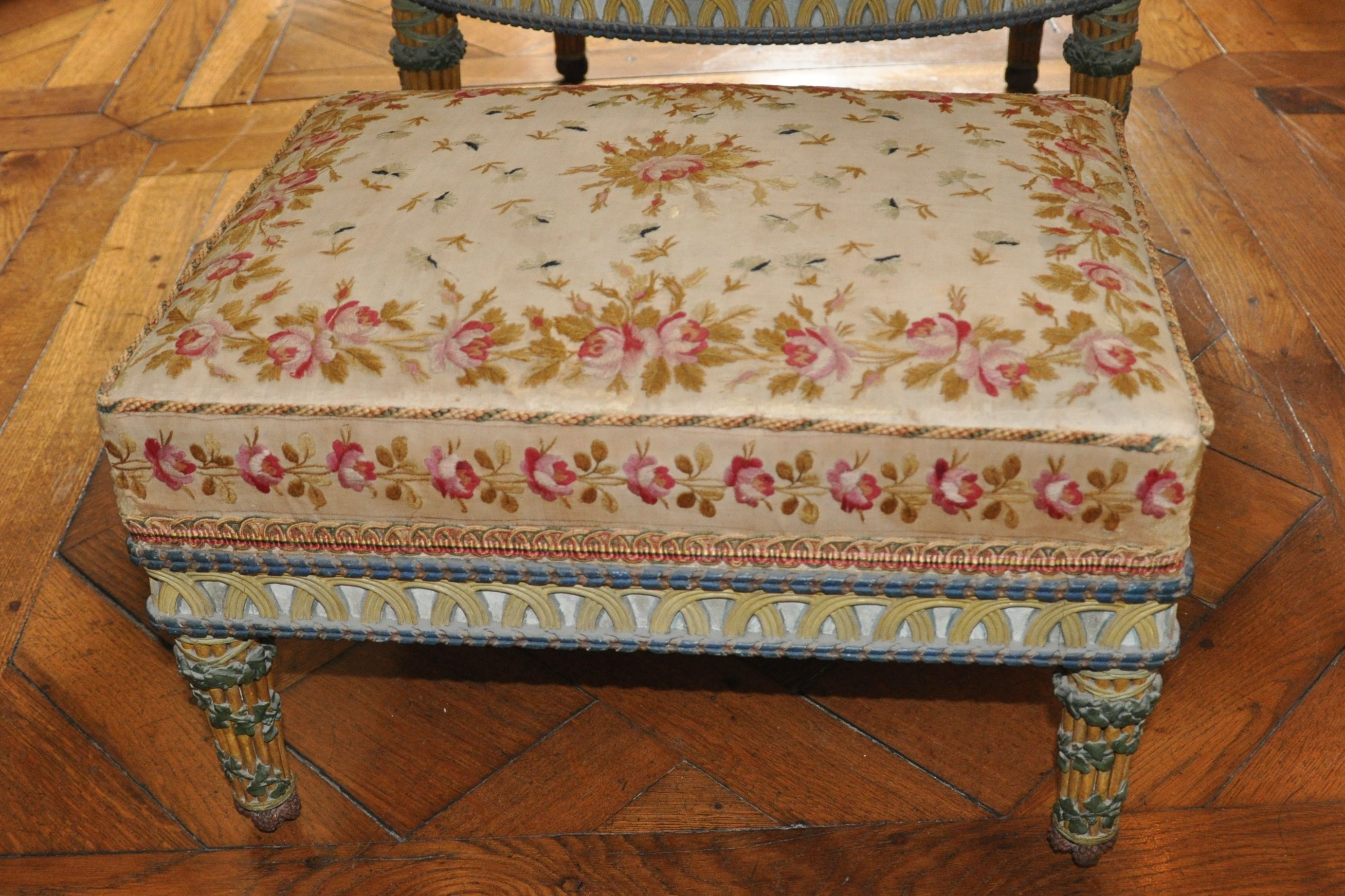
Tabouret from the Petit Trianon by Georges Jacob (1787)

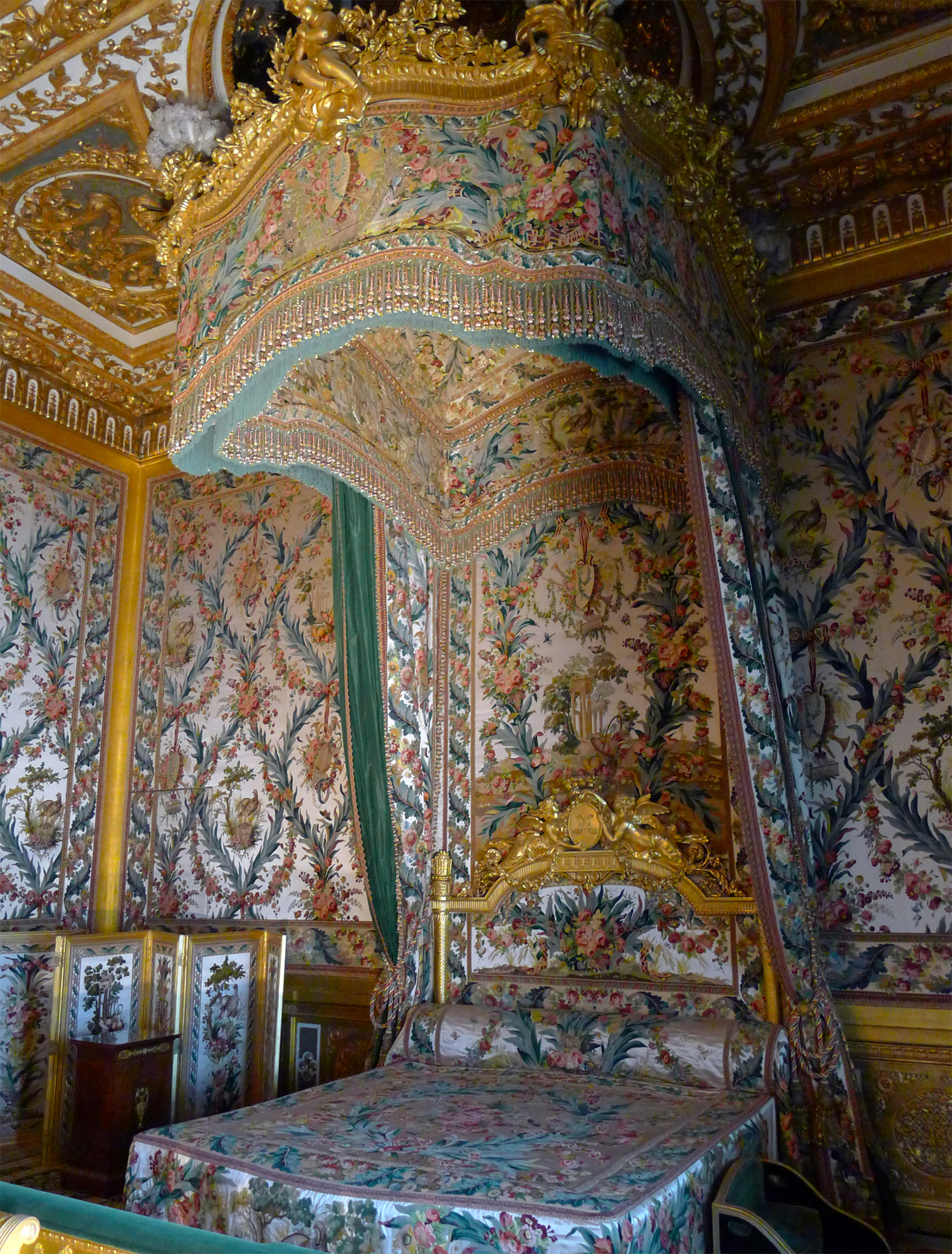
Bed of Marie Antoinette at Palace of Fontainebleau by Jean-Baptiste Séné (1787)

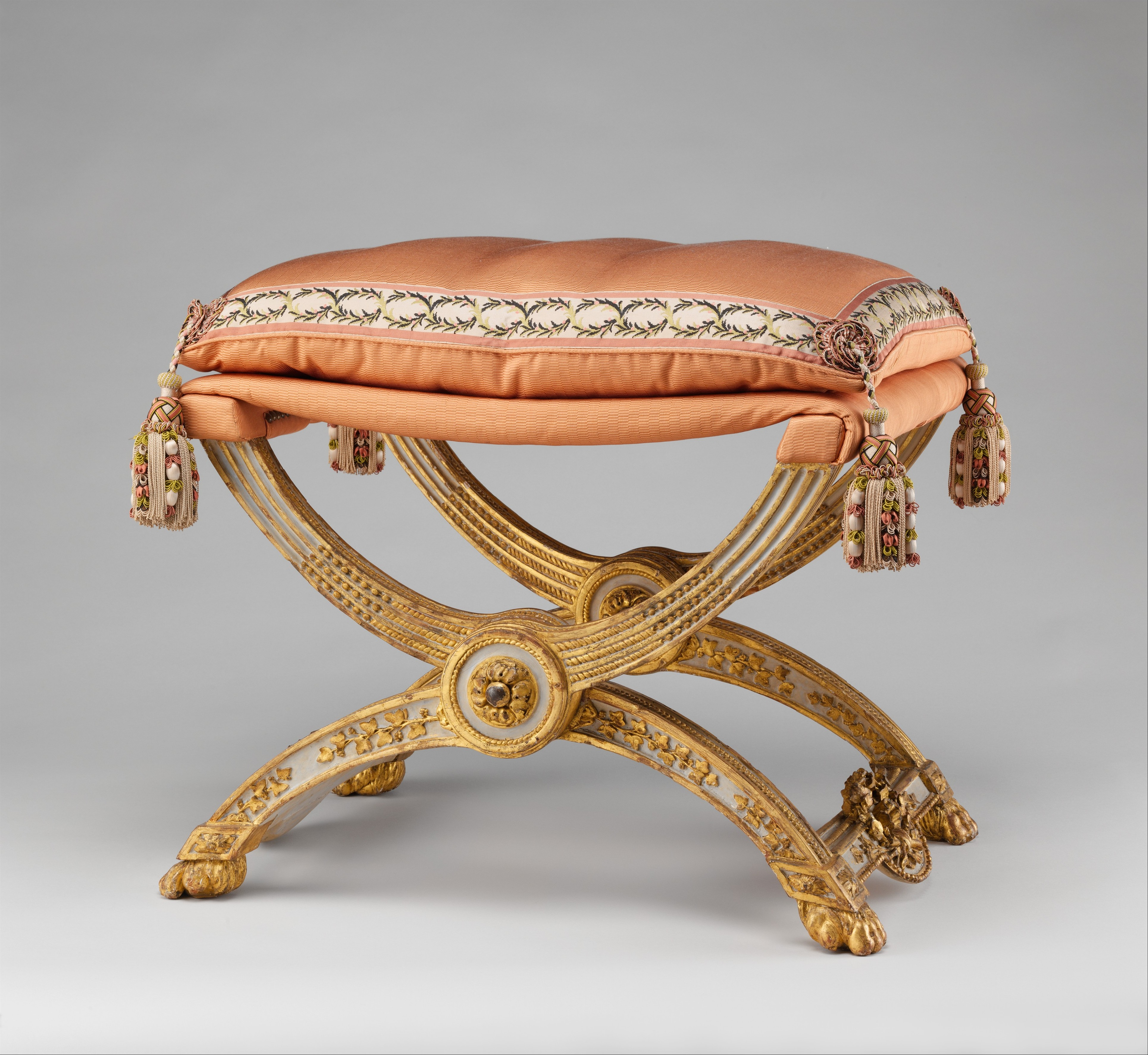
Folding stool by Jean-Baptiste Séné

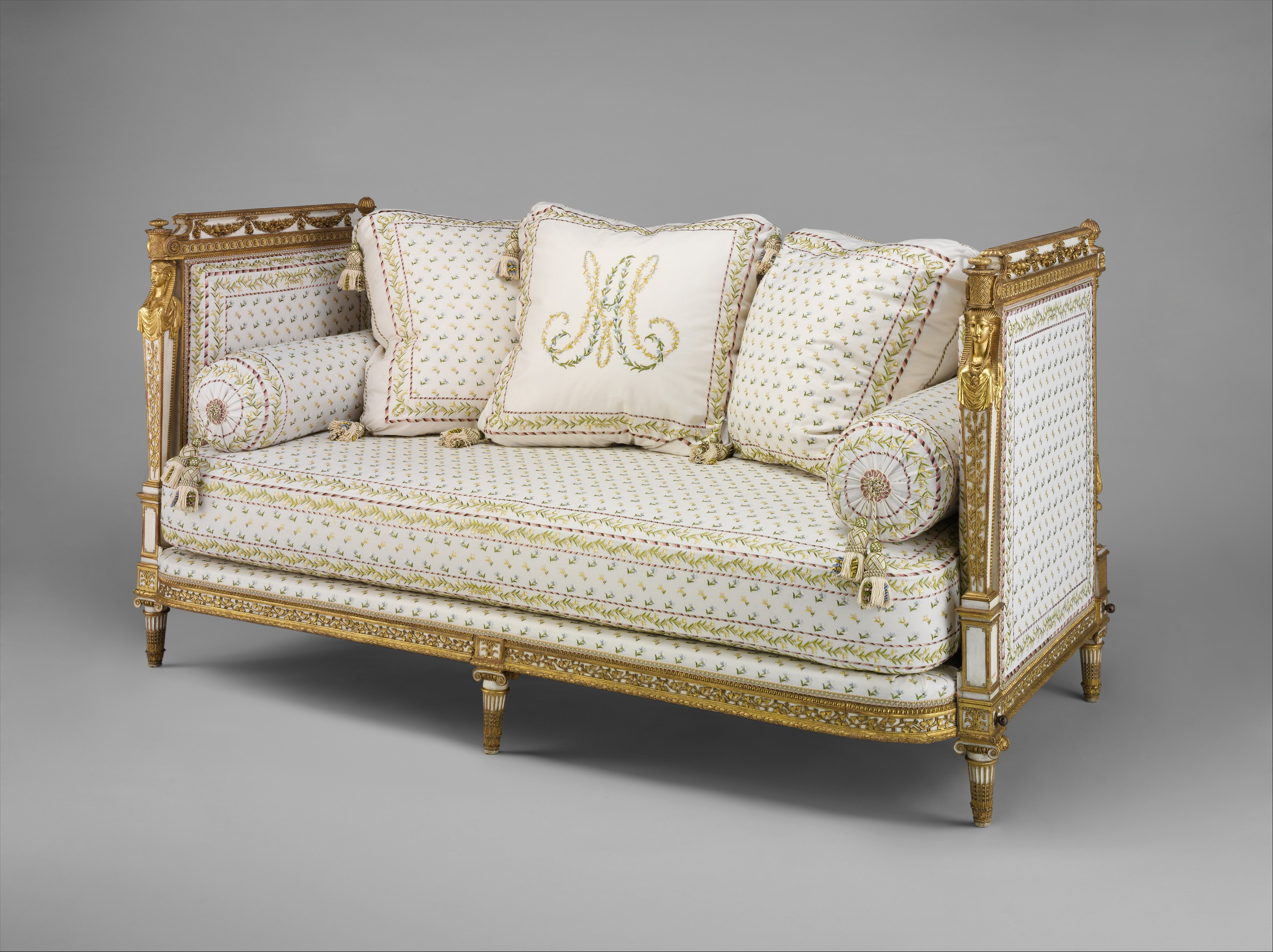
Daybed or Lit de repos by Jean-Baptiste-Claude Sené (1788), Metropolitan Museum

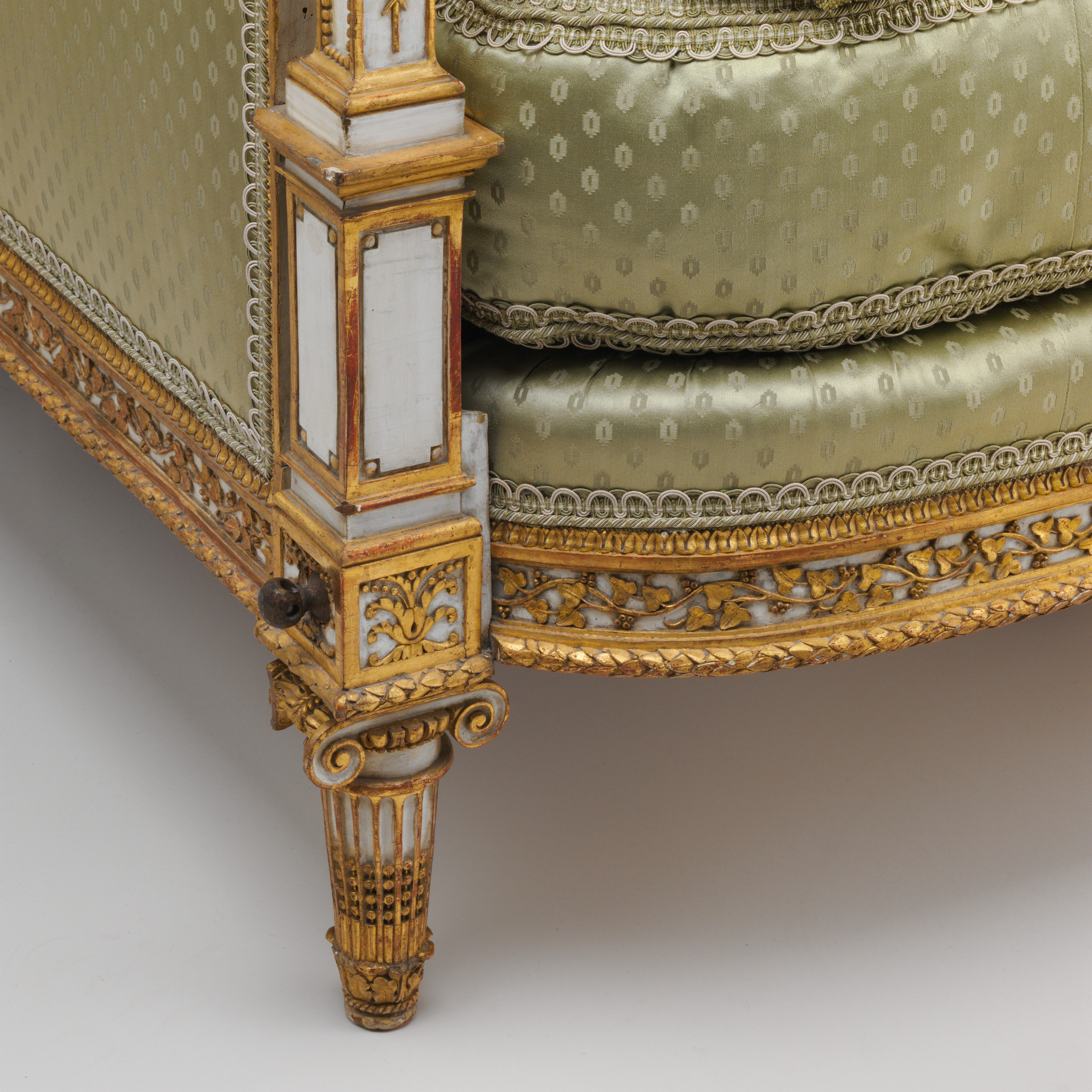
Detail of a daybed by Jean-Baptiste Sené

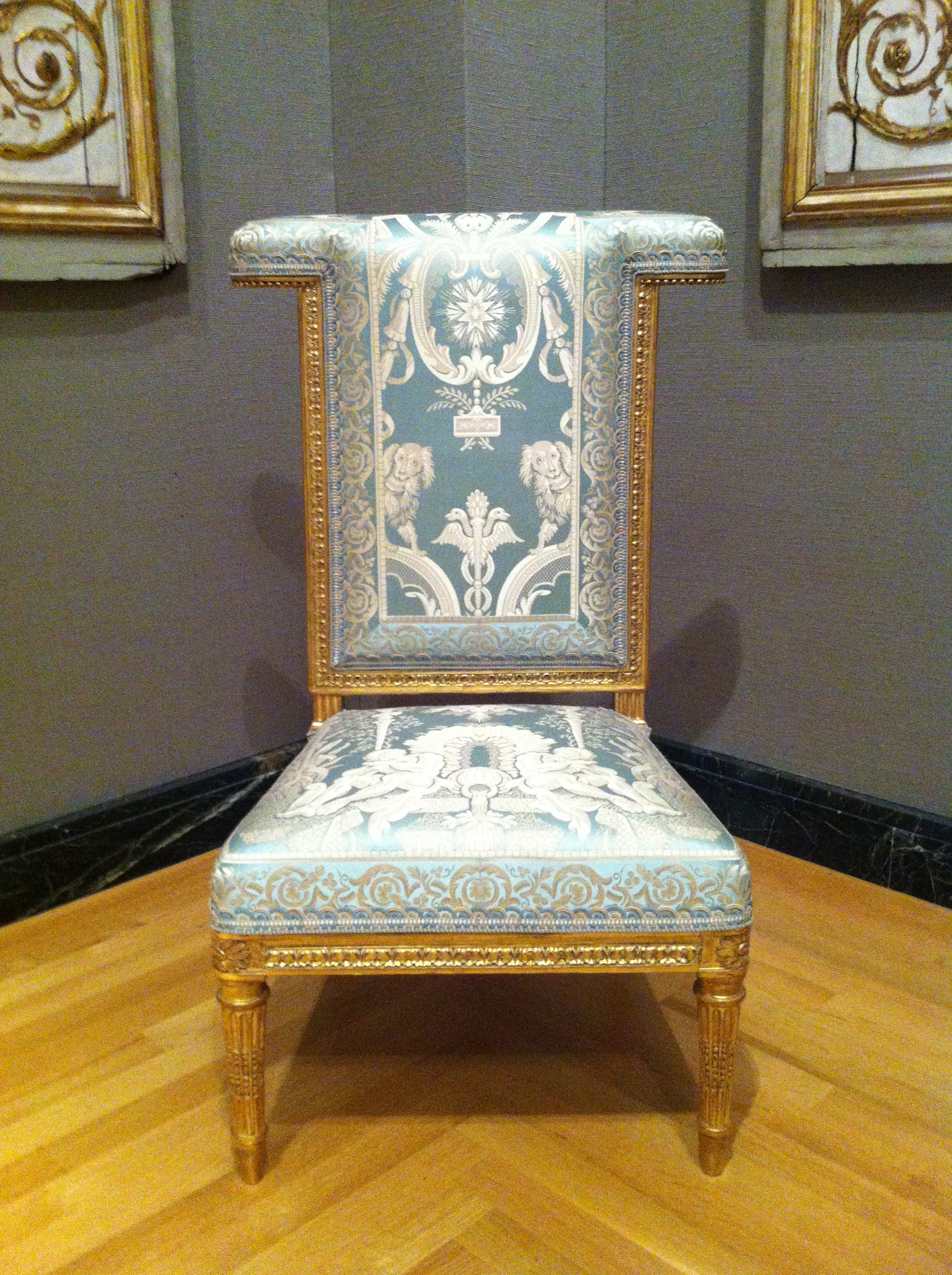
Chaise voyeuse by Jean-Baptiste-Claude Sené (1787)

== Cabinet-making and marquetry ==
The craft of the ébéniste, or cabinet-maker, was considered separate from that of other furniture-makers. About a third of the ébénistes in Paris were of foreign origin, either second-generation immigrants from Belgium and the Netherlands or first-generation from the Rhineland. The latter group included some of the most famous craftsmen, including Jean-Henri Riesener, who became a master in 1768, and David Roentgen. They received special protection and patronage from Marie-Antoinette, who admired German craftsmanship.

Several new varieties of the furniture were introduced, including a commode in the form of half-moon form, and the commode dessert, which had a door in the front with shelves on either side. The commode bonheur-du-jour was a dressing table for a boudoir, with a small armoire on top, with either a mirror or a curtain. The table à la Tronchin, named after Jean Robert Tronchin, was a table with a built-in-shelf which could be raised by a mechanism for reading. Some of the furniture was small and designed to be easily moved, to quickly rearrange salons. These included the table bouillotte, a small round table with four legs and drawer.

The tables and cabinets were usually decorated with sculpted and gilded bronze ornament, often in the forms of stylized roses, knotted ribbons, or pine cones. The surfaces were frequently inlaid with plaques of different colored exotic woods or mother-of-pearl, forming either a chequerboard pattern, a pattern of cubes, or more intricate designs. Sometimes the wood was dyed to achieve the color contrast, or pieces of wood were laid with the grain in different directions. Riesener was especially known for richly ornamented surfaces. Roentgen was particularly famous for his desks, which featured a variety of mechanical features as well as superb woodwork.

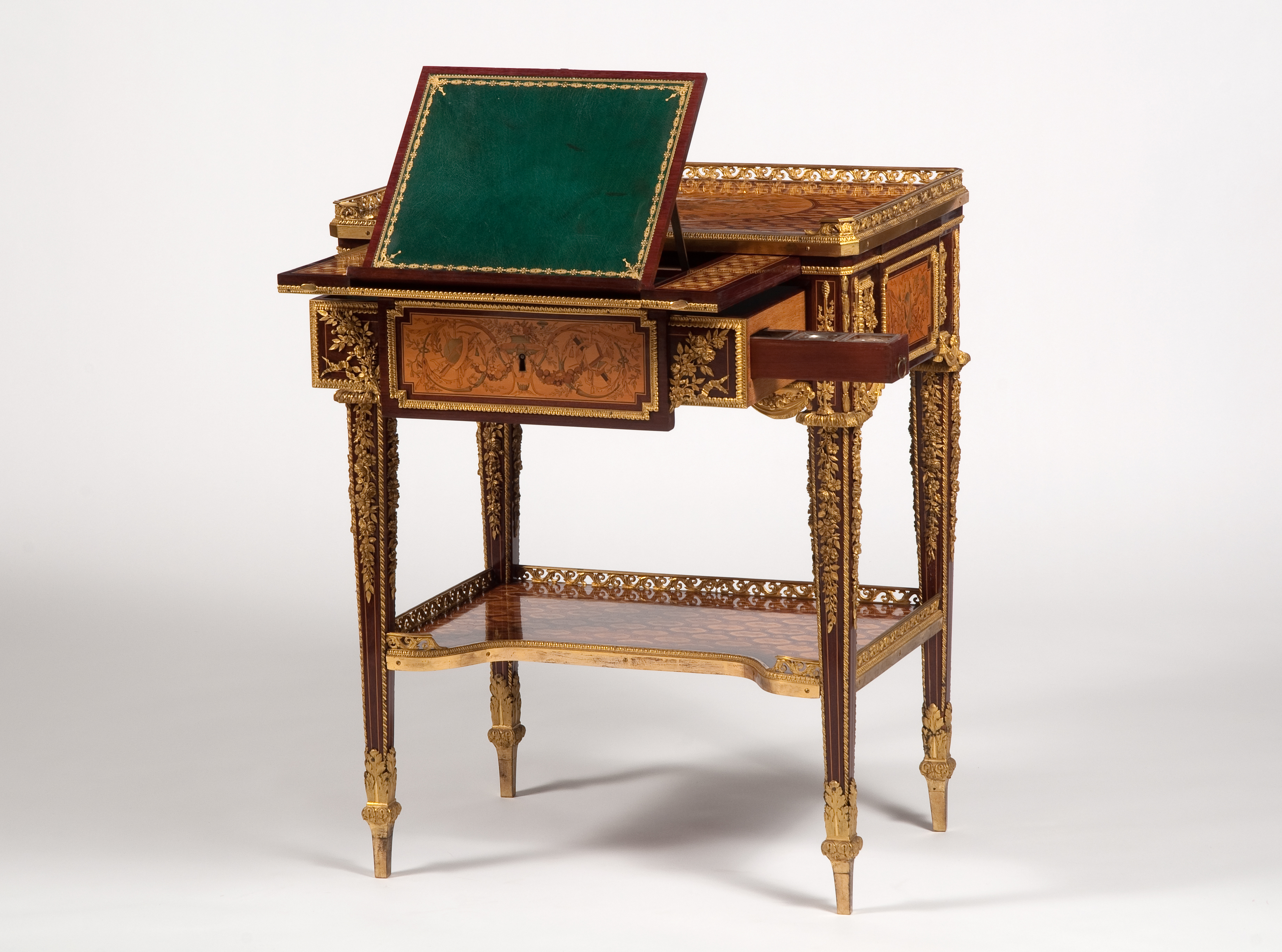
Writing table made for Marie Antoinette by Jean-Henri Riesener, (1780–1785)

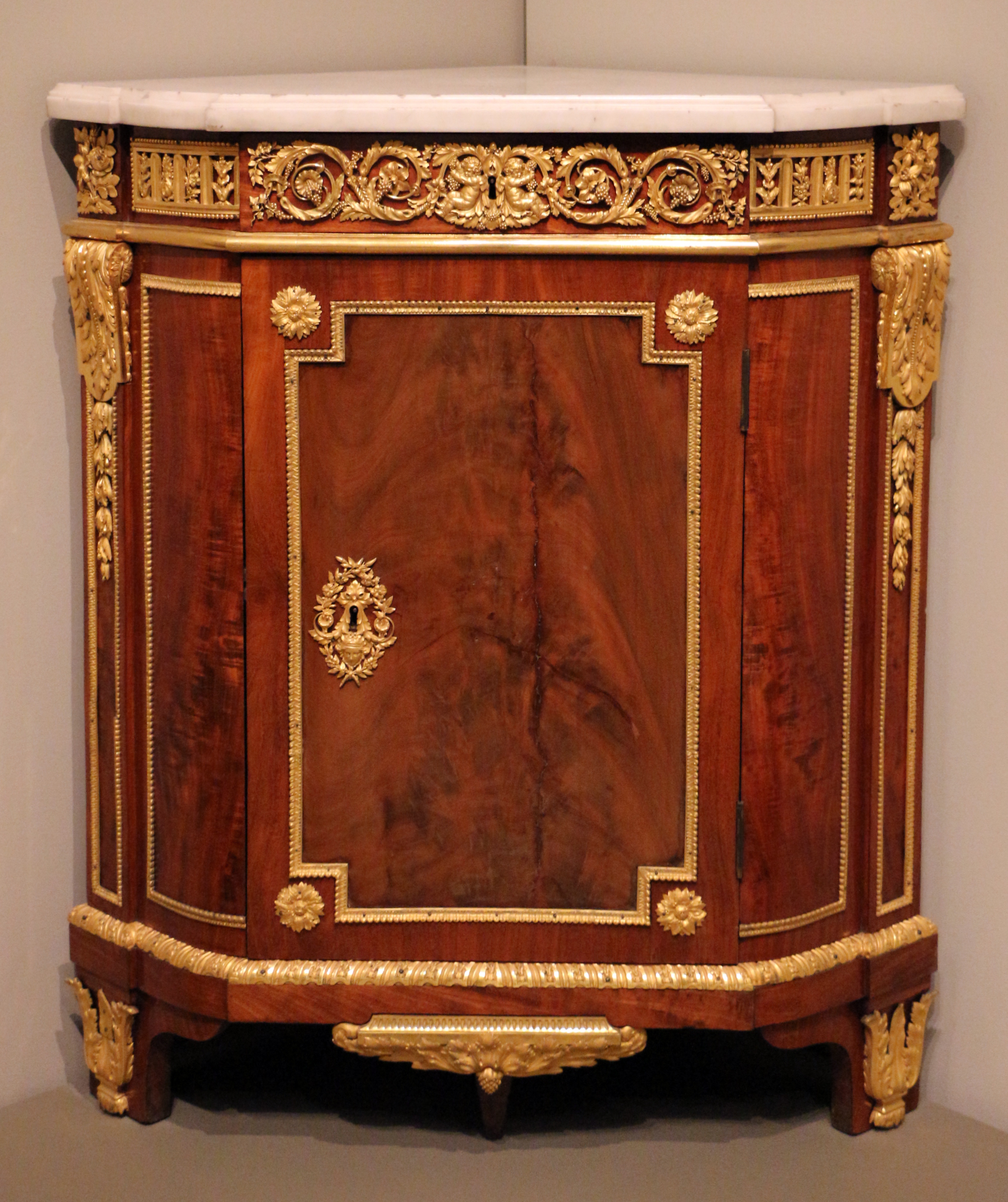
Corner commode by Jean-Henri Riesener (1785)

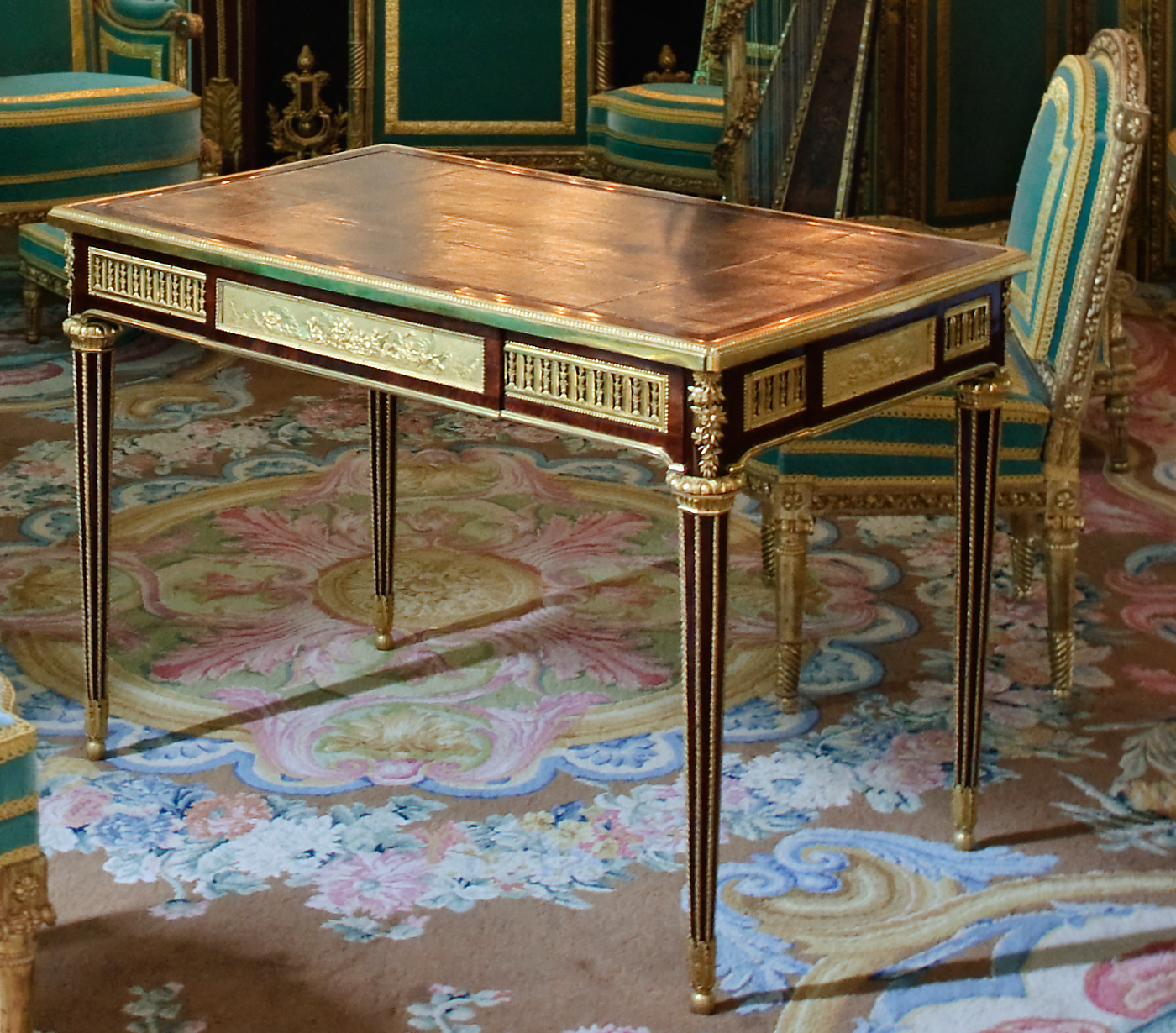
Table for Marie-Antoinette by Jean-Henri Riesener (1785)

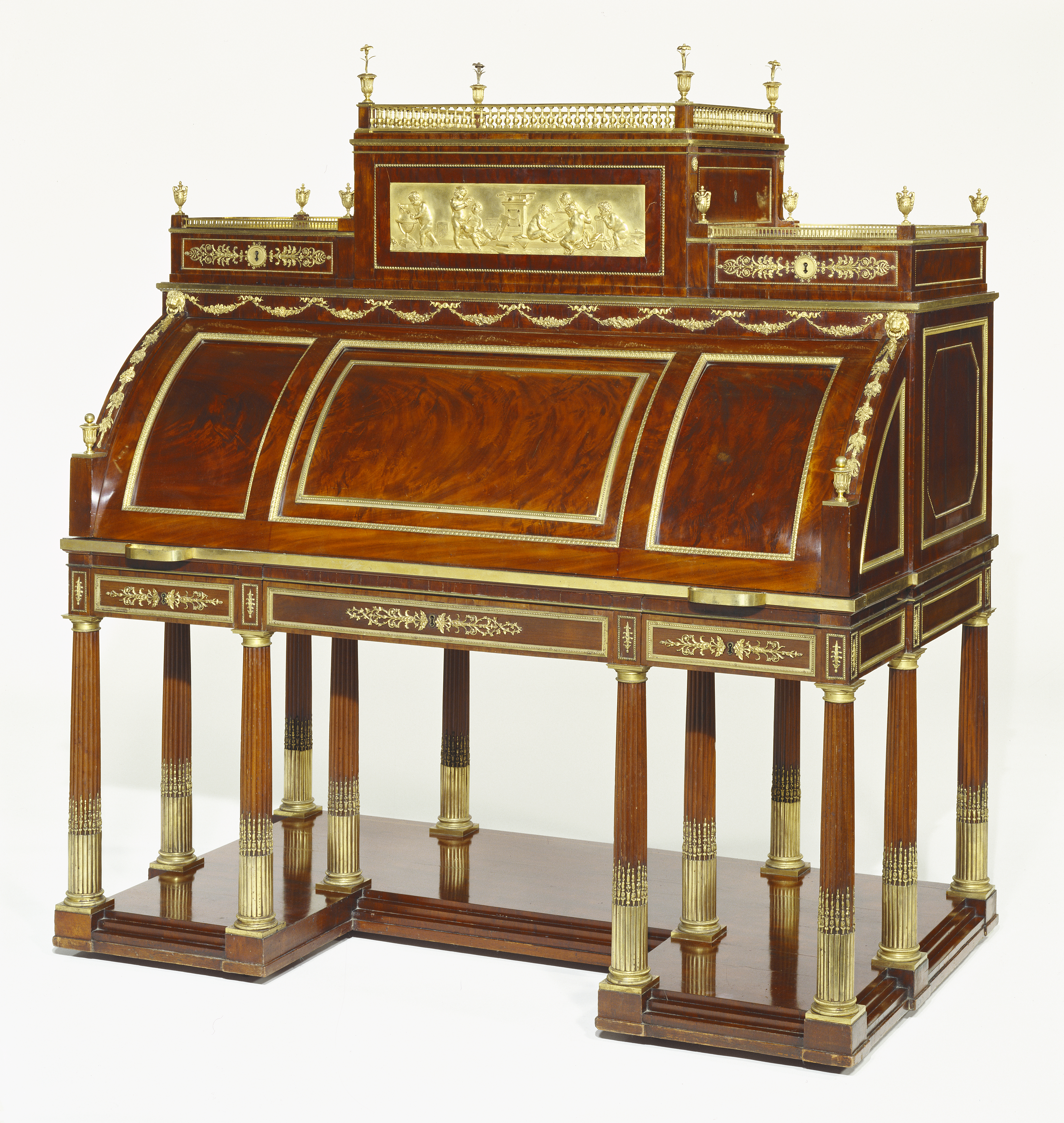
Rolltop desk by David Roentgen (about 1785)

== Tapestry ==
The royal tapestry workshop of Gobelins continued to produce high-quality large works for royal residences and the nobility, but tastes had changed. The immense tapestries celebrating historical events were largely out of style. Instead of creating new designs, the manufactures of Gobelins, Beauvais, and Aubusson recycled old designs, such as the Metamorphoses of Boucher. An increasing amount of the work was the creation of designs, especially polychrome floral patterns, for the upholstery of the royal furniture. The other two major tapestry workshops, Aubusson and Beauvais, also oriented their work primarily to furniture upholstery.

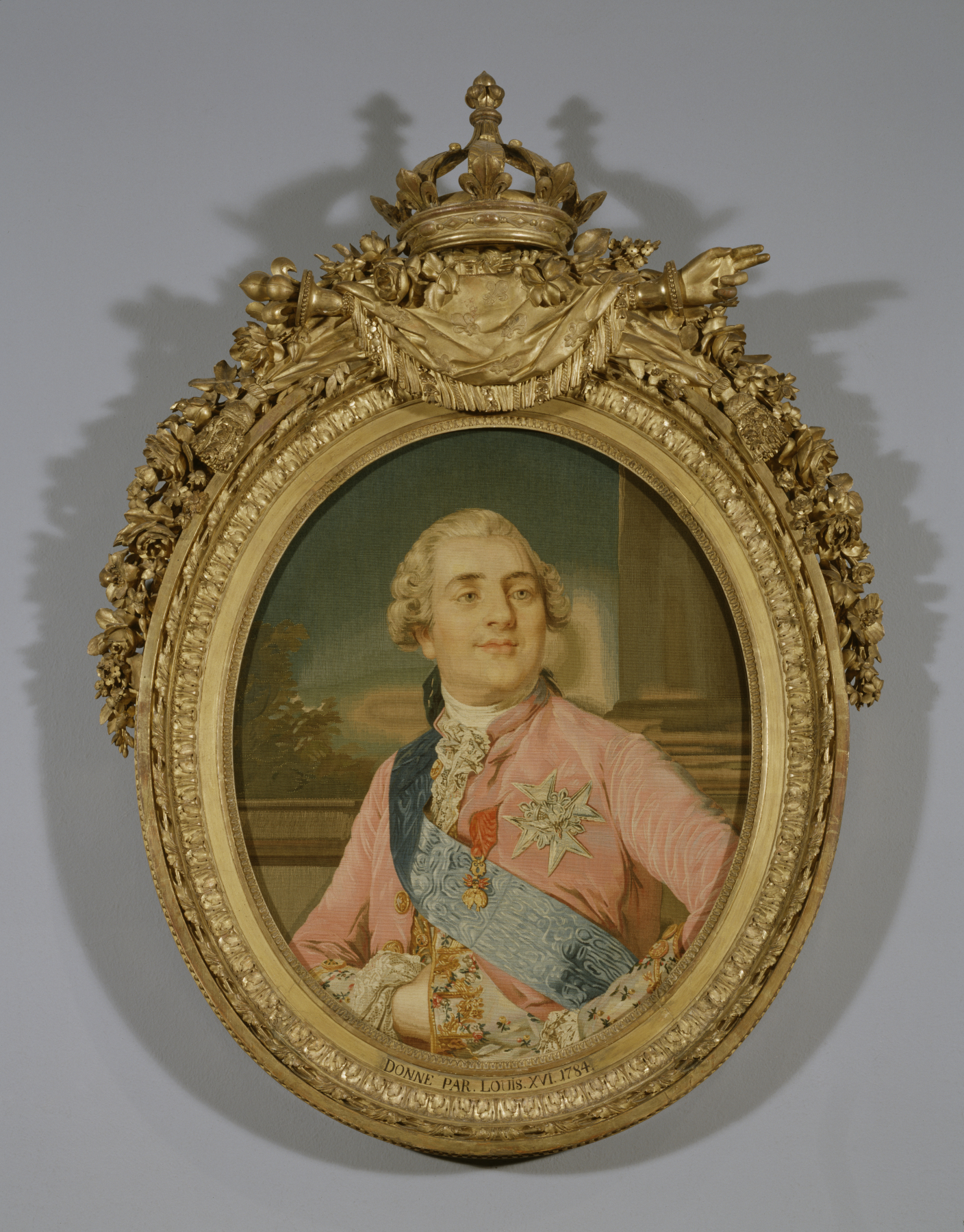
A tapestry portrait of Louis XVI from the Gobelins Manufactory

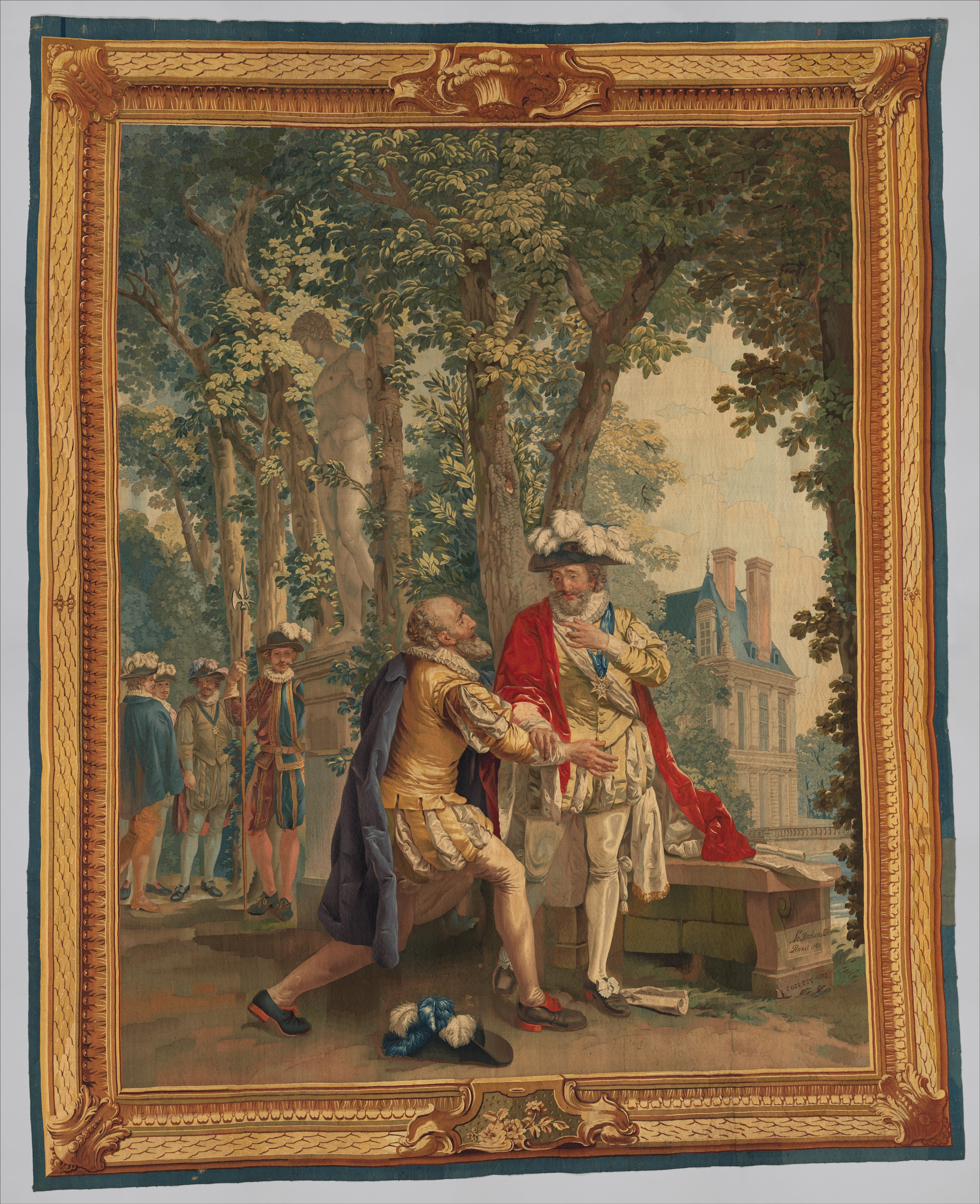
Sully at the feet of Henry IV, Gobelins Manufactory (1788–1792)

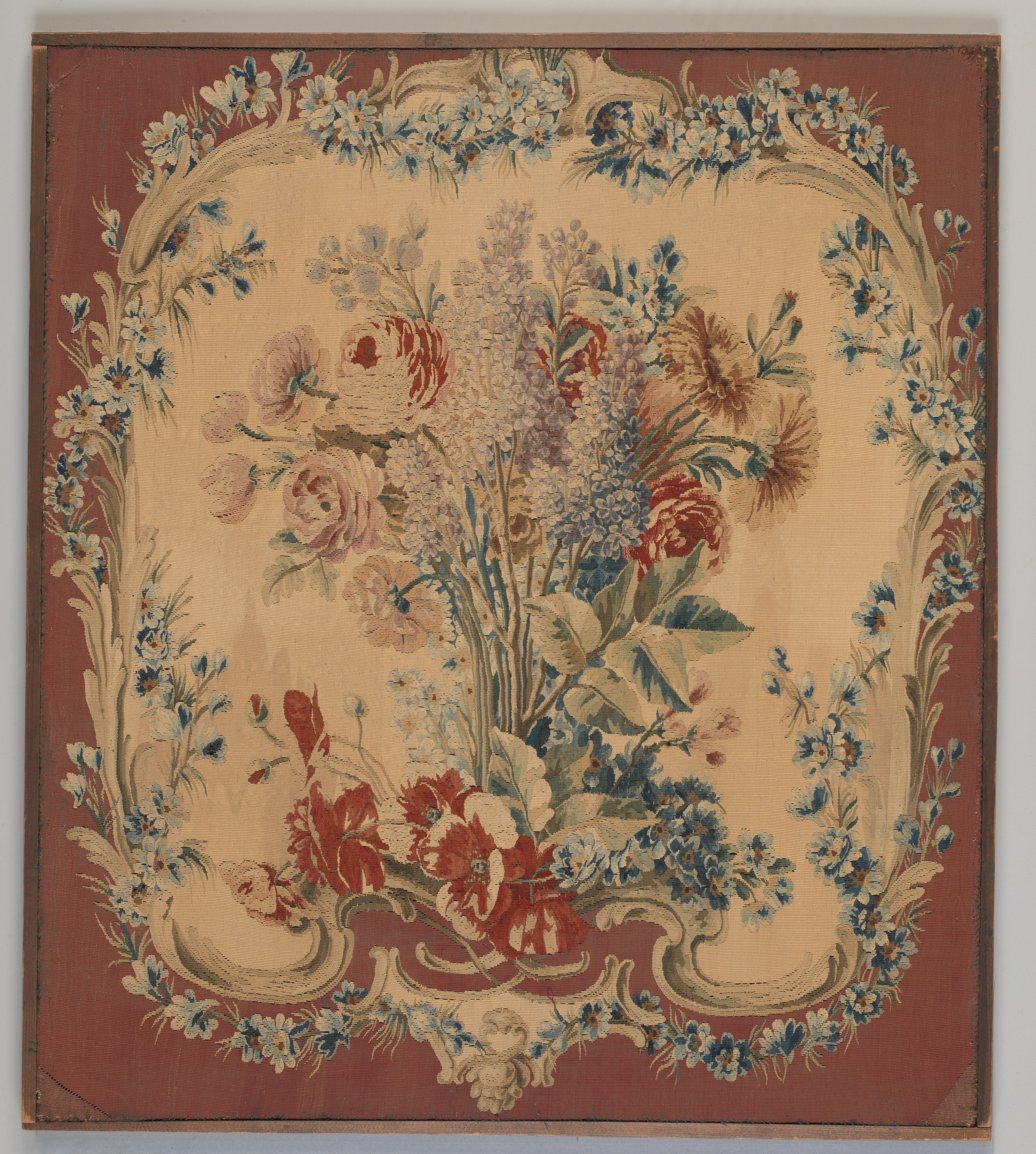
Gobelins upholstery for chair backs (1740–1780)

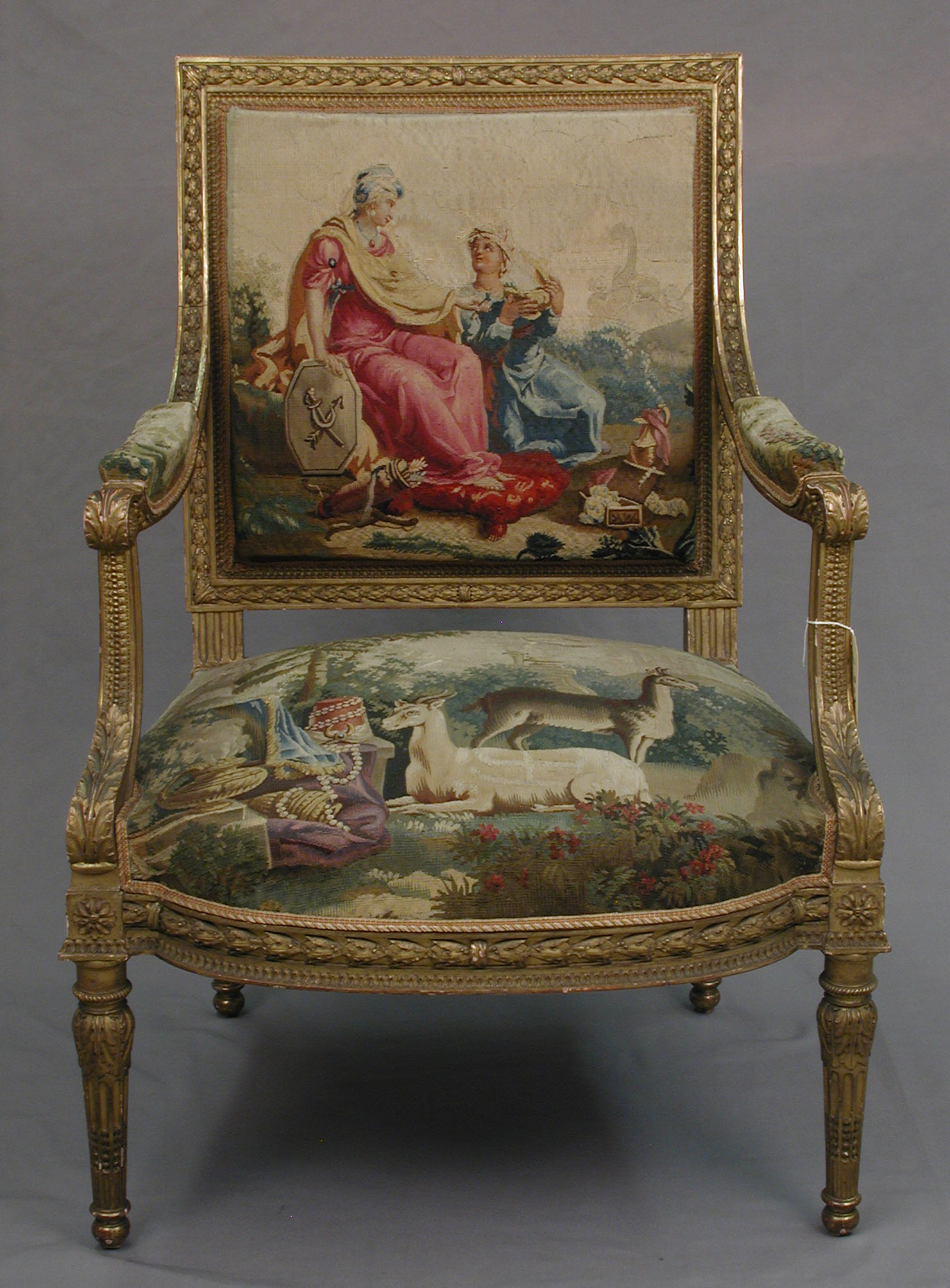
Armchair with Beauvais tapestry (1786–1792)

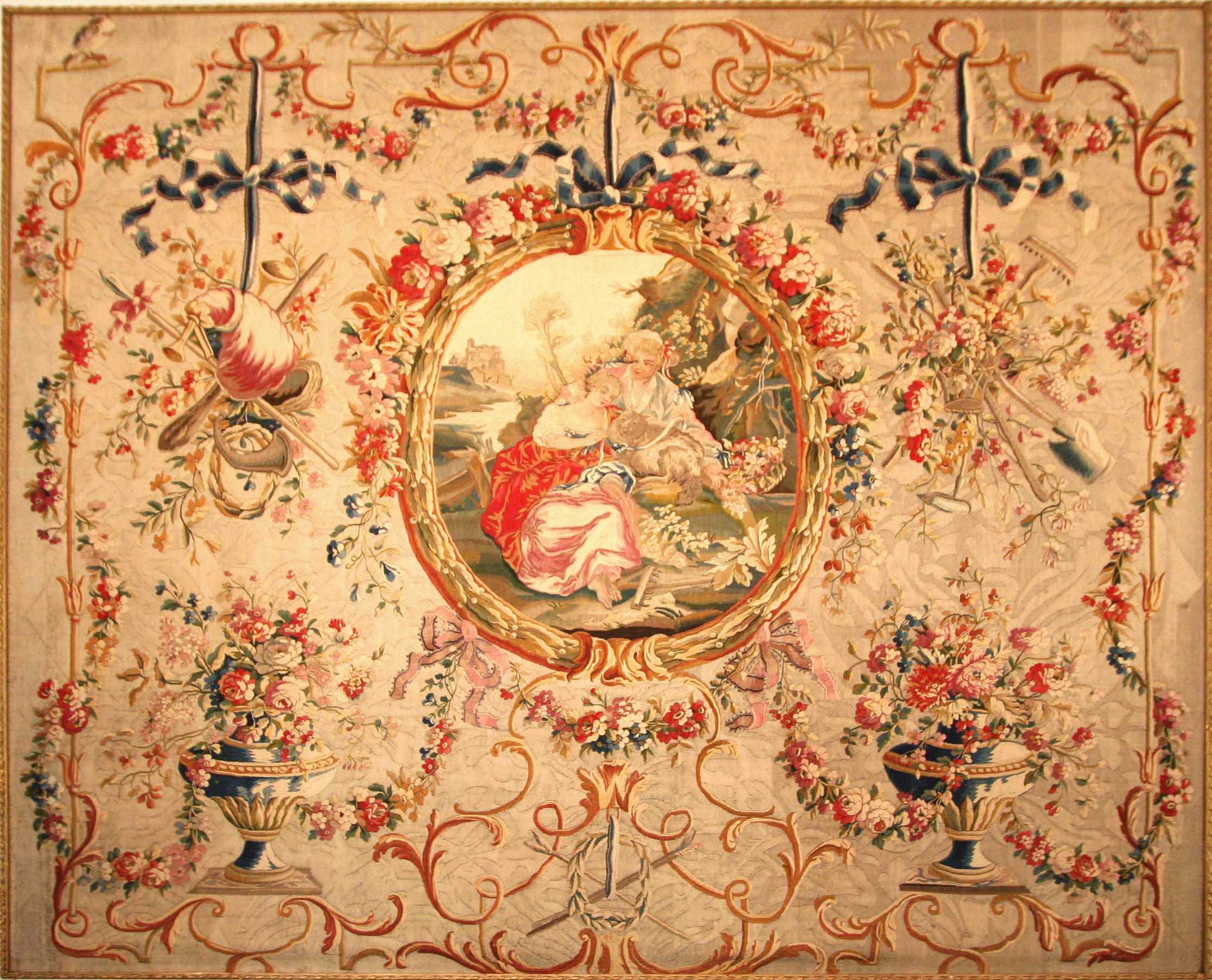
The offering of fidelity, An Aubusson tapestry from a design by Jean-Baptiste Huet (About 1780)

== Wallpaper and printed fabric ==
Hand-painted wallpaper had been used since in the 16th century for interior decoration, followed by wood block prints. French aristocrats often used tapestries in the major rooms, but in the antechambers and lesser rooms they often used painted or printed of painted paper designs imported from China, India, and especially England. In 1765, the French government placed a heavy tax on imported wallpaper, stimulating French production. During the reign of Louis XVI, the largest French enterprise for making wallpaper was created Jean-Baptiste Réveillon. In 1784, they received the title of Royal Manufactory, opened a large depot near the Tuileries Palace, and hired a group of noted artists and illustrators, including the son of the painter Boucher, to design wallpaper. They also soon developed a process for printing the wallpaper in long rolls. He also made the colorful paper that covered the balloon that made the first manned flight in 1783. Their factory in the Faubourg Saint-Antoine became one of the largest in Paris, and was an early target of demonstrations at the beginning of the French Revolution.

Another popular style that developed during the period was the decoration of rooms with panoramic scenes, composed of a number of painted or printed panels put together. These were commonly used in boudoirs and bath chambers. The salon of the pavilion of the Countess of Provence in Montreuil, and the country cottage of Louis Joseph, Prince of Condé at Chantilly had a similar panorama installed in 1775.

Another popular form of decoration was printed fine cotton, with elaborate arabesques and floral patterns. The most famous variety was toile de Jouy. The fabric was made with wood block prints, was usually white and red or blue and red, was used to cover beds, for curtains, and for the covers of furniture. Another important industry was that of the manufacture of silk products. The best quality silk was made in Lyon, and was sold to Catherine the Great of Russia, Frederick the Great of Prussia, and other royal clients. Lampas silk coverings with motifs of arabesques and medallions covered the walls of the billiards room of Marie-Antoinette in 1779, and thereafter became fashionable in Paris residences.

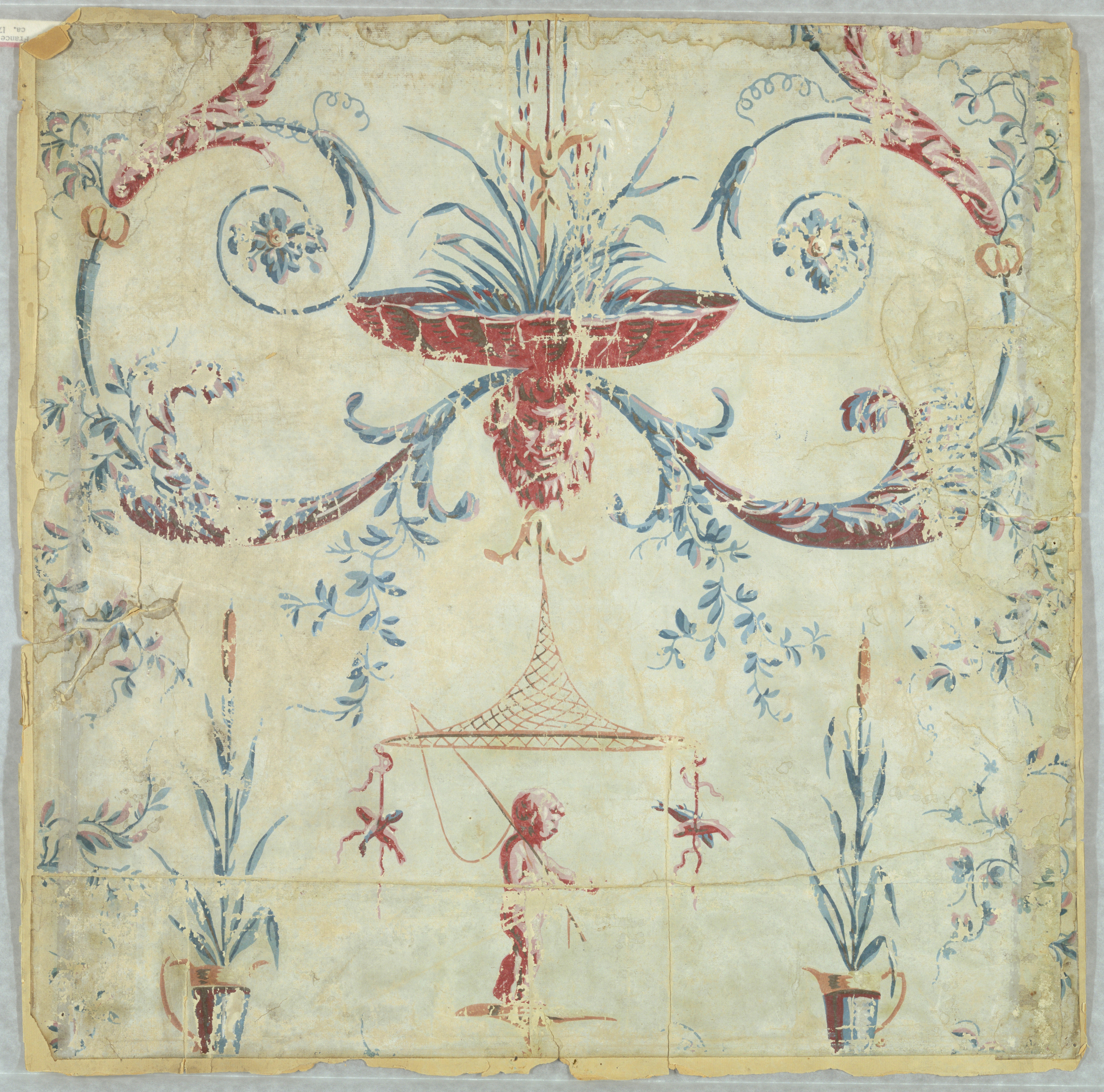
Sidewall pattern (1775)

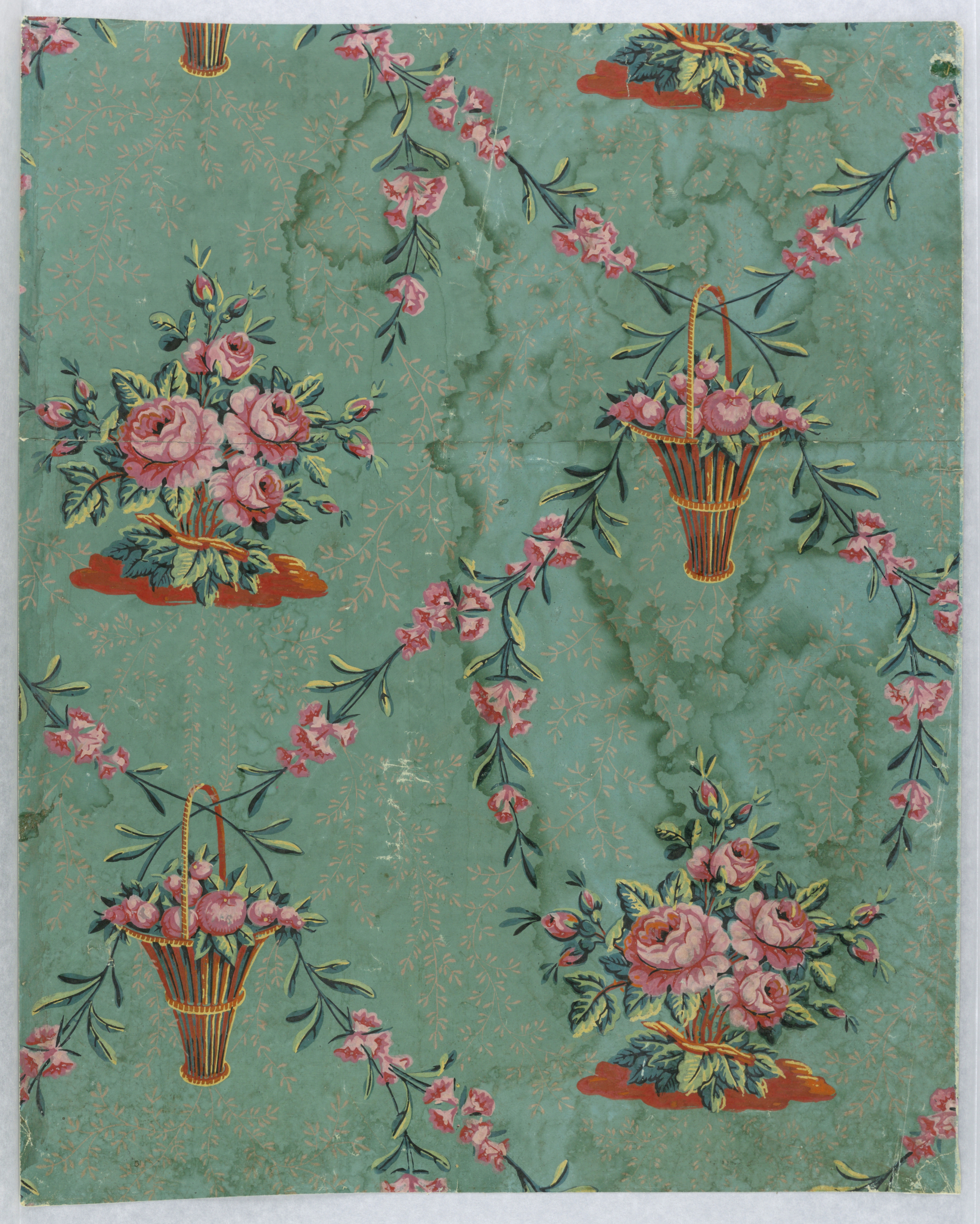
Sidewall pattern wallpaper (1780)

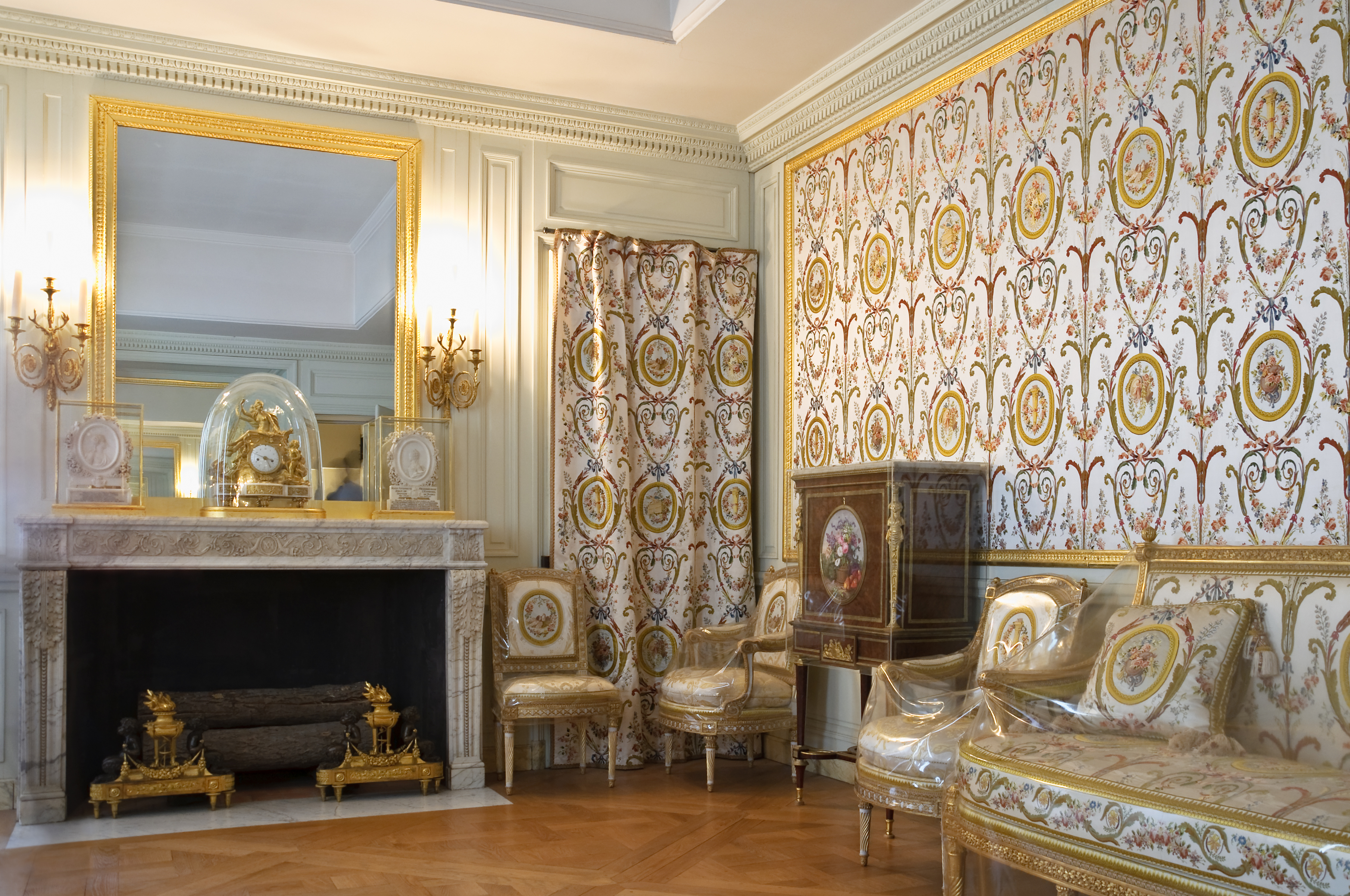
Woven Lampas silk on walls of the billiards at Versailles (1779)

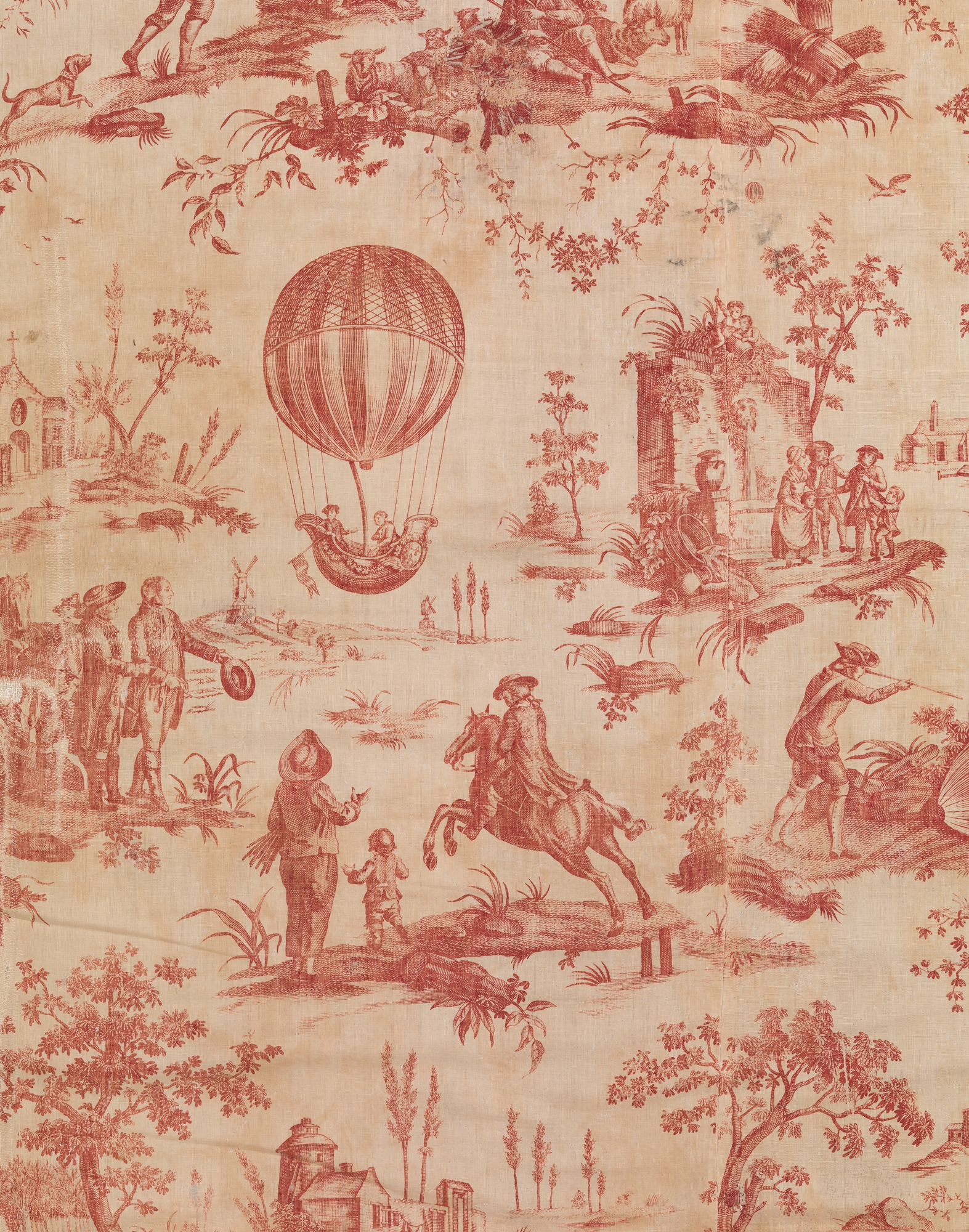
Toile de Jouy printed fabric, with balloon design (1784)

== Painting and sculpture ==
The most famous painter of the later French baroque was François Boucher, who perfectly captured the spirit and style of the period. After his death in 1770, shortly before the beginning of the reign of Louis XVI, he had no real successor in the baroque style. The end of the reign of Louis XV also brought to prominence the first artist to paint in the neoclassical style, Joseph Marie Vien, who painted scenes of Rome inspired by the discoveries at Herculaneum and Pompeii. Vien became the last holder of the title of first painter of the King, which he held from 1789 to 1791. Jean Peyron was another neoclassicist in the early Louis XVI reign. Élisabeth Vigée Le Brun was noted for her portraits of the royal family and nobility, including of Marie Antoinette and her children.

The most prominent neoclassicist by far was Jacques-Louis David, whose works well before the revolution expressed the Roman virtues of noble and grave simplicity. His major early works included Belisarius Begging for Alms (1781), Andromache Mourning Hector (1783), and especially Oath of the Horatii (1784), exalting the willingness of Roman soldiers to give their lives for the nation. The painting was so popular when shown at the Salon of 1785 that David was permitted to establish his studio in the Louvre, a particular honor for artists. This painting became a model of the style that dominated French art during and after the Revolution.

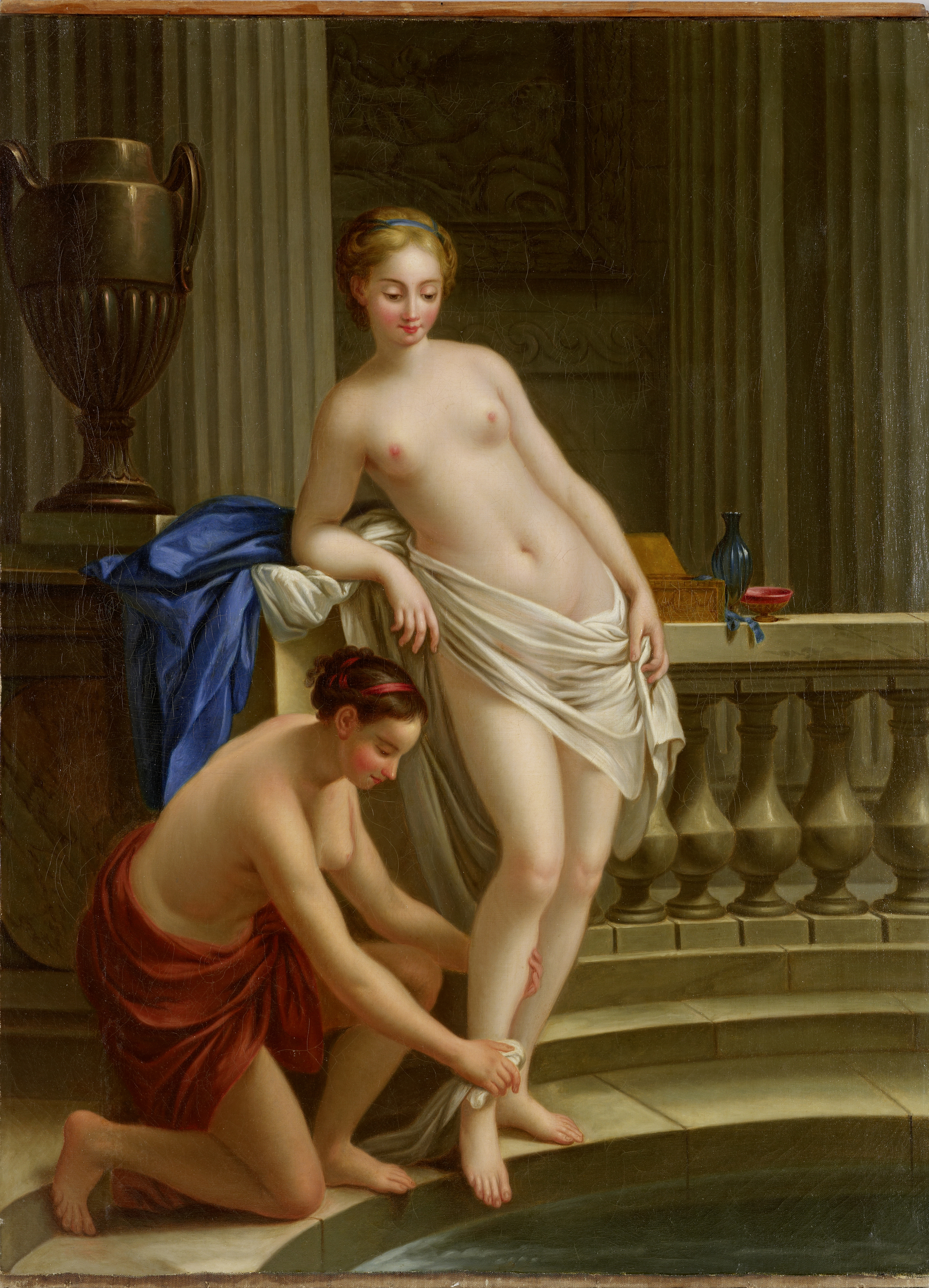
Two Women Bathing by Joseph-Marie Vien (1763) helped launch the wave of neoclassicism

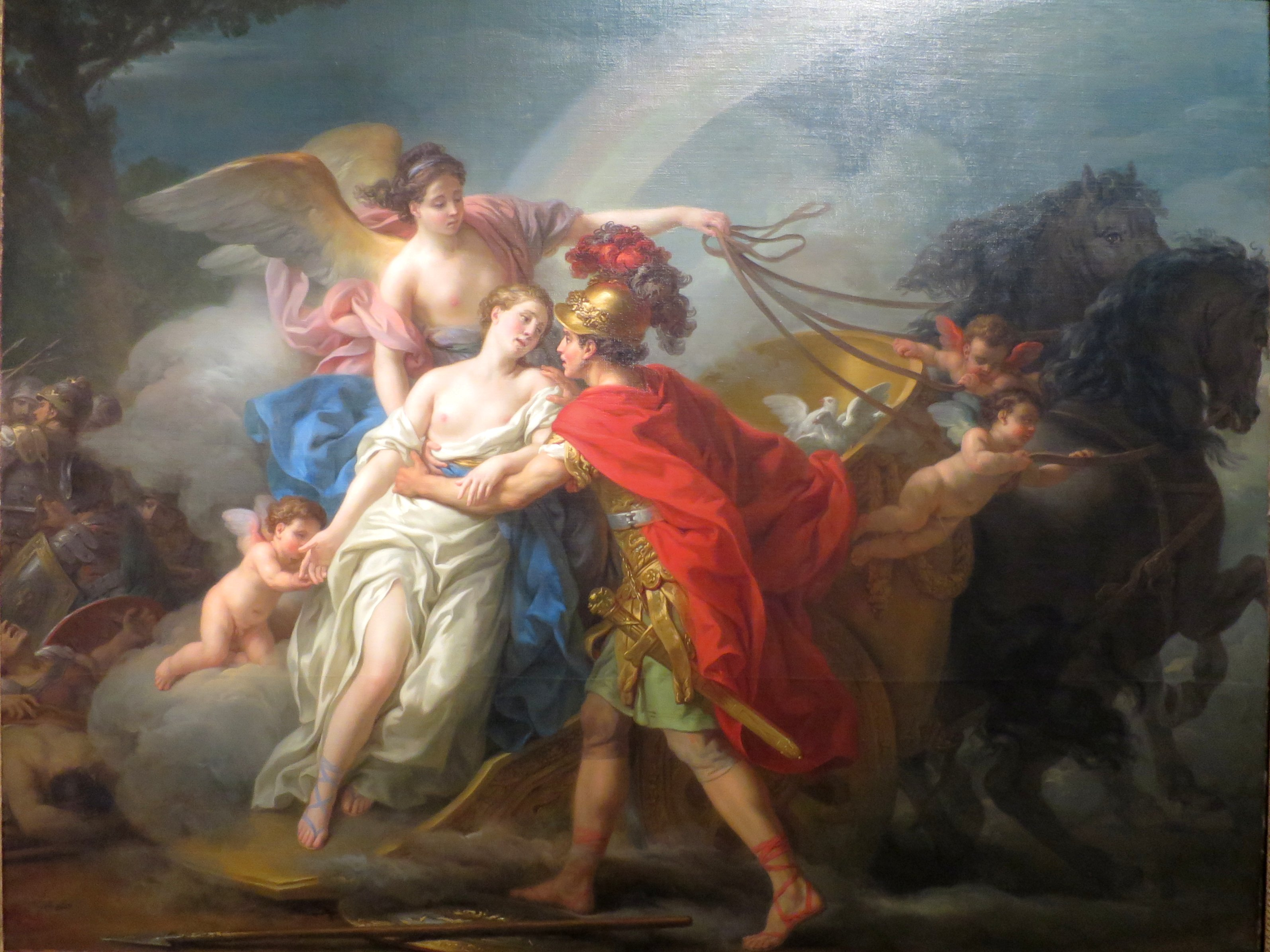
Venus, Wounded by Diomedes, Is Saved by Iris, Joseph-Marie Vien (1775)

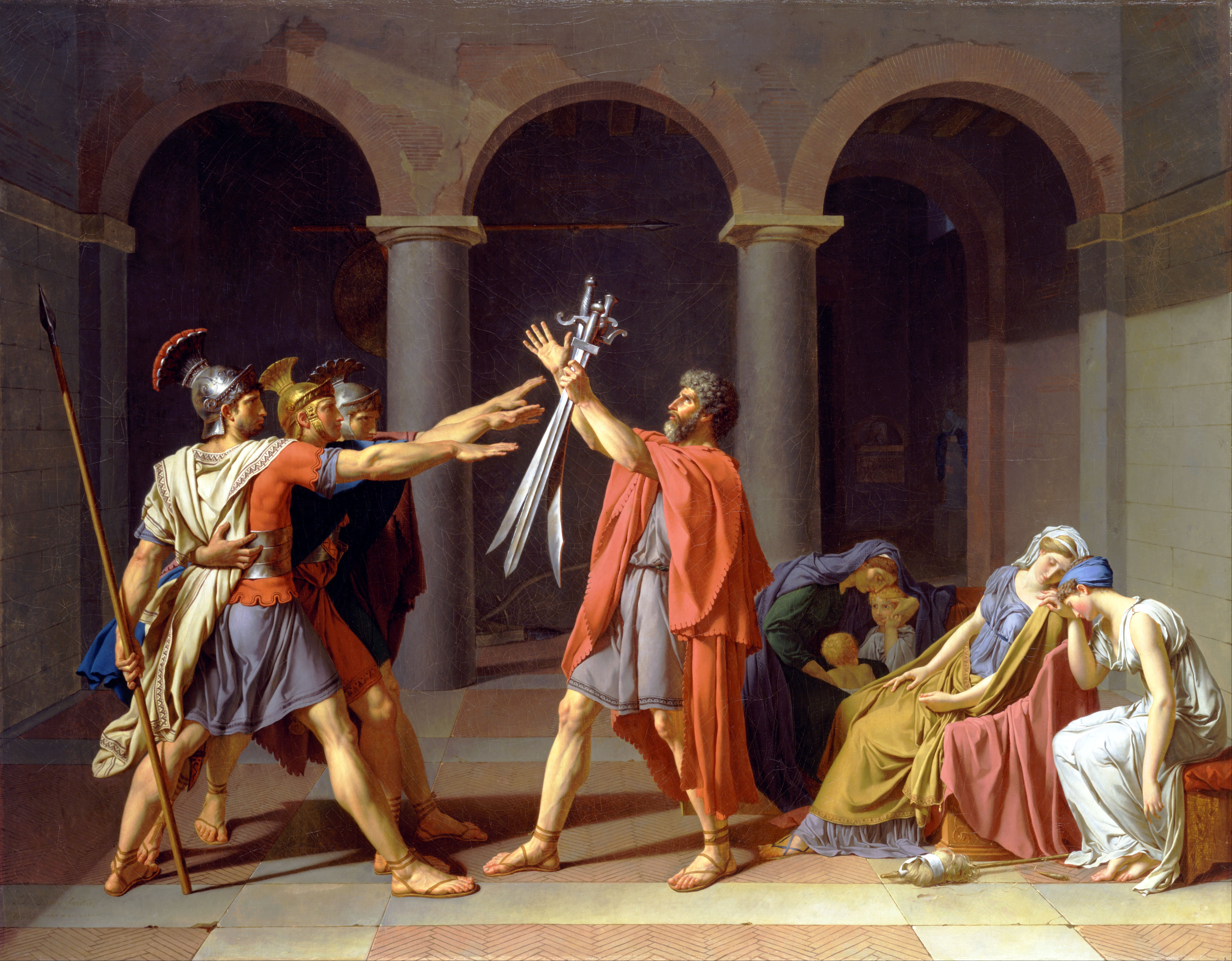
Oath of the Horatii by Jacques-Louis David (1786)

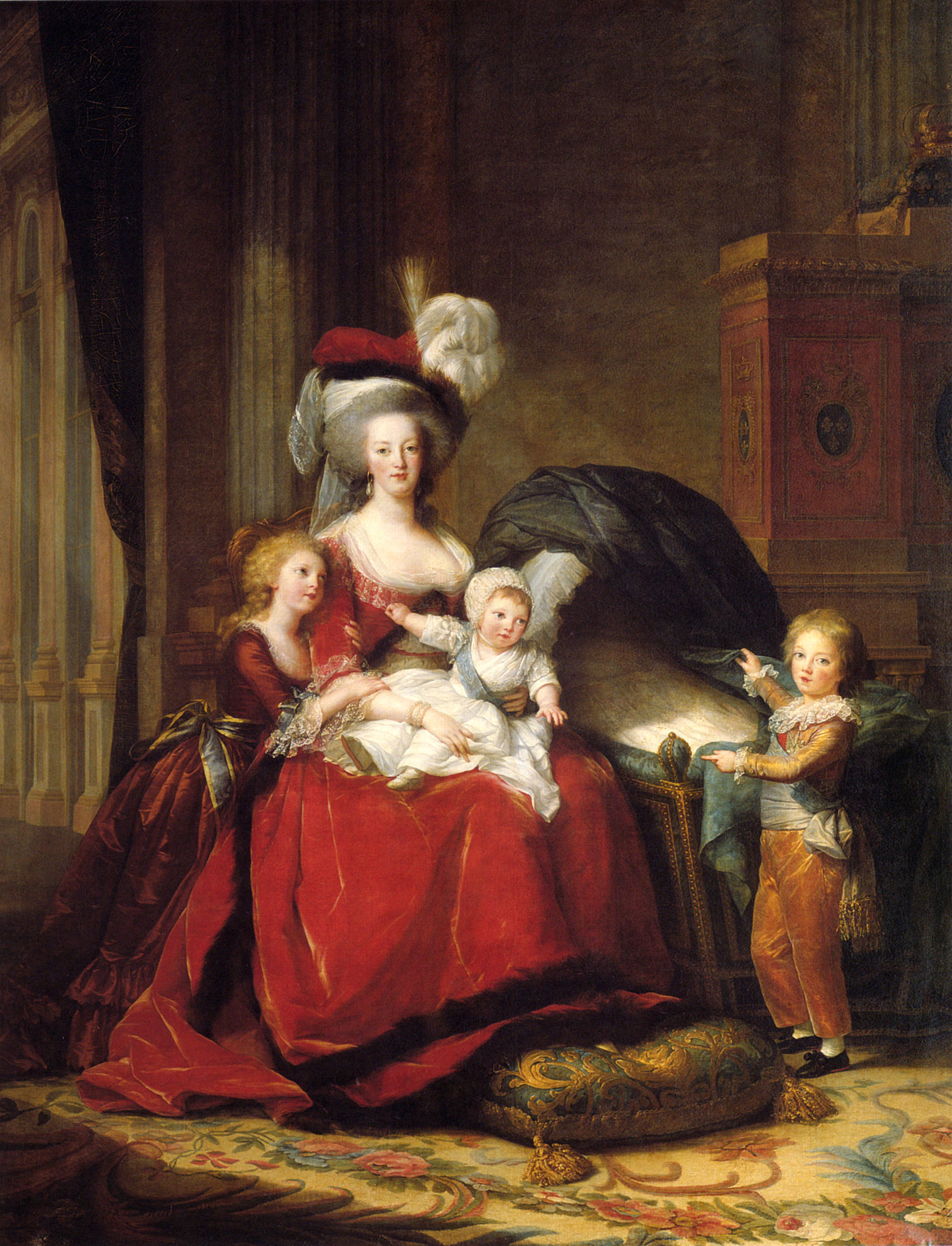
Marie Antoinette and her children by Élisabeth Vigée-Lebrun (1787)

Sculpture evolved from the more animated forms of the Baroque art to the more serene neoclassical style. The sculptors who were most prominent in the period included Étienne Maurice Falconet, who created table sculptures on classical and romantic themes for many Parisian salons, as well as the famous Bronze Horseman, a statue of Peter the Great on horseback for Saint Petersburg. Another notable portrait sculptor was Augustin Pajou, who also made statues of Greek and Roman gods, illustrating virtues; his statue of Mercury represented commerce. The most celebrated portrait sculptor was Jean-Antoine Houdon, known for his busts of leading figures of the period, including, in 1790, in the midst of the Revolution, Louis XVI himself. Louis-Simon Boizot was prominent for making busts of the nobility, including Marie Antoinette, but also for modeling figures for the Sevres porcelain factory, which became better known than his more formal sculpture. Examples include his The Toilet of Madame, made of hard-paste porcelain, mounted on a plaque of marble and gilded bronze.

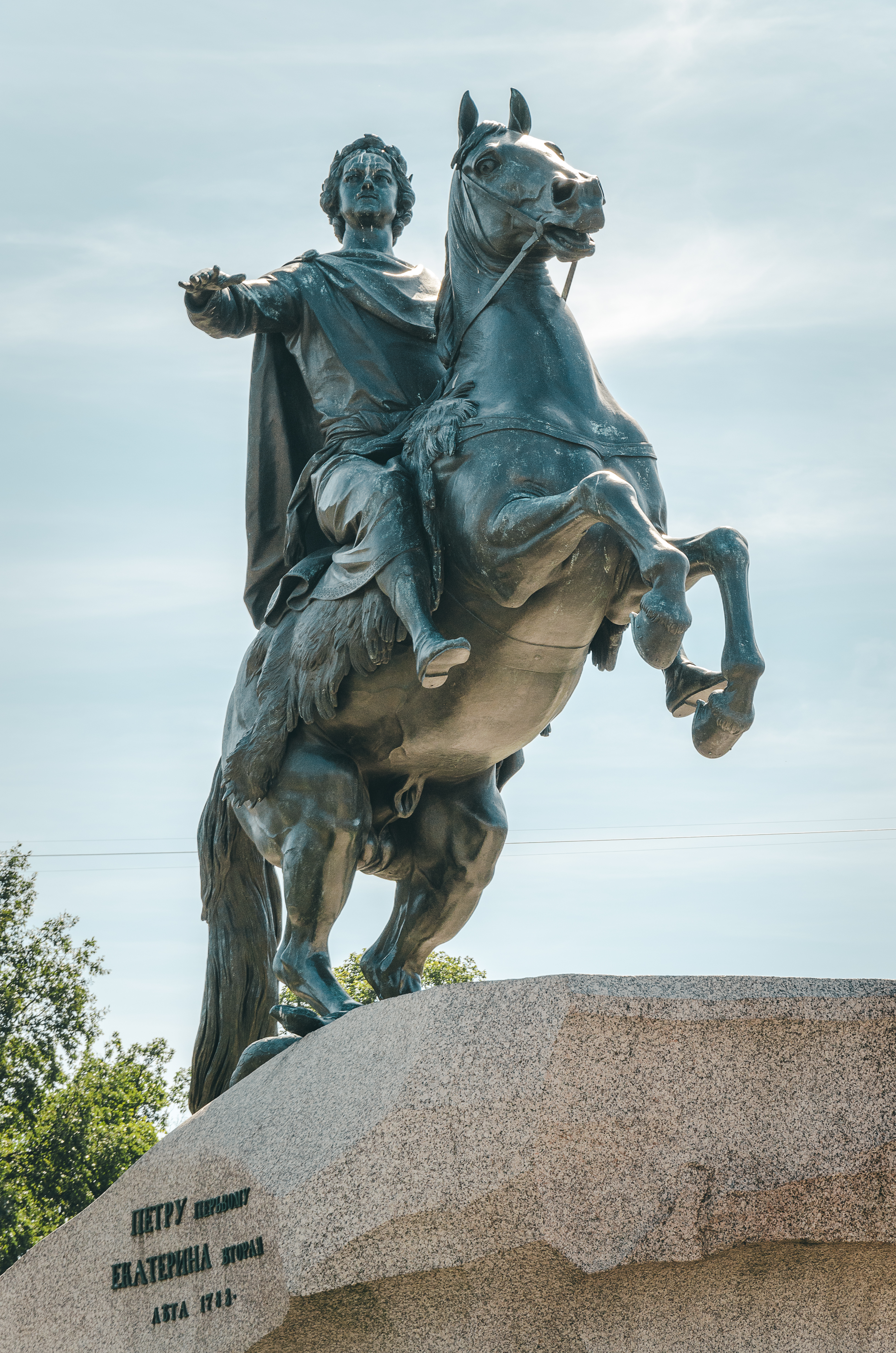
The Bronze Horseman by Étienne Maurice Falconet

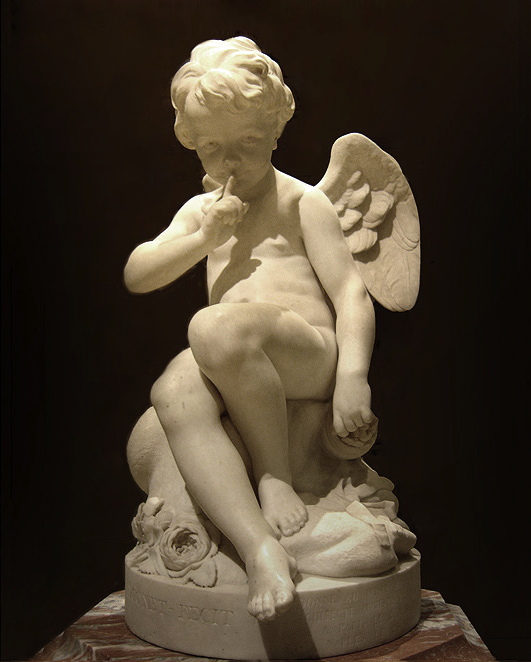
Table sculpture of a cupid by Étienne Maurice Falconet

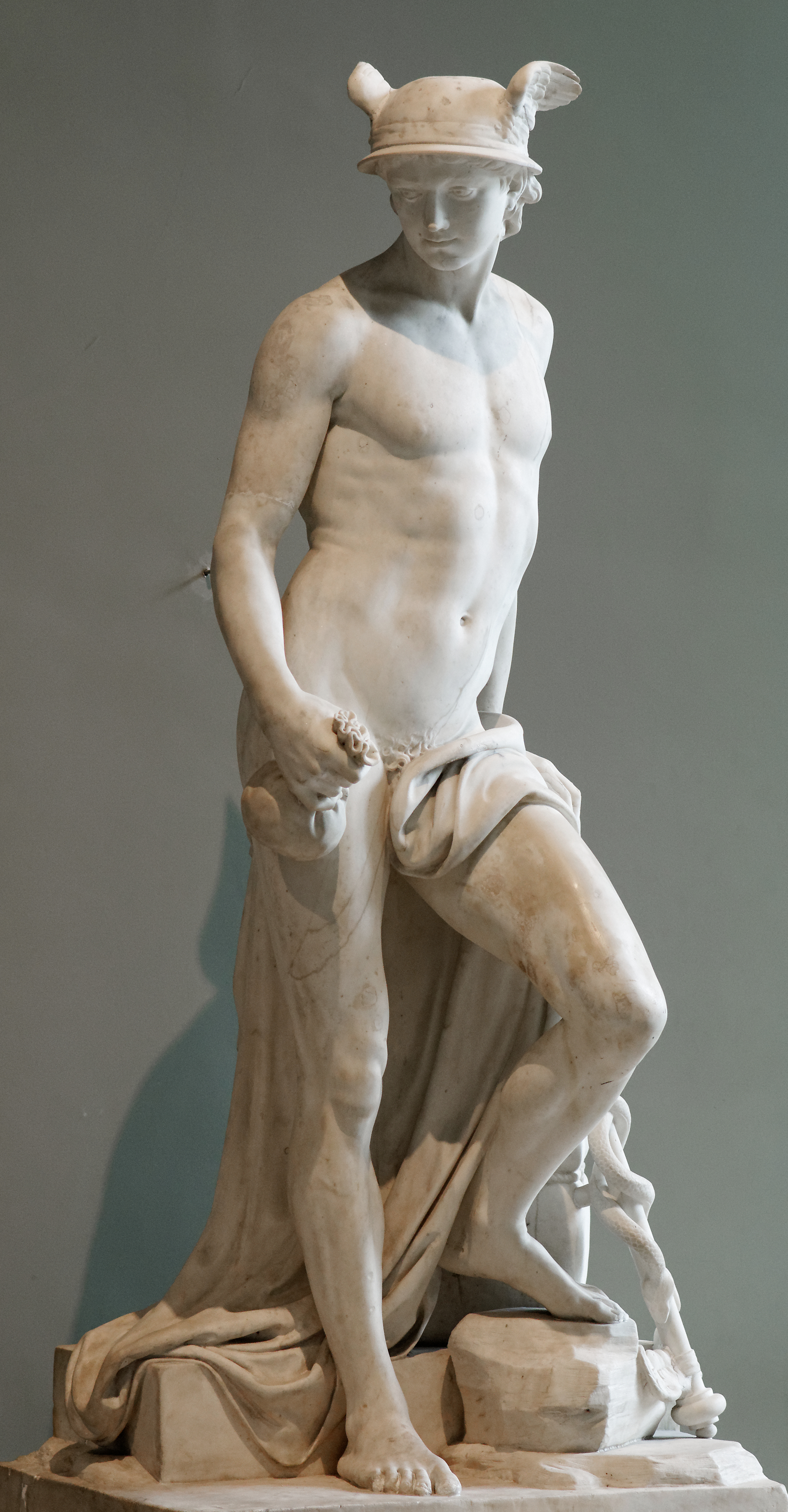
Mercury or Commerce, by Augustin Pajou (1780)

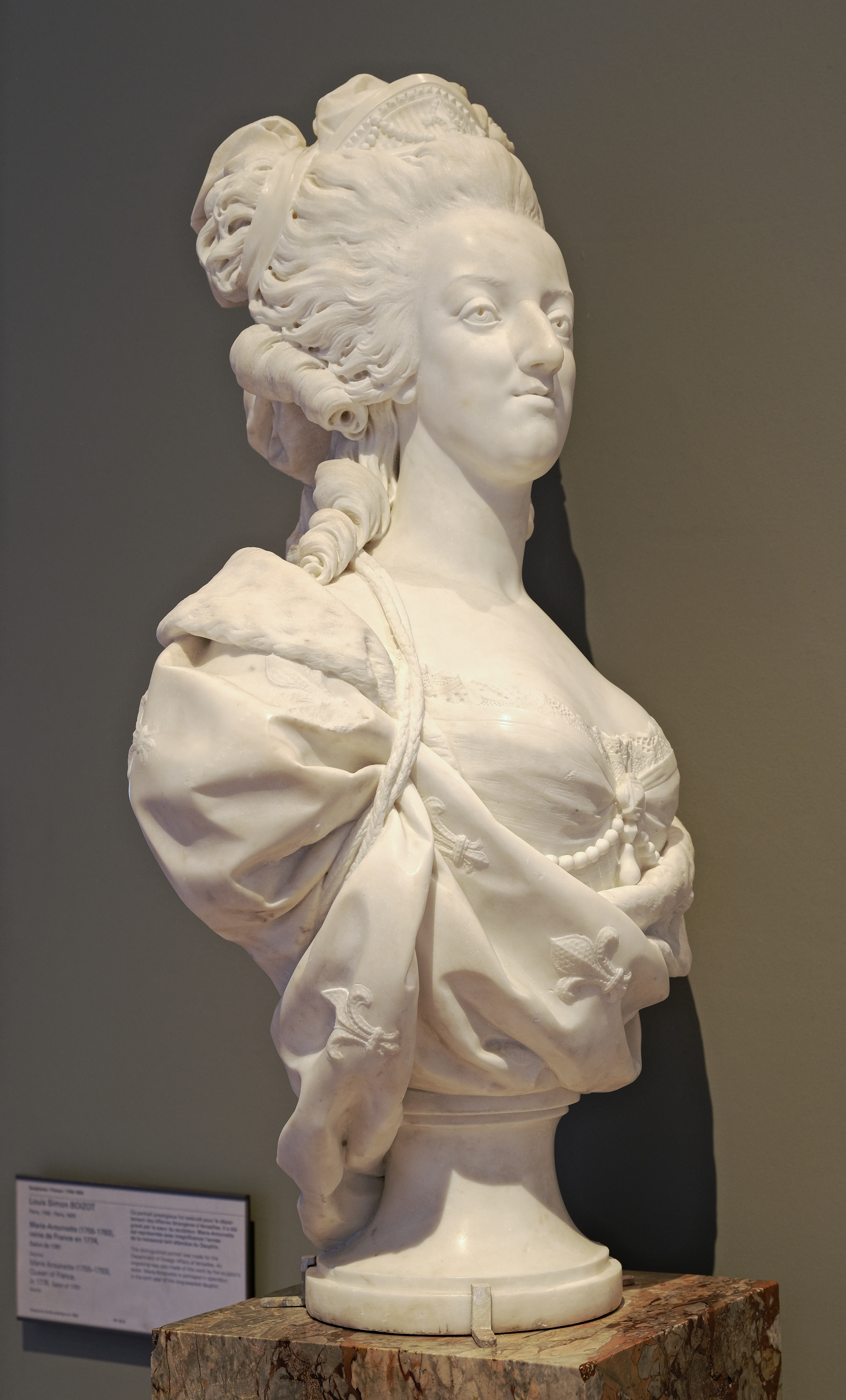
Marie Antoinette, by Louis-Simon Boizot for Salon of 1781

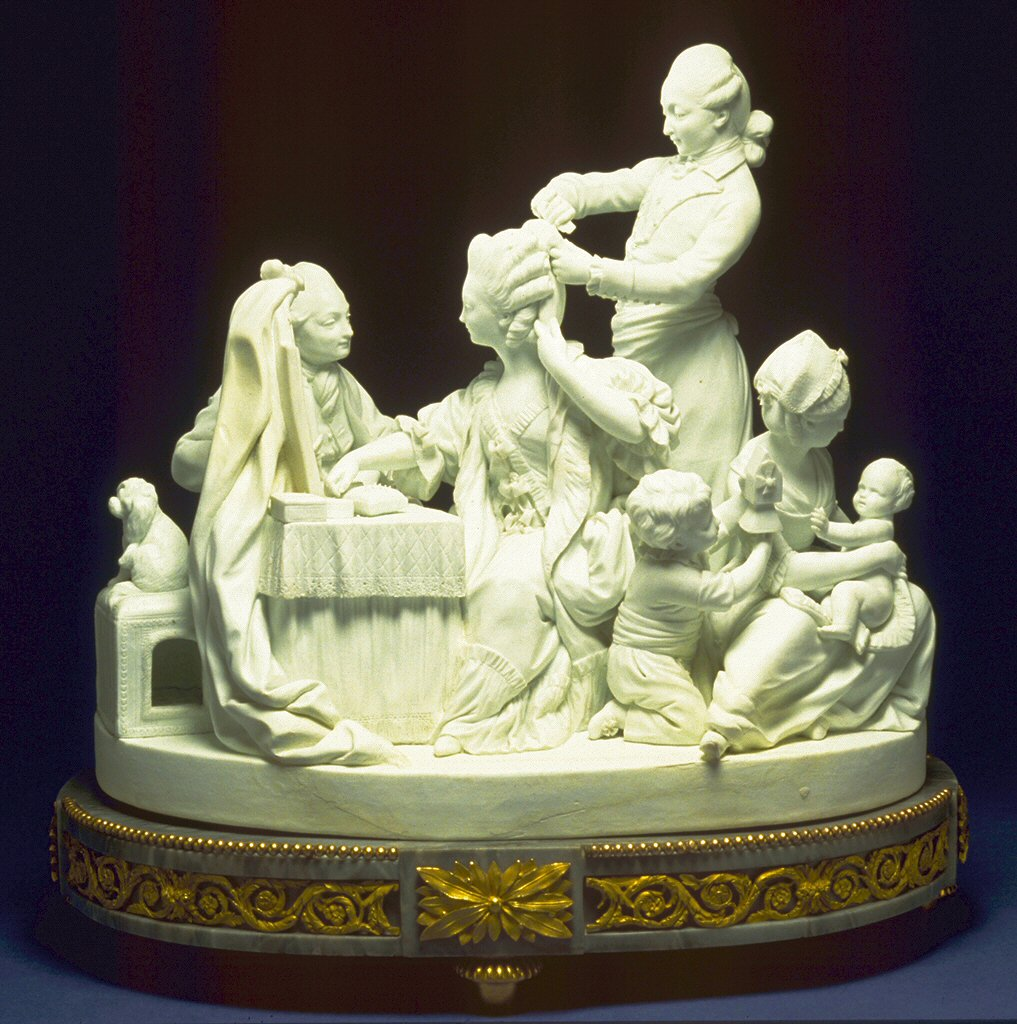
Table centerpiece of Sevres porcelain by Louis-Simon Boizot (1775)

Bust of Voltaire by Jean-Antoine Houdon (1778)

== Music ==
Musical tastes at court were guided by Marie Antoinette. The Queen played the harp and sang, and had been, in Vienna, a student of Christoph Willibald Gluck. Her favorite composers were Gluck and Grétry, and she regularly attended concerts at the Academy of Music and the Concert Sprituel, a society created to support new religious music. Gluck came to Paris in December 1776 for performances of his opera Iphigenie en Tauride, and remained to compose seven more operas. However, his opera, Echo et Narcisse in 1779, was a failure, and he departed Paris, never to return.

Mozart came to Paris in 1778, where he conducted two symphonies including the Paris Symphony, and gave music lessons to members of the nobility, as did Joseph Haydn. The members of the new Masonic movement in Paris were particularly active in sponsoring music; they commissioned Haydn in 1785–86 to write the Symphonies parisiennes all of which premiered in Paris under the direction of Joseph Bologne.

== Revivals ==
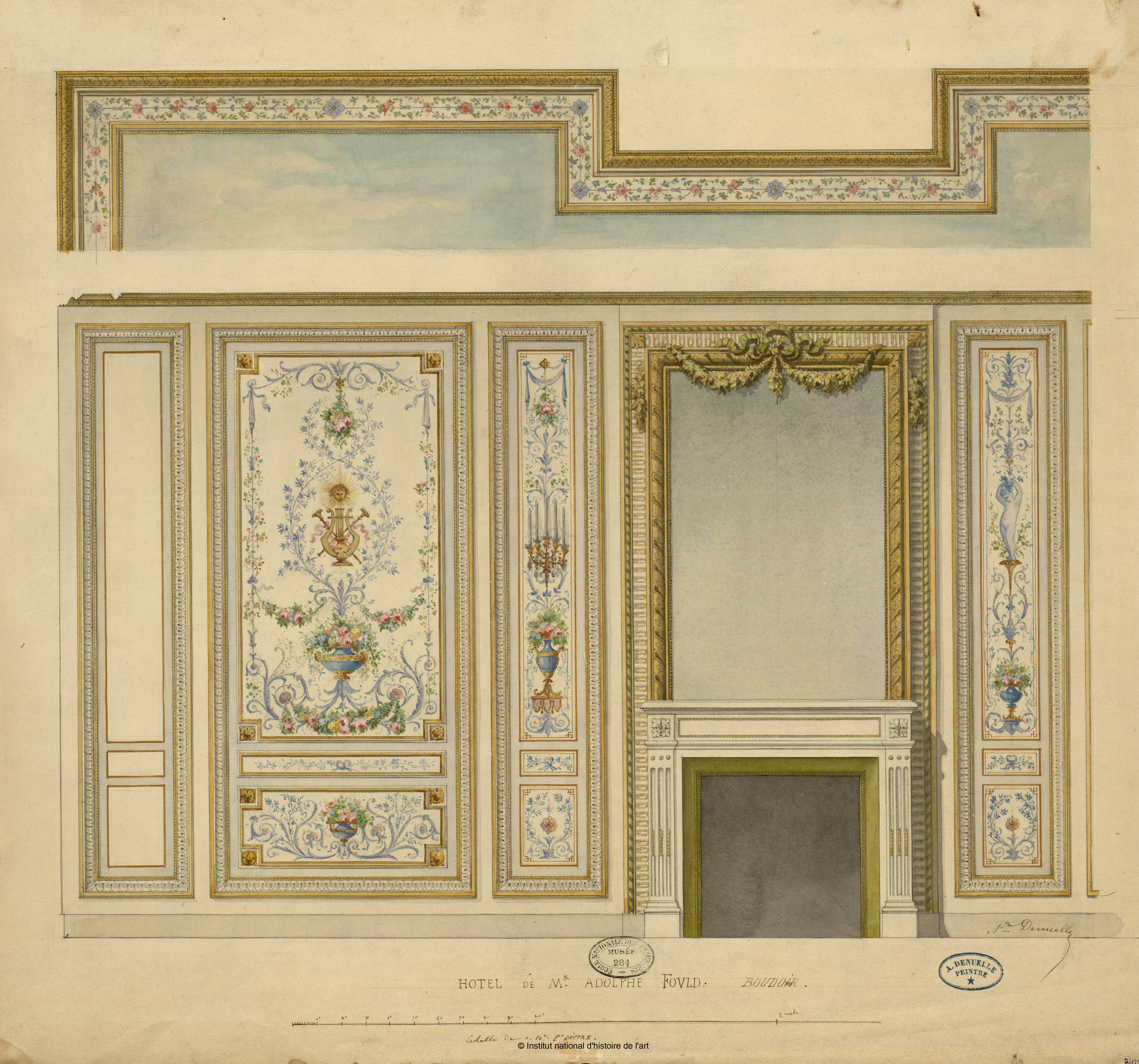
Design for the boudoir of the Hôtel d'Adolphe Fould, Paris, by Alexandre-Dominique Denuelle, 19th century

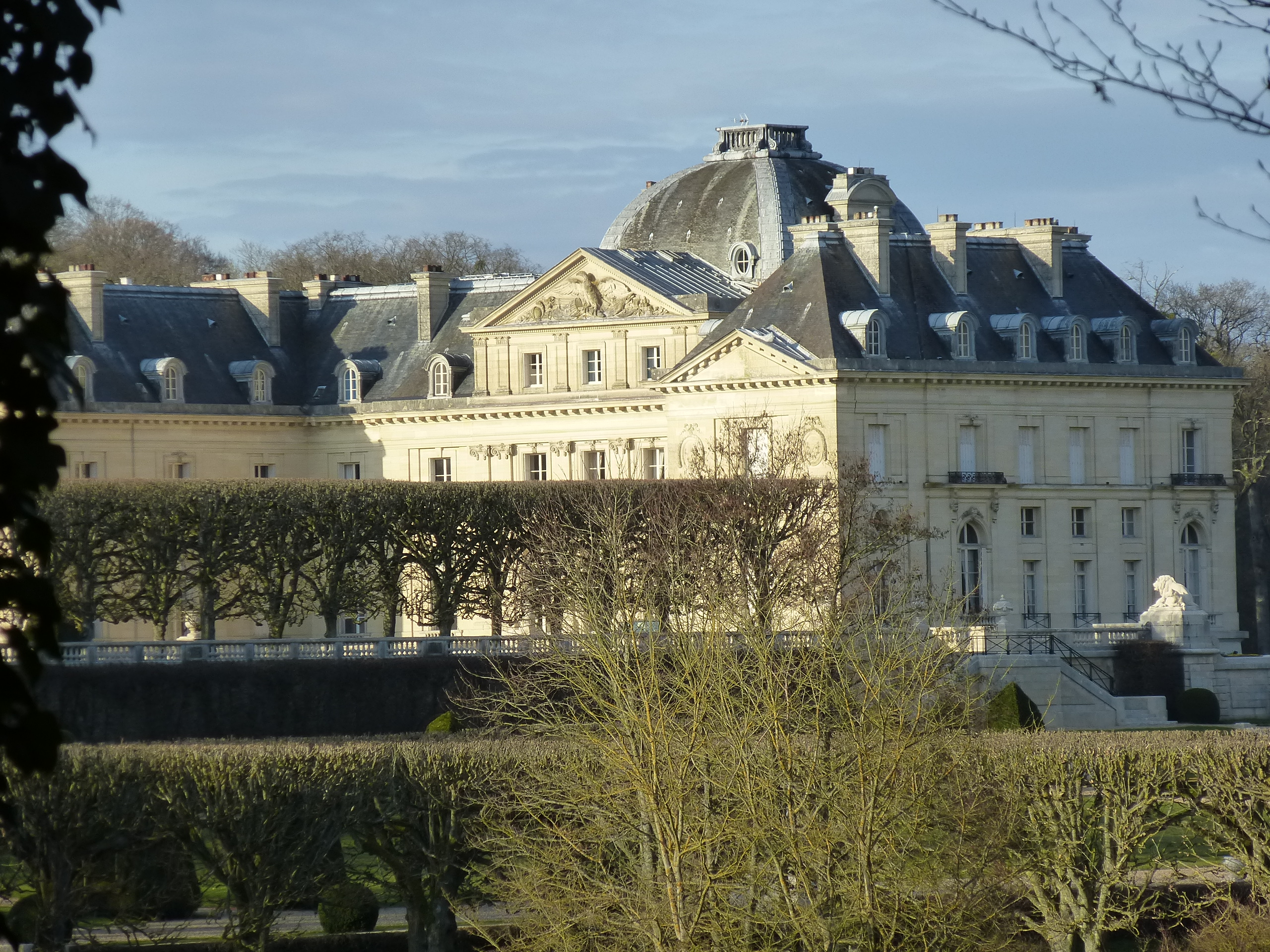
Château de Voisins, Saint-Hilarion, France, by René Sergent (1903–1906)

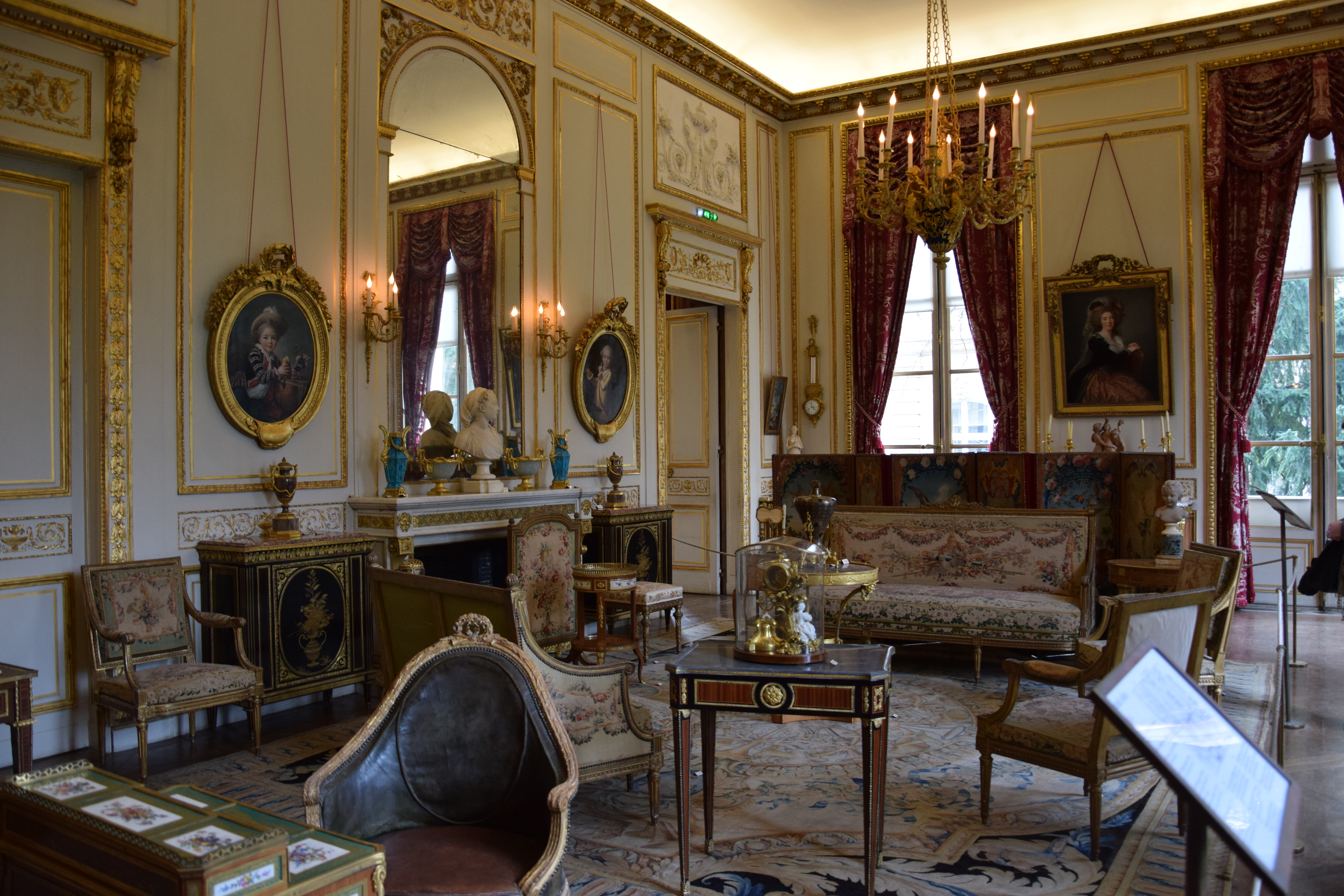
Grand salon of the Musée Nissim de Camondo, Paris, by René Sergent (1910–1913)

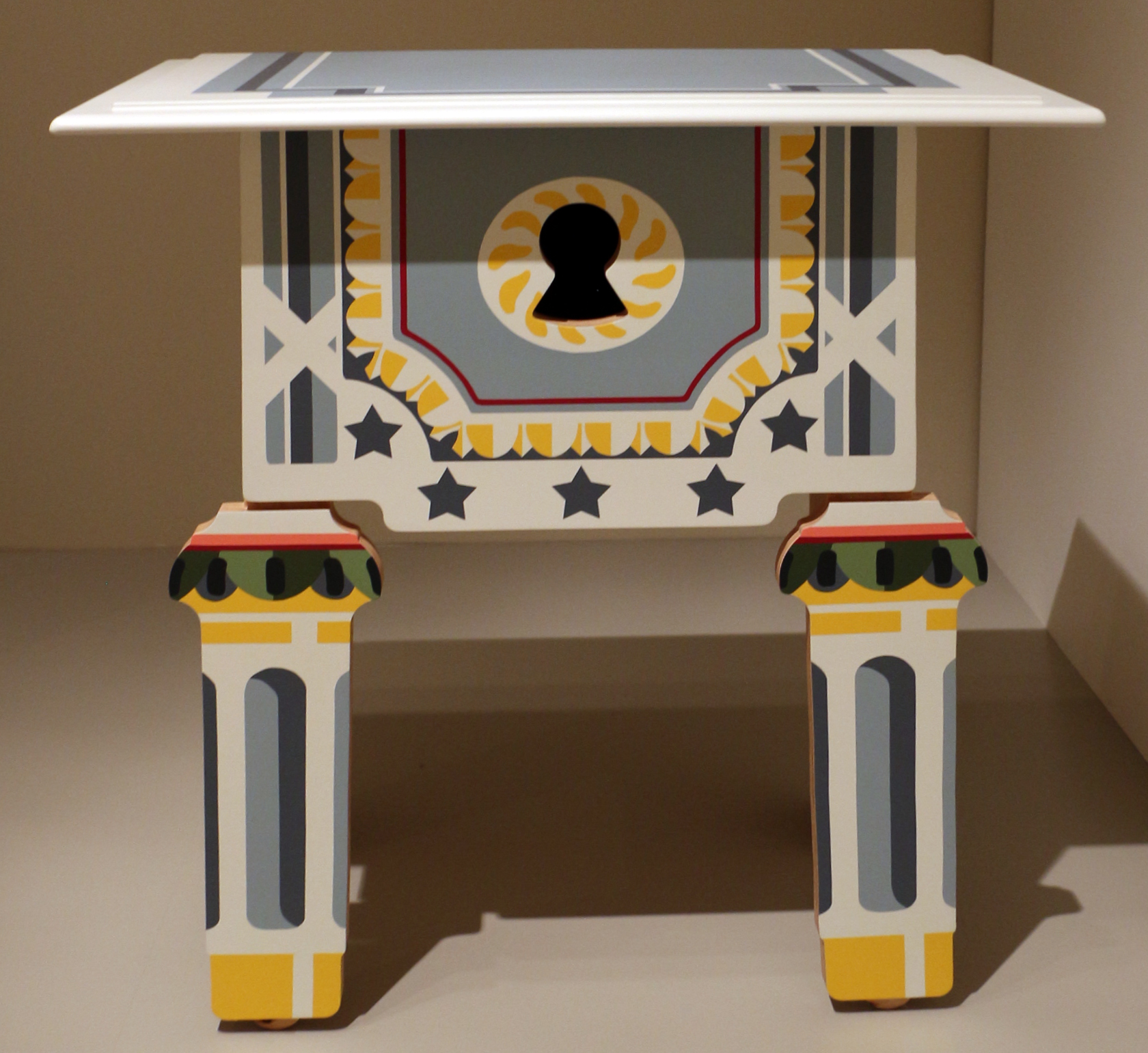
Postmodern Louis XVI lowboy by Robert Venturi for Arc International (c.1985), Indianapolis Museum of Art, Indianapolis, USA

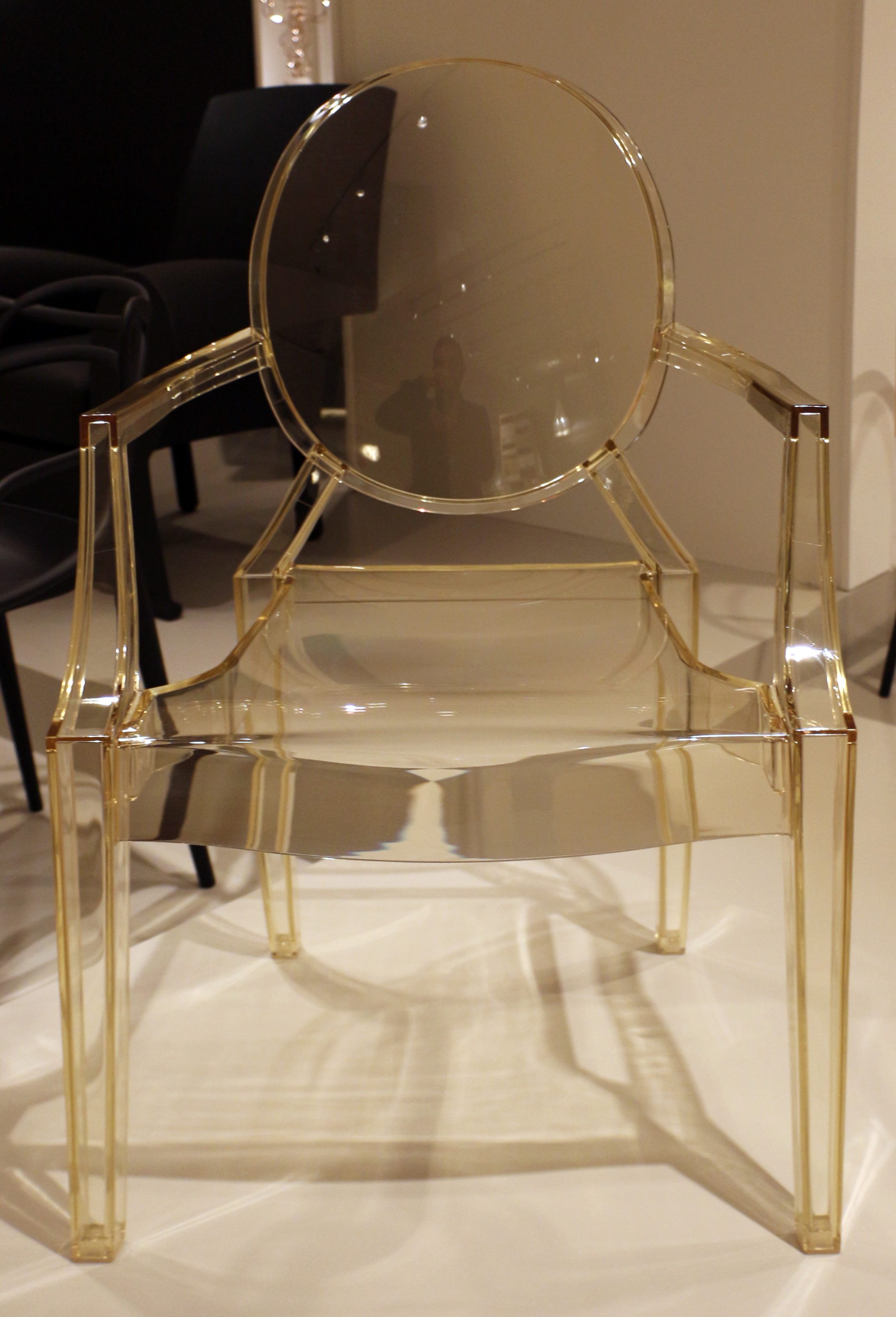
Louis Ghost by Philippe Starck (2009), various locations

== See also ==
- Louis period styles
- Directoire style
- Empire style
- Liège–Aachen Baroque furniture
- Baroque in Prince-Bishopric of Liège

== Bibliography ==
- Droguet, Anne (2004). Les Styles Transition et Louis XVI. Les Editions de l'Amateur. ISBN 2-85917-406-0.
- Cabanne, Perre (1988). L'Art Classique et le Baroque. Paris, France: Larousse. ISBN 978-2-03-583324-2.
- Ducher, Robert (1988). Caractéristique des Styles. Paris, France: Flammarion. ISBN 2-08-011539-1.
- Fierro, Alfred (1996). Histoire et dictionnaire de Paris. Robert Laffont. ISBN 2-221-07862-4.
- Prina, Francesca; Demartini, Elena (2006). Petite encylopédie de l'architecture. Paris, France: Solar. ISBN 2-263-04096-X.
- Hopkins, Owen (2014). Les styles en architecture. Dunod. ISBN 978-2-10-070689-1.
- Renault, Christophe (2006). Les Styles de l'architecture et du mobilier. Paris, France: Gisserot. ISBN 978-2-877-4746-58.
- Texier, Simon (2012). Paris- Panorama de l'architecture de l'Antiquité à nos jours. Paris, France: Parigramme. ISBN 978-2-84096-667-8.
- Dictionnaire Historique de Paris. Le Livre de Poche. 2013. ISBN 978-2-253-13140-3.
- Vila, Marie Christine (2006). Paris Musique- Huit Siècles d'histoire. Paris, France: Parigramme. ISBN 978-2-84096-419-3.
