= List of wallpaper manufacturers =

Wallpaper is a material used in interior decoration to decorate the interior walls of domestic and public buildings. Historically, wallpaper has been manufactured by both individual printmakers and companies. This list includes both, arranged by country of origin.

== France ==
- Defossé & Karth
- Jacquemart & Bérnard
- Jean-Baptiste Réveillon
- Joseph Dufour et Cie
- Jourdan et Villard
- Paul Balin
- Zuber & Cie

== Germany ==
- Marburger Tapetenfabrik

== United Kingdom ==
- Arthur Sanderson & Sons
- Coloroll
- Crown Wallpaper
- de Gournay
- Hammer Prints Limited
- Jeffrey & Co
- Morris & Co.
- Walker Greenbank

== United States ==
- Adrian Janes
- Lightbown Aspinall
- Osborne & Little
- Robert Graves Company
