= Crown Wallpaper =

Crown Wallpaper, also known as the Crown Wallpaper Company, was an agglomeration of some of the largest wallpaper manufacturers in the United Kingdom in 1899.

== Overview ==
The agglomeration included founding member Arthur Sanderson & Sons. By 1904, the group had acquired the majority of companies specialising in relief decoration, which included Lincrusta-Walton and Anaglypta.

The company had premises in Darwen, Lancashire. The company eventually transformed to become Crown Ltd. In 1985 Borden Inc. purchased the business from Reed International, with the business holding 18% of the market, with a further 3% added when Borden purchased the decorating operations of T & N in 1988 for £12 million.

== Archive ==
The Crown Wallpaper Archive, comprising 5,000 wallpaper samples and pattern books from the early 1950s to the late 1960s, is held at the Museum of Domestic Design and Architecture.

== See also ==
- Defossé & Karth
- Jacquemart & Bérnard
