= Réveillon (disambiguation) =

Réveillon may refer to:

- Réveillon, a long dinner, and possibly party, held on the evenings preceding Christmas Day and New Year's Day, in Brazil, in Portugal, in France and some other French-speaking countries

Réveillon is the name of two communes in France:

- Réveillon, Marne, in the Marne département
- Réveillon, Orne, in the Orne département

Réveillon is the name of two rivers in France:

- Réveillon (Yerres), tributary of the Yerres, crossing the Seine-et-Marne and the Val-de-Marne departments
- Réveillon (Epte), tributary of the Epte, crossing the Oise and the Eure departments

Réveillon is a surname:

- Jean-Baptiste Réveillon
  - Réveillon riots

Réveillon is also:

- Le Réveillon, a play by Henri Meilhac and Ludovic Halévy which became the basis for Die Fledermaus
