= French Guards Regiment =

Gardes Françaises
- Regimental flag of the Gardes françaises
- Active: 1563–1789
- Country: France
- Branch: Army
- Type: Guard Infantry
- Role: Infantry

The French Guards (French: Régiment des Gardes françaises, pronounced [ʁeʒimɑ̃ de ɡaʁd fʁɑ̃sɛːz]) were an elite infantry regiment of the French Royal Army. They formed a constituent part of the maison militaire du roi de France ("military household of the king of France") under the Ancien Régime.

The French Guards, who were located in Paris, played a major part in the French Revolution as most of the guardsmen defected to the revolutionary cause and ensured the collapse of absolute monarchy in France. French Guards led the Storming of the Bastille and formed the cadre for the National Guard.

== History ==
The regiment was created in 1563 by Charles IX. It was composed of 9,000 men in 30 companies in 1635 with 300 fusiliers per company. They were armed with a form of musket ("fusils") or steel-handled pikes, and were allowed to conduct a normal civilian life in times of peace. In practice this meant that they could undertake civilian employment when not required on duty.

At Catherine de' Medici's insistence, they were at first spread over several garrisons, but after the attempted kidnapping of King Charles IX near Meaux by Huguenots, the Gardes were brought back together specifically to protect the monarch.

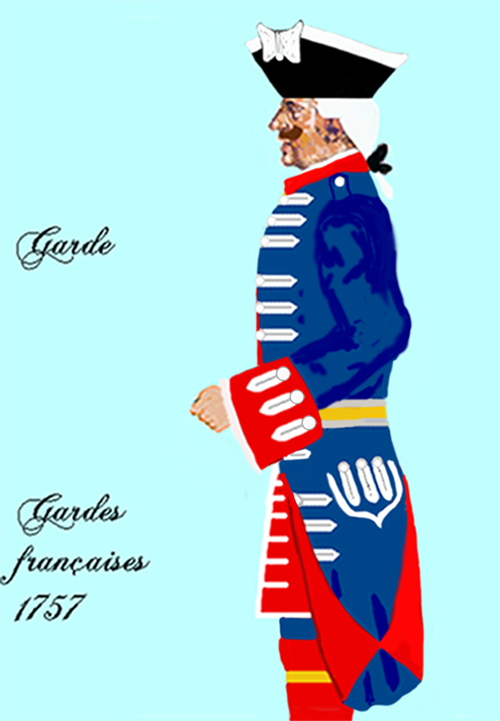
Uniform of the Gardes françaises (1757)

=== Privileges, role and organisation ===
In times of war the Gardes Françaises had the privilege of choosing their own battle positions (usually in the centre of the first line of infantry). Other privileges included leading the assault when a wall was breached during a siege, the first choice of barracks and special rights of trial. When on parade, they took precedence over all other regiments in the Royal Army.

They shared responsibility for guarding the exterior of the Palace of Versailles with the Gardes Suisses. In addition, the French Guards had responsibility for maintaining public order in Paris, in support of the various police forces of the capital.

In 1764, the Gardes Françaises was reorganized to have six battalions, with five fusilier companies (each 120 men) and one grenadier half-company of 50 men.

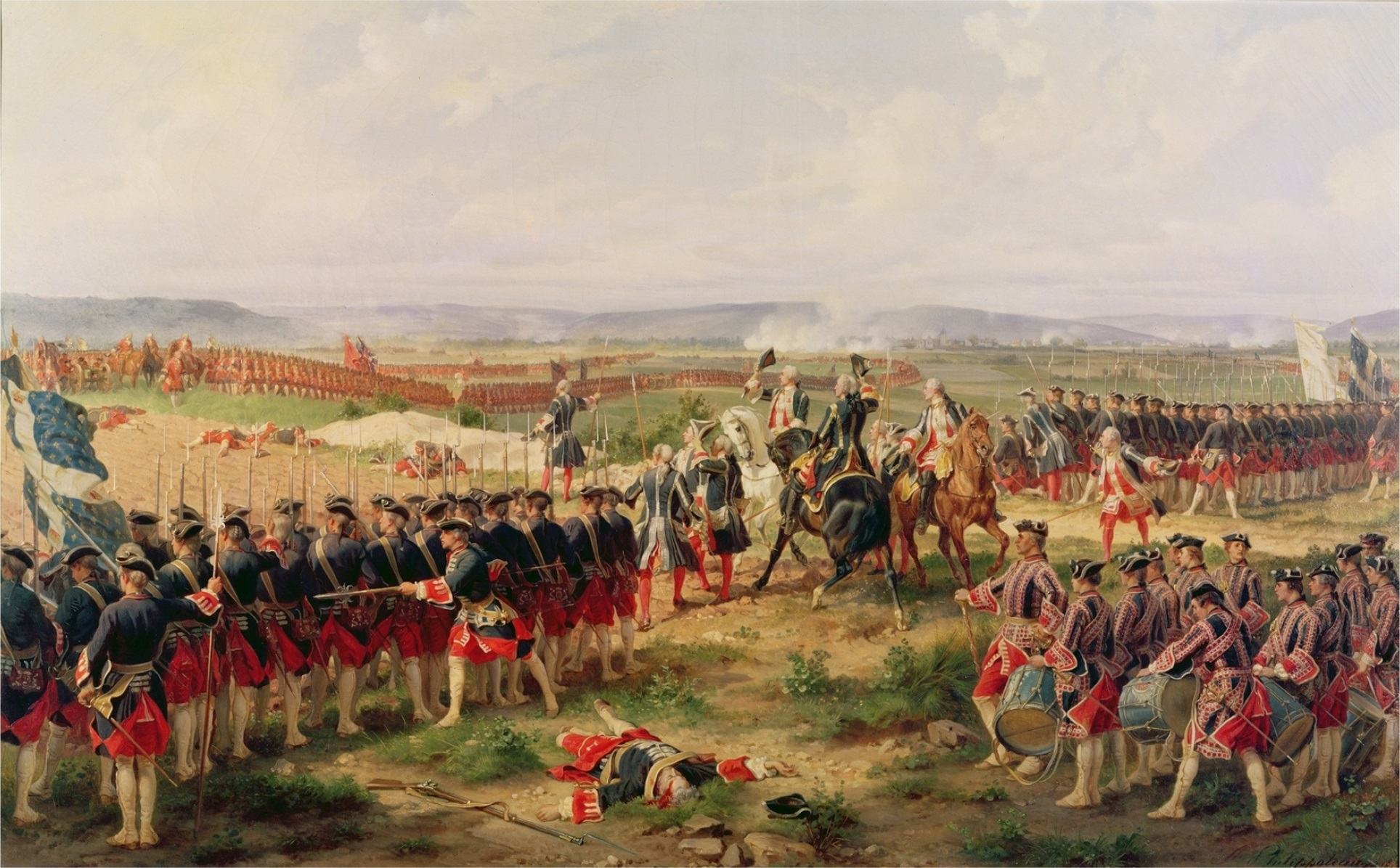
The Gardes Françaises and the British Guards confronted each other at Fontenoy in 1745. Lord Charles Hay, a British officer, reportedly said, "Tell your men to fire". The Count d'Auteroche, officer of the Gardes françaises, replied, "No, we never fire first".

In 1789, the Gardes Françaises constituted the largest element of the Household troops (Maison Militaire du Roi). Six grenadier and 24 fusilier companies were divided into the six battalions that comprised the full regiment. The total number of Gardes Françaises amounted to about 3,600 men. The regimental colonel usually held the rank of Marshal of France. Captains of the grenadier companies ranked as colonels in the infantry of the line. There was one grenadier company (109 officers and men) and four fusilier companies (each numbering 132 officers and men) to each battalion.

=== Image and recruitment basis ===
The subsequent image of the Gardes Françaises as a socially-elite palace unit led solely by courtier officers may be largely incorrect. Most of the regimental officers were from outside Paris, and some, such as the future Maréchal Abraham de Fabert, did not have even the status of provincial aristocrats.

The rank and file were recruited from all over France but through marriages and off-duty employment, they quickly established local ties in Paris, which were to influence their behaviour at the outbreak of the French Revolution. Guardsmen were enlisted for a minimum of eight years and were required to be French nationals with a minimum height of 1.73 m (5 ft 8 in), compared with the 1.68 m (5 ft 6 in) of line infantry soldiers.

The reported incident at the Battle of Fontenoy in which officers of the Gardes Françaises and their English counterparts invited each other to fire first is sometimes cited as an example of excessive chivalry amongst aristocratic opponents. However, in 18th-century warfare, the unit that held its fire until it was closest to the enemy would be able to deliver the most effective volley. On this occasion the Gardes Françaises fired first, with limited effect, and sustained heavy casualties, of 411 dead and wounded.

=== Uniform ===
During the years 1664 to 1789 the regiment wore dark "king's blue" coats, with red collars, cuffs and waistcoats. Breeches were red (later white), and leggings were white. Grenadiers had high fur hats, and the fusilier companies wore the standard tricorn of the French infantry. Coats and waistcoats were heavily embroidered in white or silver (for officers) braid.

=== French Revolution ===
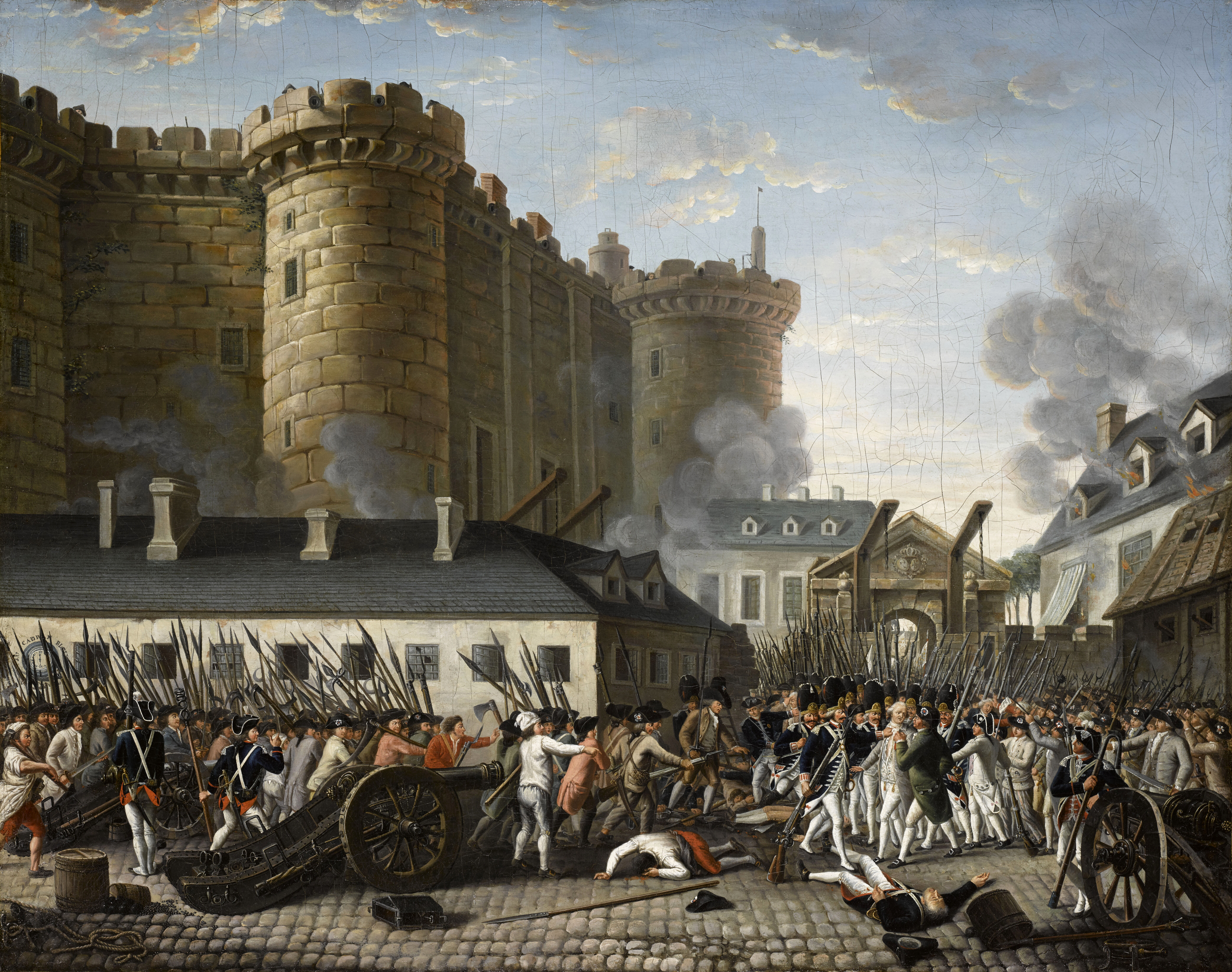
Rebel Gardes Françaises (in blue uniforms at left and centre-right) took part in the storming of the Bastille and the arrest of its governor, the marquis de Launay, shown above.

The sympathy shown by the Gardes Françaises for the French Revolution at its outbreak was crucial to the initial success of the rising. The other two units of the Maison militaire du roi de France at the time, the Swiss Guards and the Bodyguard, remained loyal to the king, but they were smaller units than the Gardes Françaises and lacked the Parisian connections of the latter regiment.

During weeks of disturbances prior to early July 1789 leading up to the fall of the Bastille, the regiment initially obeyed orders and on several occasions, it acted against the increasingly-unruly crowds. In April, during a riot at the Réveillon wallpaper factory, guardsmen had fired on a hostile crowd, killing and wounding several hundreds. However, in addition to local ties with the Parisians, the regiment was resentful of the harsh Prussian style discipline introduced by its colonel, the Duc du Châtelet, who had taken up his appointment the year before. The officers of the regiment had negligently left day-to-day control in the hands of the non-commissioned officers, and had limited interaction with their men. These factors led to desertions from 27 June onward, followed by an incident on 12 July in which French Guards fired on the Royal-Allemand Regiment and the final defection of most of the rank and file on 14 July. Reportedly, only one of the sergeants stood by the officers when they tried to reassemble their men in the courtyard of the Paris barracks of the Guard. Of the six battalions (sub-units of about 600 men each) in the whole of the regiment, the equivalent of only one battalion remained obedient to orders. The mutineers played a key role in the attack on the Bastille, where they were credited with both the effective use of artillery cannons and with preventing a massacre of the garrison after surrender.

Following the fall of the Bastille, the Gardes Françaises petitioned to resume their guard duties at Versailles. However, this proposal was declined, and the regiment was formally disbanded on 31 August 1789.

On 15 July 1789 all the officers of the Gardes Françaises, led by their colonel, had resigned their commissions. In a letter dated 21 July, addressed to the Marquis de Lafayette, King Louis XVI authorized 3,600 rank and file members of the regiment, including the regimental band, to enter the newly raised Garde Bourgeoise. The Gardes Françaises subsequently provided the professional core of the Garde Nationale. As such, they acted under the command of the Marquis de Lafayette to restore order when a mob from Paris invaded the Palace of Versailles at dawn on 6 October 1789, and escorted the Royal Family to Paris in the afternoon of the same day. In October 1792, the former Gardes Françaises were distributed among the new volunteer units that were being mobilised for war. In their final role, the erstwhile royal guardsmen provided cadres (officers and senior non-commissioned officers) for the revolutionary armies of 1792 to 1802.

Following the Bourbon restoration of 1814, attempts were made to recreate most of the various military units that had formerly made up the Royal Household. However, the defection of the Gardes Françaises at a crucial point in the revolution could not be forgotten, and no attempt was made to re-establish that regiment.

== Battles ==
- Saint-Denis (1567)
- St. Bartholomew's Day massacre (1572)
- Day of the Barricades (1588)
- La Rochelle (1627–1628)
- Lens (1648)
- Fleurus (1690)
- Steenkerque (1692)
- Ramillies (1706)
- Malplaquet (1709)
- Dettingen (1743)
- Fontenoy (1745)
- The Storming of the Bastille (1789)

== Notable members ==
- Pierre de Montesquiou d'Artagnan
- François d'Aubusson de La Feuillade
- Charles de Blanchefort
- Nicolas Catinat
- Abraham de Fabert
- Louis Friant
- Armand Louis de Gontaut
- Antoine III de Gramont
- Antoine Galiot Mandat de Grancey
- Lazare Hoche
- François Joseph Lefebvre
- Filippo di Piero Strozzi

== Gallery ==
Gardes françaises
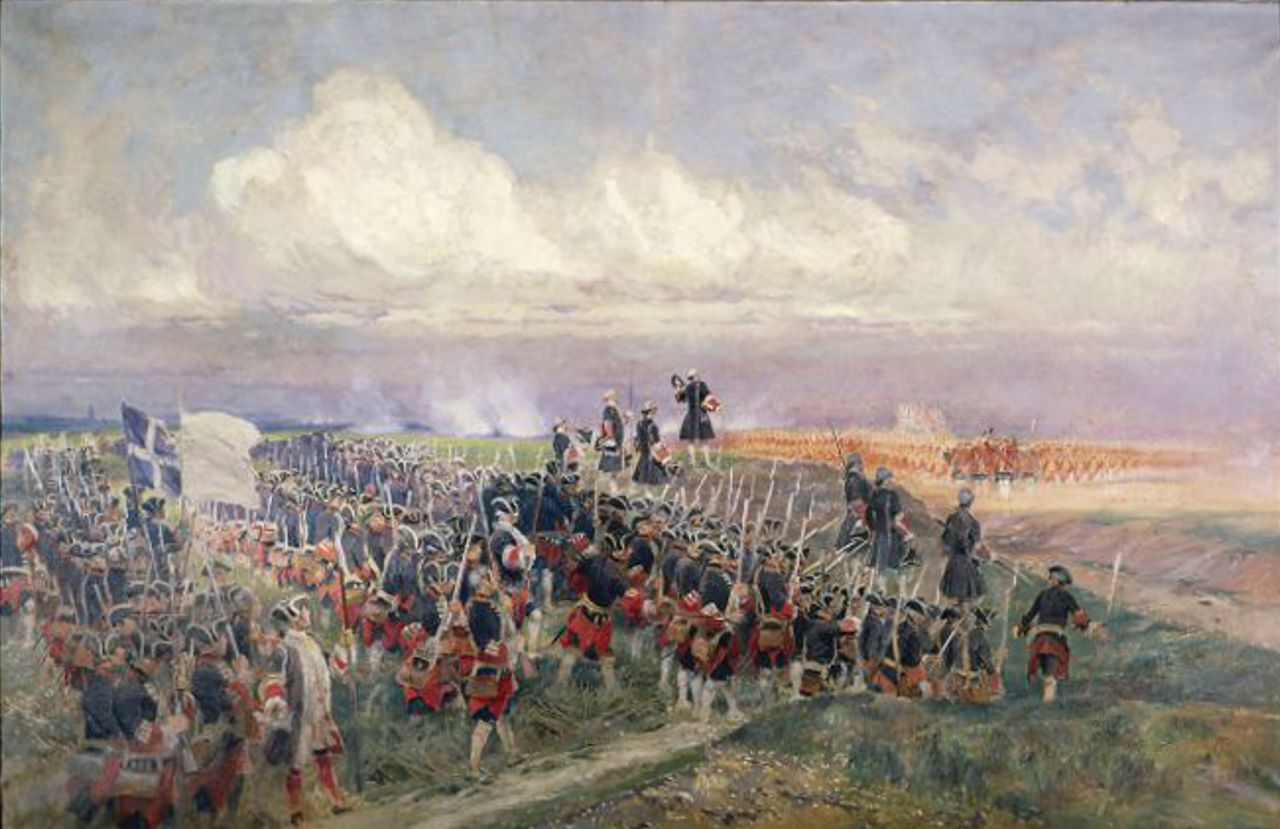
Gardes françaises at the battle of Fontenoy

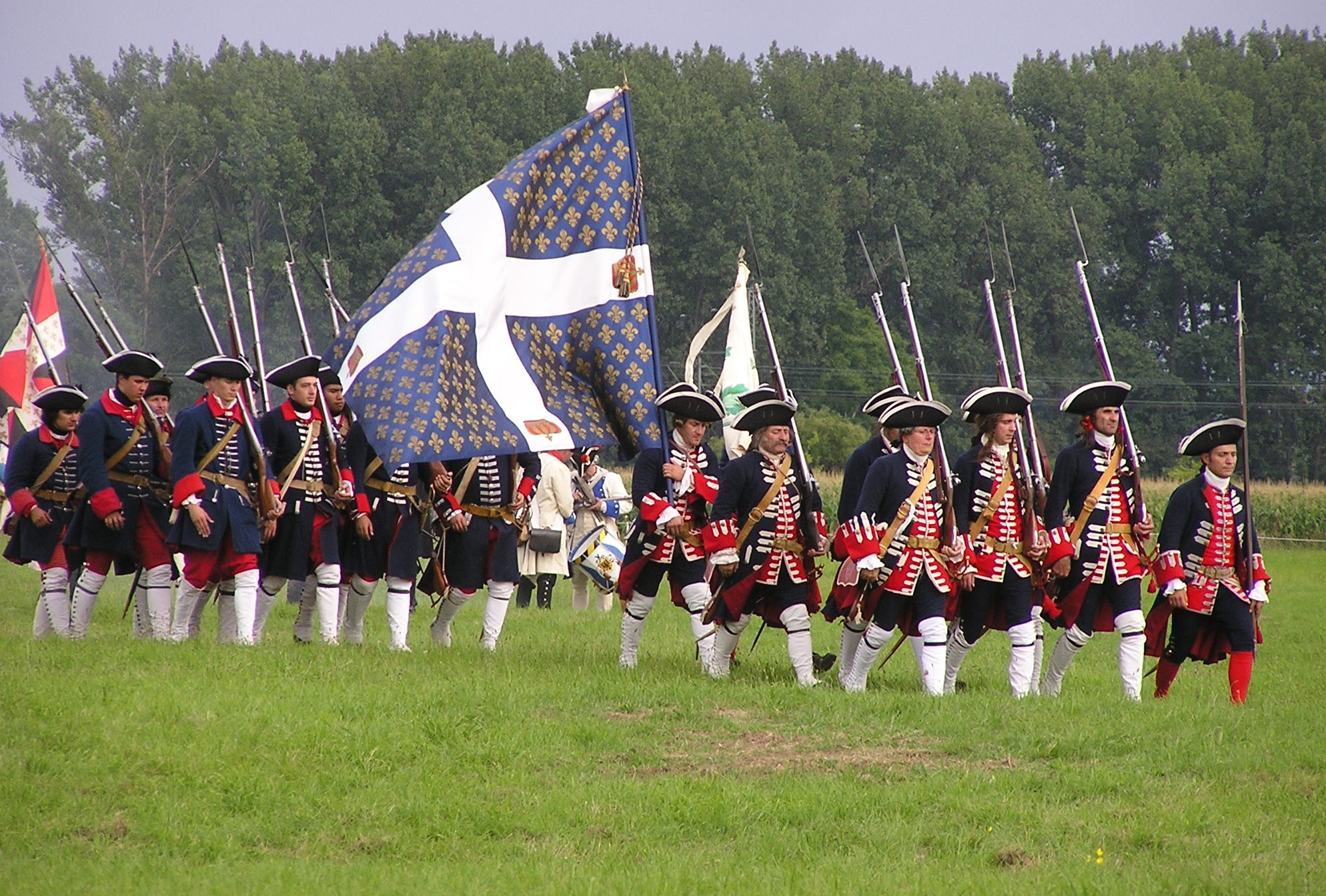
Gardes françaises reenactors
