= Antoine Galiot Mandat de Grancey =

French Army officer (1731–1792)

Antoine Jean Galiot Mandat de Grancey (7 May 1731 – 10 August 1792), known as the Marquis de Mandat, was a French military officer and politician. A knight and lord of Berny-en-Santerre and Les Pins in the Vendômois, he became a colonel in the Gardes-Françaises, then succeeded La Fayette as commander of the National Guard in 1792. He was assassinated by insurgents (possibly Jean Antoine Rossignol) in the insurrection of 10 August during the French Revolution.

== Family ==
=== Heraldic arms ===
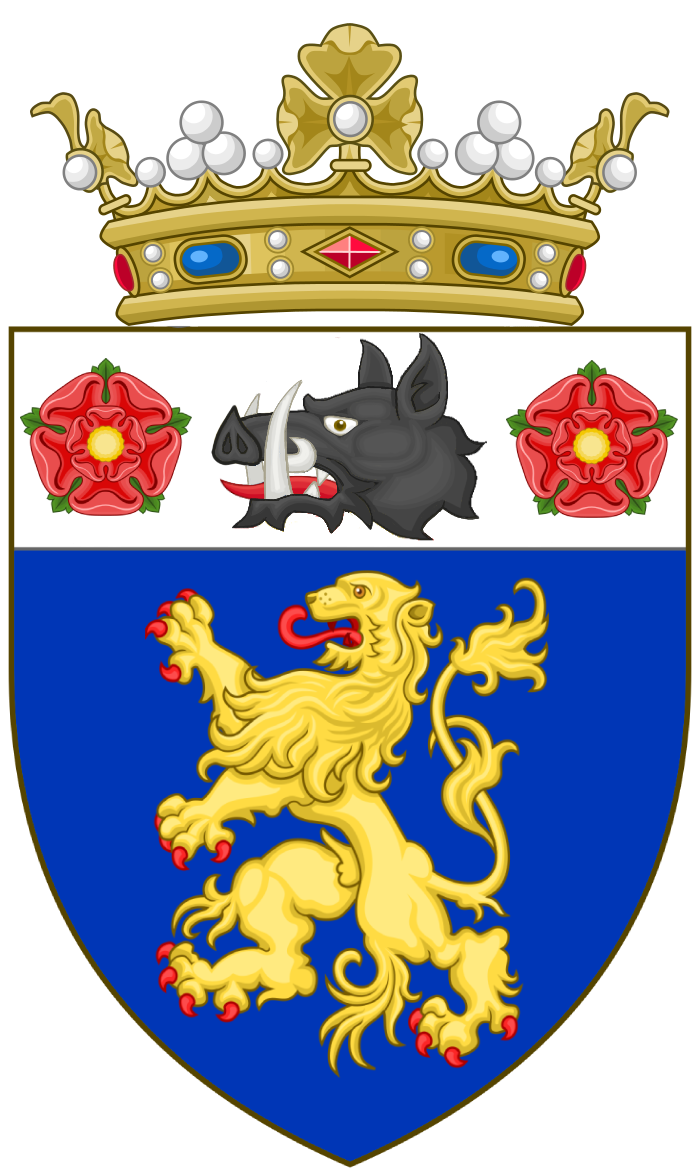
Coat-of-Arms of Antoine Galiot Mandat de Grancey, Marquis de Mandat

Azure, with a lion or; au chef d'argent, chargé d'une hure de sanglier de sable, défendue d'argent, accostée de deux roses de gueules; or, in English, "Azure, a lion or; on a chief argent, charged with a head of wild boar sable tusked argent, having to the sides two roses gules."

=== History ===
The family had formerly been a noble family in the Limousin, attested since 1339. Galiot Mandat, lord of Aigrefoin, was received as king's secretary for provisions on 31 October 1572 on the resignation of Louis Guybert and his father. Its descendants were in two branches, of which the elder died out when Antoine-Galiot Mandat, conseiller to the parlement de Metz by letters dated May 1640, received as conseiller to the parlement de Paris on 14 July 1649, died unmarried and without issue. The other branch, known as the barons of Nully (in Champagne), has continued until our days and distinguish itself for many generations by its devotion to the monarchy.

Antoine Galiot Mandat was the son of Galiot V Mandat (1683–1755), Maître des Requêtes ordinaire de l'Hôtel du Roi, received to the Grand Conseil on 6 March 1720. His mother, Marie Anne Cherouvrier des Grassières, was sister-in-law to marquis Louis-Urbain-Aubert de Tourny, Intendant of the Généralité de Limoges. The king confirmed his father in the land and seigneurie of Les Pins, in the north east of Touraine on 13 June 1727.

== Life ==
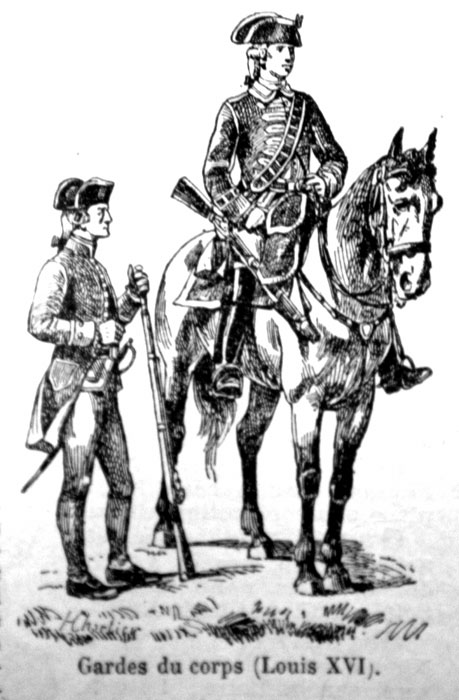
Marquis Galiot Mandat de Grancey was a former officer in the Maison militaire du roi de France, like many members of his family.

=== Before 1789 ===
Mandat de Grancey was baptised at Église Saint-Sulpice. He served in the First Company of Musketeers of the Garde ordinaire du Roi from 26 November 1753 to 2 March 1755, as enseigne à drapeau in the regiment of Gardes-Françaises (1755–57), then as Enseigne à Pique (from 5 June 1757) and sous-lieutenant (23 December 1759) in the same regiment.

Antoine Galiot Mandat married Angélique Simone Boucher, daughter of a conseiller to the Parlement of Paris on 21 January 1758. They had two children – Alexandre, ensign to the regiment of the Gardes-Françaises, and a daughter married to a conseiller to the Parlement of Paris. Antoine's father split his fortune between his children on his death on 6 April 1762.

In 1789, he left the Gardes-Françaises, with the rank of captain or colonel retiré du service, according to Chenaye-Desbois. He was also a knight of the ordre royal et militaire de Saint-Louis. He tried in vain to become a gentleman of the court, but had to renounce his place despite his annual rent of 180,000 francs.

In the pre-revolutionary period Marquis Antoine-Jean-Galiot de Mandat was well respected by his acquaintances in Les Pins, in the north east of Touraine, even by those who would soon lead Revolutionary efforts in the area. He is known in history as "a noble who embraced the revolutionary party" and thus his behaviour corresponded to that of his neighbours and peasants.

=== After 1789 ===
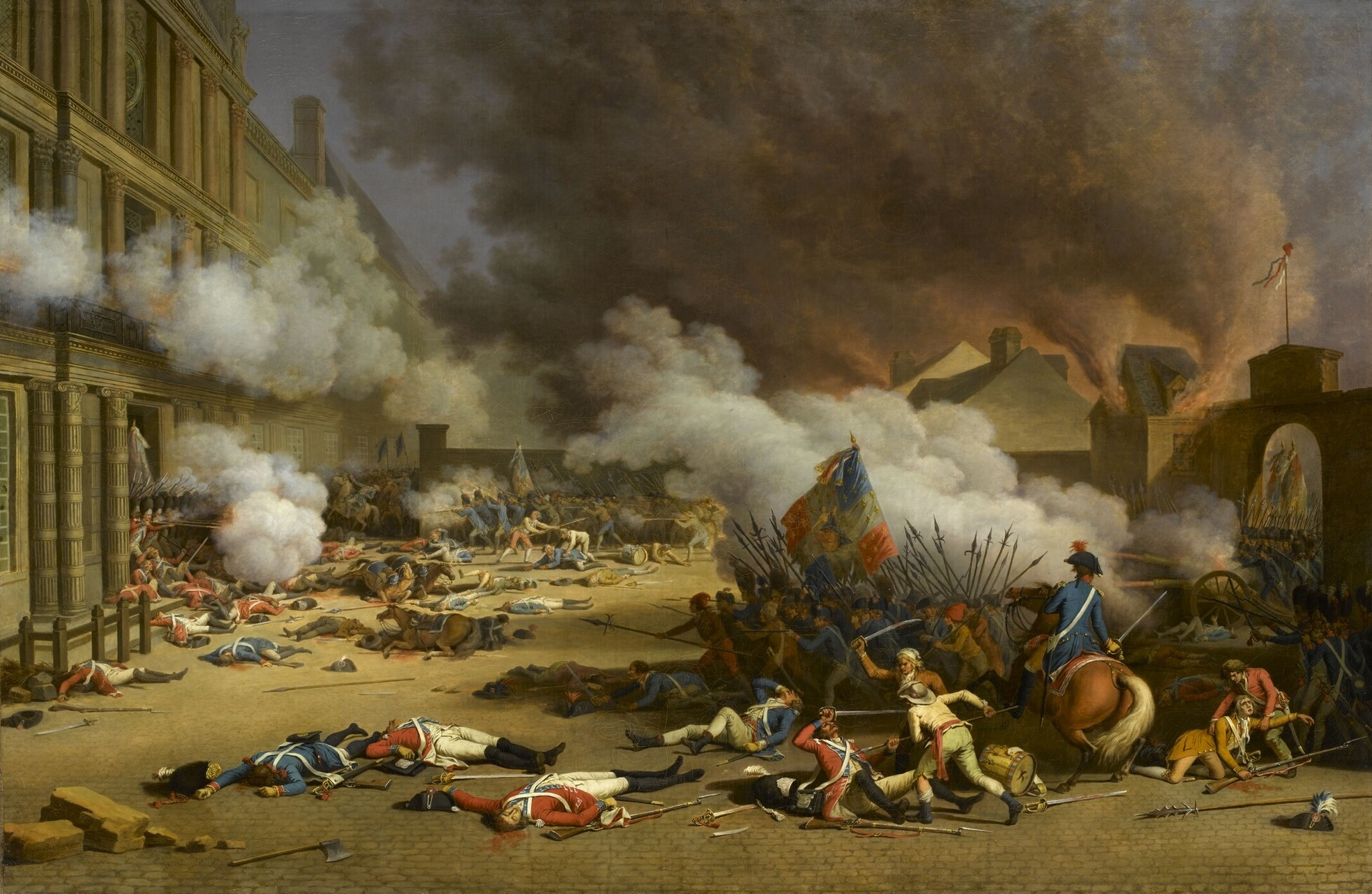
The assault on the Tuileries on 10 August 1792. The defence in the palace became disorganised after Galiot Mandat de Grancey was shot.

In 1789 Antoine Galliot Mandat was aged 58. He was head of the 4th Legion of the National Guard. He lived at rue Chapon, n° 3. Brave and loyal to his oath to defend the inviolability of the head of state and the head of state's house, he supported the new ideas but remained highly devoted to Louis XVI. He inspired great confidence in the royal court (in the words of Adolphe Thiers "to the cause by his energy and his lights". His remarks leave no doubt as to his fidelity to the king:

I know the fate in store for me, but I reply for the king's fate until my last breath. I shall never leave my post voluntarily.

His ideas favouring a constitutional monarchy arose from those close to the king. Madame Campan, whose father was a friend of Mandat, answered Louis XVI's question "Who is this Mandat who at this moment commands the National Guard?" by saying "Sire, he is the most faithful of your subjects, but with much loyalty and very little intelligence. He is in the interests of the Constitution.". The National Guard's attitude in 1792 was less loyal than Mandat's, though it varied from battalion to battalion:

One evening, on an excellent National Guard arriving at the Tuileries, the Queen went to the petit jardin du Dauphin, from which she returned via the terrasse de l’Eau. The federates passing along the quay, spotting the Queen, insulted her. Marie-Antoinette wanted to withdraw, but the National Guards begged her to do nothing and left them "to make these wits learn that we are not afraid of them". They thus cried "Long live the King and the royal family!". The federates complained about this at the Assembly the following day and the Assembly, although informed of their insolence, congratulated them. The National Guards who accompanied the Queen were from the battalion of the Filles Saint Thomas.

Guy de Rambaud also wrote that "the bataillon des Filles-Saint-Thomas, bataillon des Petits-Pères, bataillon de Henri IV and bataillon des Grands Augustins, protected us from brigands and rebels".

Antoine Galiot Mandat "always offered his head as a guarantee of the king's good intentions", but after the flight to Varennes and due to revolutionary propaganda he could no longer succeed in convincing all the national guards. The battalions of the Saint-Antoine and Saint-Marceau faubourgs were openly hostile to him from 1789 onwards and in the other battalions the poorest guards were favourable to Jacobin ideas.

=== Mandat replaces La Fayette ===
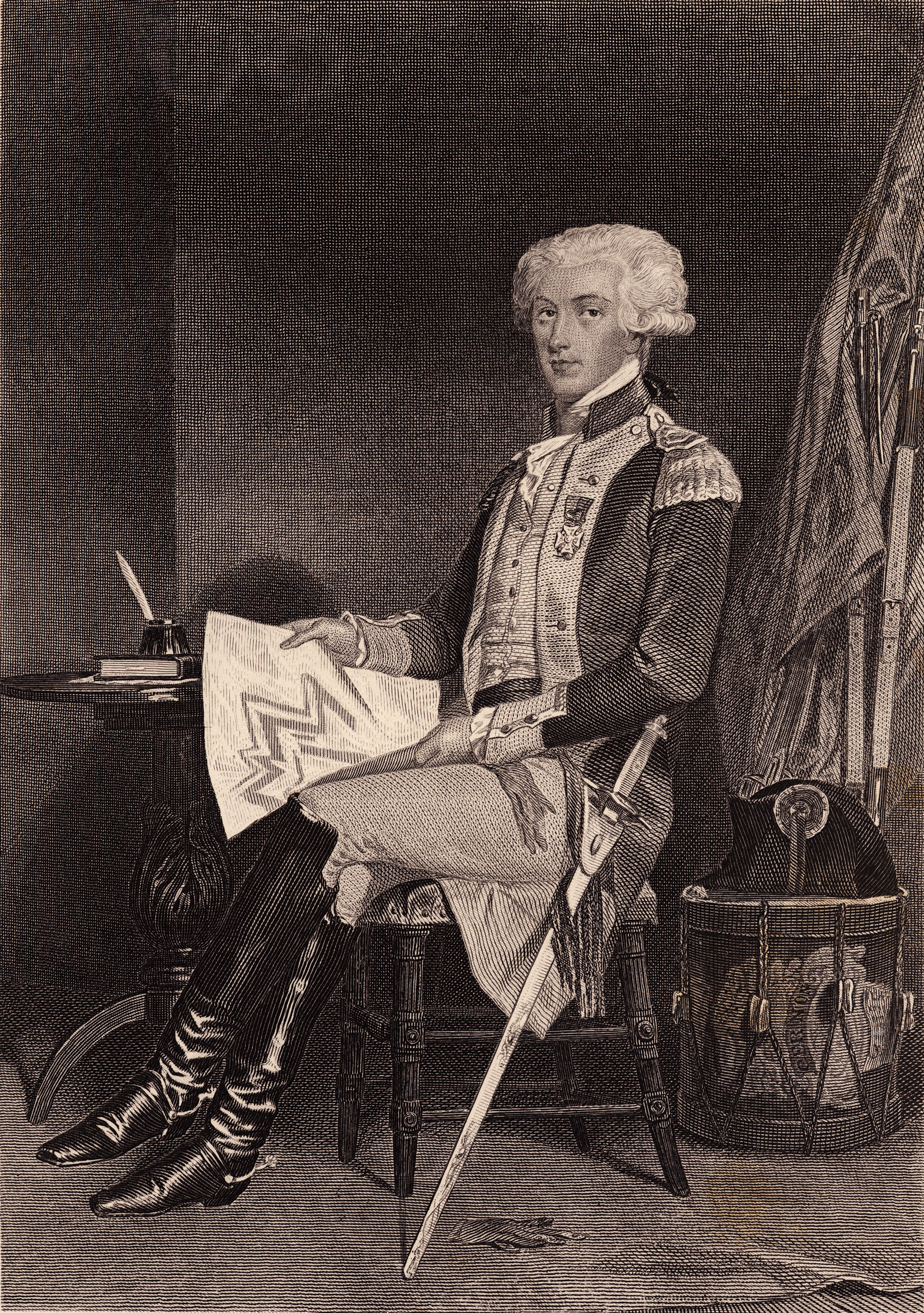
La Fayette

He replaced La Fayette shortly before 10 August 1792 as commander in chief of the National Guard. La Fayette had been a victim of false rumours as to his conduct and impeached. This proposition, backed by Brissot and heatedly fought by Vincent-Marie Viénot de Vaublanc and Quatremère de Quincy, was repulsed by a majority of 406 votes against 224.

Because of the vote, the deputies who had provoked him were assaulted, beaten and threatened with death after the session had ended, until the National Guard came to their rescue. According to Hippolyte Taine: "As to de Vaublanc, the main defender of La Fayette, having been attacked three times, he had taken the precaution not to go home but angry mobs showed up at his house, shouting that "eighty people will perish at their hands, and he would be first." Twelve men who had climbed into his apartment and rummaged around also ransacked nearby houses, and, unable to catch him, looked for his family; they warned that if he returned to his home, he would be killed." La Fayette tendered his resignation.

The assault on the Tuileries by Sans-culottes, Fédérés from the countryside and volunteers from Marseille under Charles Barbaroux was set for 10 August. They were given gunpowder and bullets by the municipality – a fact known to the court.

Mandat, whose side was outnumbered, intended to defend the courts by posting some Swiss Guards and grenadiers. He even amassed the National Guard in the garden and placed cannons on Pont Neuf and near Tour Saint-Jacques, to stop the rioters' descent from faubourgs in the south and east.

=== Mandat's assassination ===
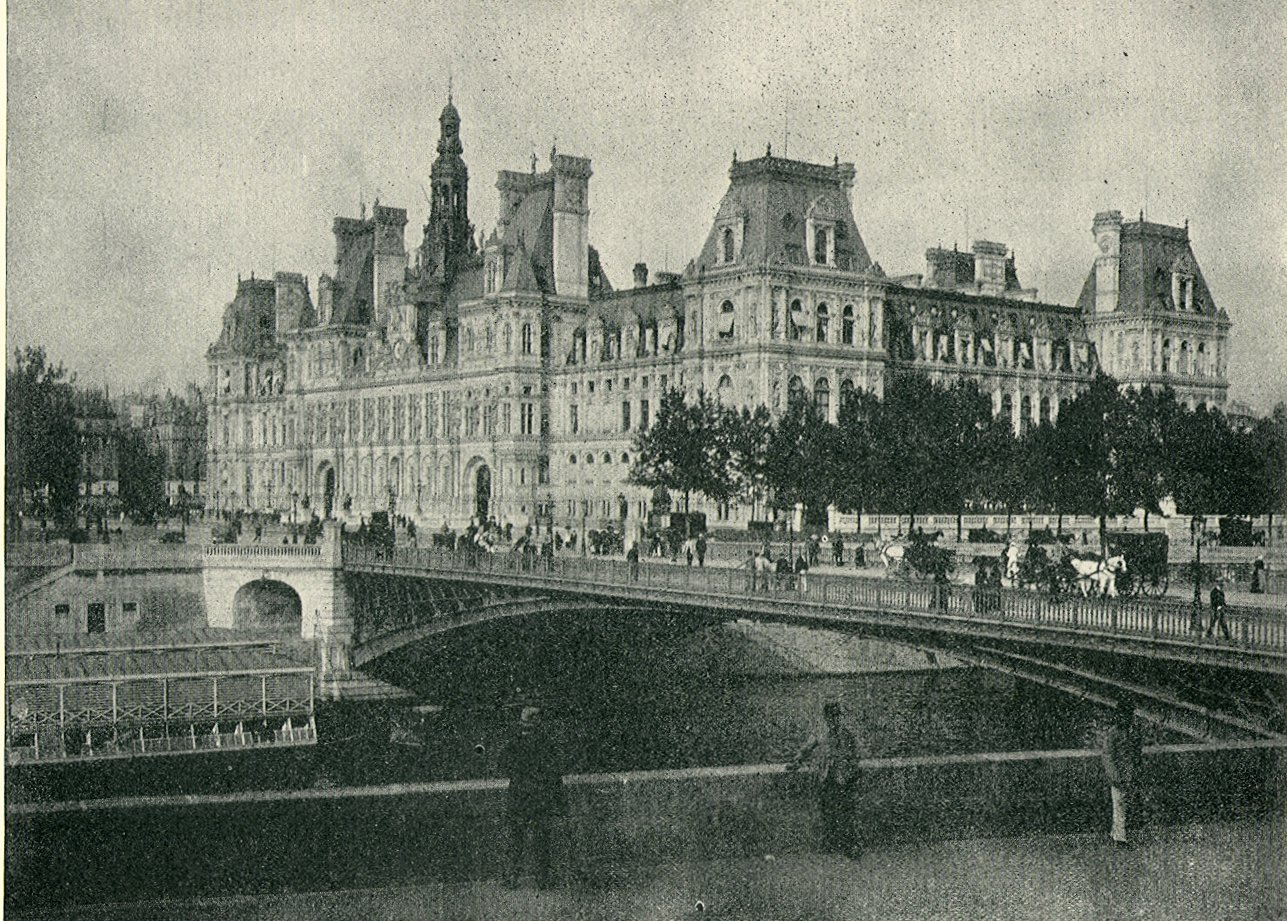
Galiot Mandat de Grancey was massacred by the crowd on the steps of the Hôtel de Ville

Before the attack, Mandat was summoned to the Hôtel de Ville by Georges Danton and the new Paris Commune at 3 or 4 a.m. He went there with his aide de camp after previously refusing to go there. Pierre Louis Roederer told him "The commander of the National Guard is under the orders of the municipality." Mandat acted without receiving orders from Jérôme Pétion de Villeneuve, the mayor of Paris. However he sent Villeneuve a letter that asked for orders. Mandat wrote to Villeneuve:

Mr. Mayor,

Your presence is necessary, appearances are threatening, and as magistrate of the people, you are better than anyone at making those who have lost their way listen to reason. Please join my efforts.

The commanding general,

Mandat.

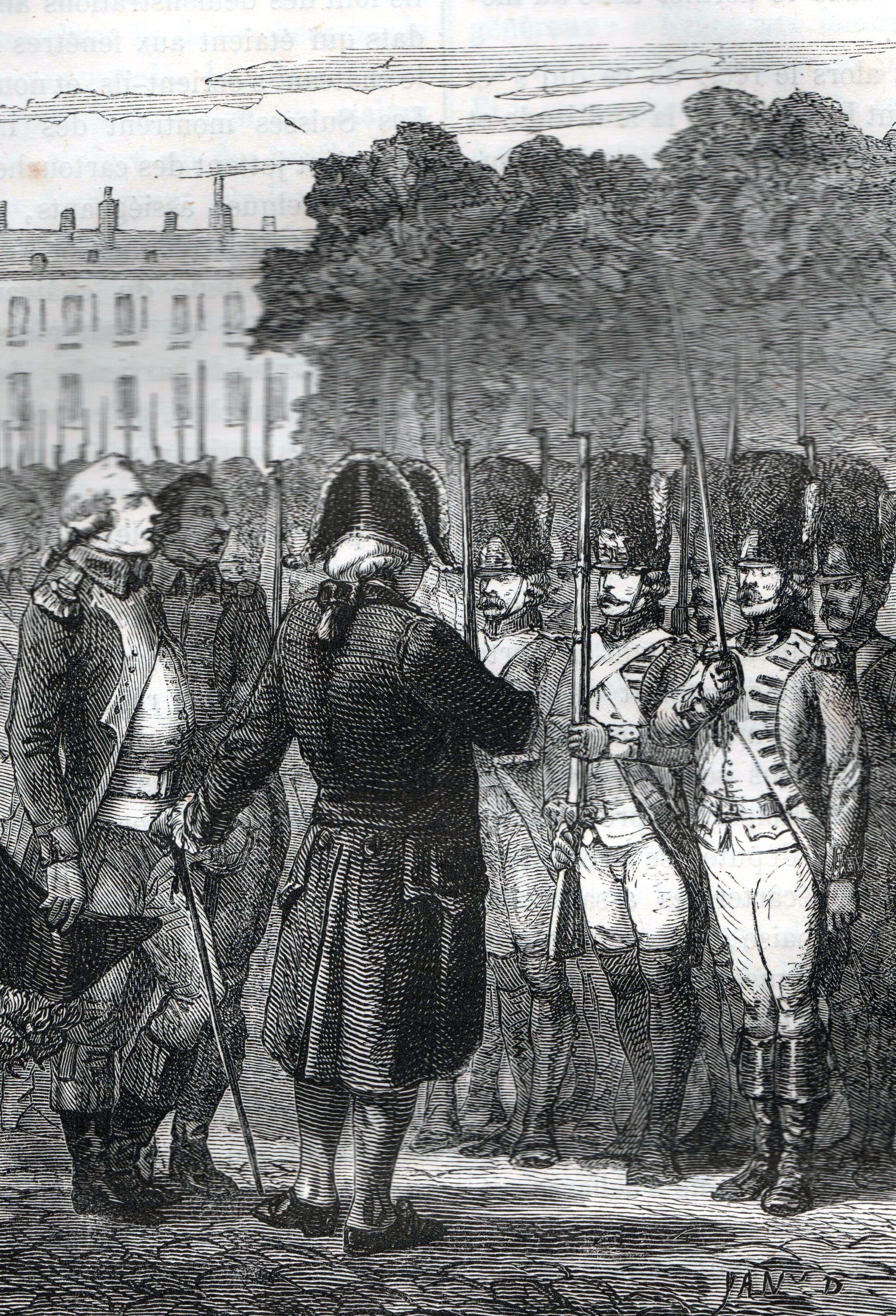
Louis XVI reviewing the troops defending the palais des Tuileries with Augustin-Joseph de Mailly, marshal of France, before the battles of 10 August.

At the time Mandat was summoned, 47 of the 48 sections of Paris had added three commissioners to a municipal body that would have the mission to meet at the new Paris Commune for the purpose of saving France. Therefore, Mandat would have to deal with a new municipal body made up of insurgent revolutionaries.

Mandat found himself in the middle of a crowd that pushed him to the steps of the Hôtel de Ville. There, he left his aide de camp; all eyes were fixed on Mandat. Arriving in the great hall of the Hôtel de Ville, Mandat found himself facing unfamiliar and stern faces. One of the members of the new Commune asked him, "By what order did you double the guard of the castle?" Mandat replied, "By order of the mayor of Paris."

A member of the Commune brought an unsealed letter and asked to read it out loud. This letter had an order to the commander of the battalion posted at the Arcade Saint-Jean that enjoined him to launch an attack from behind against the revolutionaries who would go to the Tuileries Palace while the battalion posted at Pont Neuf would attack the flank of the revolutionaries.

The revolutionaries arrested Mandat, searched him and interrogated him about the order he had given. They wanted to send him to prison de l'Abbaye. President of the Commune Sulpice Huguenin, also known as Peltier, said, "Let us train him!"

Mandat had barely descended three steps from the steps of the Hôtel de Ville in Paris when he was shot in the head by a pistol. Wounded, he got up and was instantly struck by 20 pike blows. His son, who was going to meet him, cried, "My father! My father!"

Louis-Marie Prudhomme said that Jean Antoine Rossignol had ordered the revolutionaries to kill Mandat.

Soon, at the circle on the Place de Grève, the bloody head of Mandat was detached from his body and raised into the air. Mandat's aide de camp set off at a gallop to announce what he had seen to those at the Tuileries Palace. The assassins divided into two groups. One group threw the body into the Seine; the other group carried Mandat's head on a pike through the streets of Paris.

After Mandat's assassination, Antoine Joseph Santerre, a rich brewer from Faubourg Saint-Antoine, was appointed as the provisional commander of the insurgents.

== After his death ==
The sumptuous Hôtel du Président Duret, 67 rue de Lille, belonged to him in 1792 and remained in his son's ownership until 1797, despite Mandat's assassination.

== See also ==
- Edmond de Mandat-Grancey

== Notes and references ==
=== Bibliography ===
- Soboul, Albert (2005). Dictionnaire historique de la Révolution française. Paris: Quadrige / PUF. ISBN 978-2130536055.
