= Abraham de Fabert =

Marshal of France

Abraham de Fabert, marquis d'Esternay
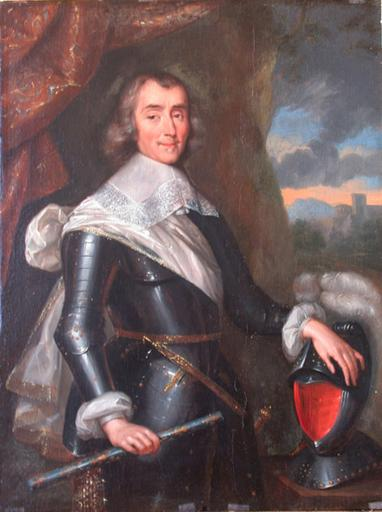
- Abraham de Fabert
- Born: 11 October 1599
- Died: 17 May 1662 (aged 62)
- Military career
- Allegiance: Kingdom of France
- Branch: French Army
- Rank: Marshal of France
- Unit: Gardes Françaises
- Conflicts: Huguenot rebellions 30 Years' War; Franco-Spanish War

Abraham de Fabert, marquis d'Esternay (11 October 1599 – 17 May 1662) was a Marshal of France.

== Biography ==
Fabert was the son of Abraham Fabert, seigneur de Moulins (died 1638), a famous printer who rendered great services, civil and military, to Henry IV.

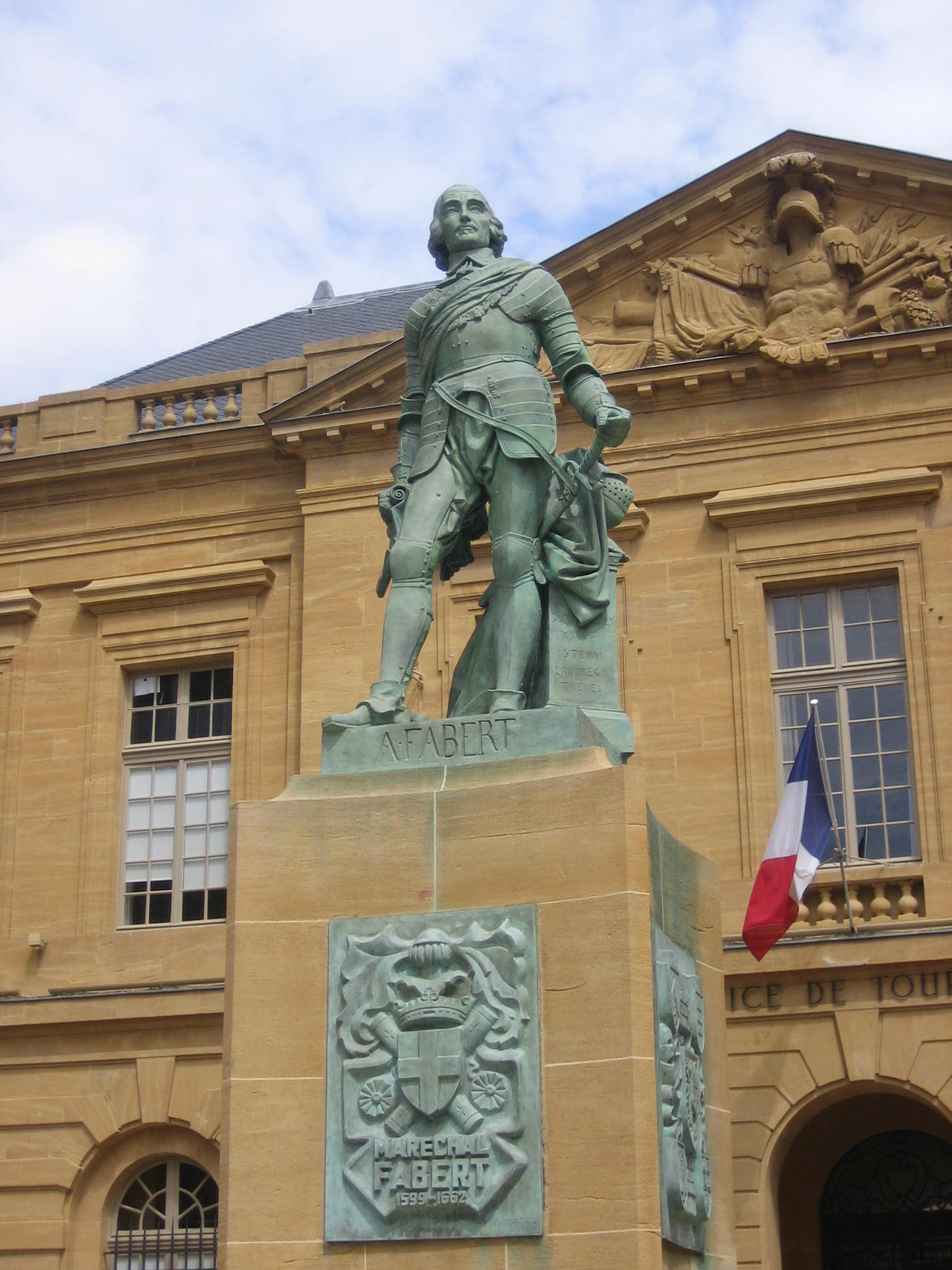
Statue of Abraham de Fabert in Metz, France

At the age of fourteen, Abraham de Fabert, against his father's wish, entered the Gardes Françaises, and in 1618 received a commission in the Piedmont regiment, becoming major in 1627. He distinguished himself repeatedly in the constant wars of the period, notably in La Rochelle and at the Siege of Exilles in 1630. His bravery and engineering skill were again displayed in the sieges of Avesnes and Maubeuge in 1637, and in 1642 Louis XIII made him governor of the recently acquired fortress of Sedan. In 1651 he became lieutenant-general, and in 1654 at the Siege of Stenay he introduced new methods of siegecraft which anticipated in a measure the great improvements of Vauban.

In the 1620s, Fabert created a number of regional maps, particularly of the emerging eastern frontier from the Ardennes south through Champagne.

In 1658 Fabert was made a marshal of France, being the first commoner to attain that rank. He died in 1662 from a pneumonia at Sedan, where he was governor.
