= Arthur Sanderson & Sons =

British fabric and wallpaper manufacturer, founded 1860

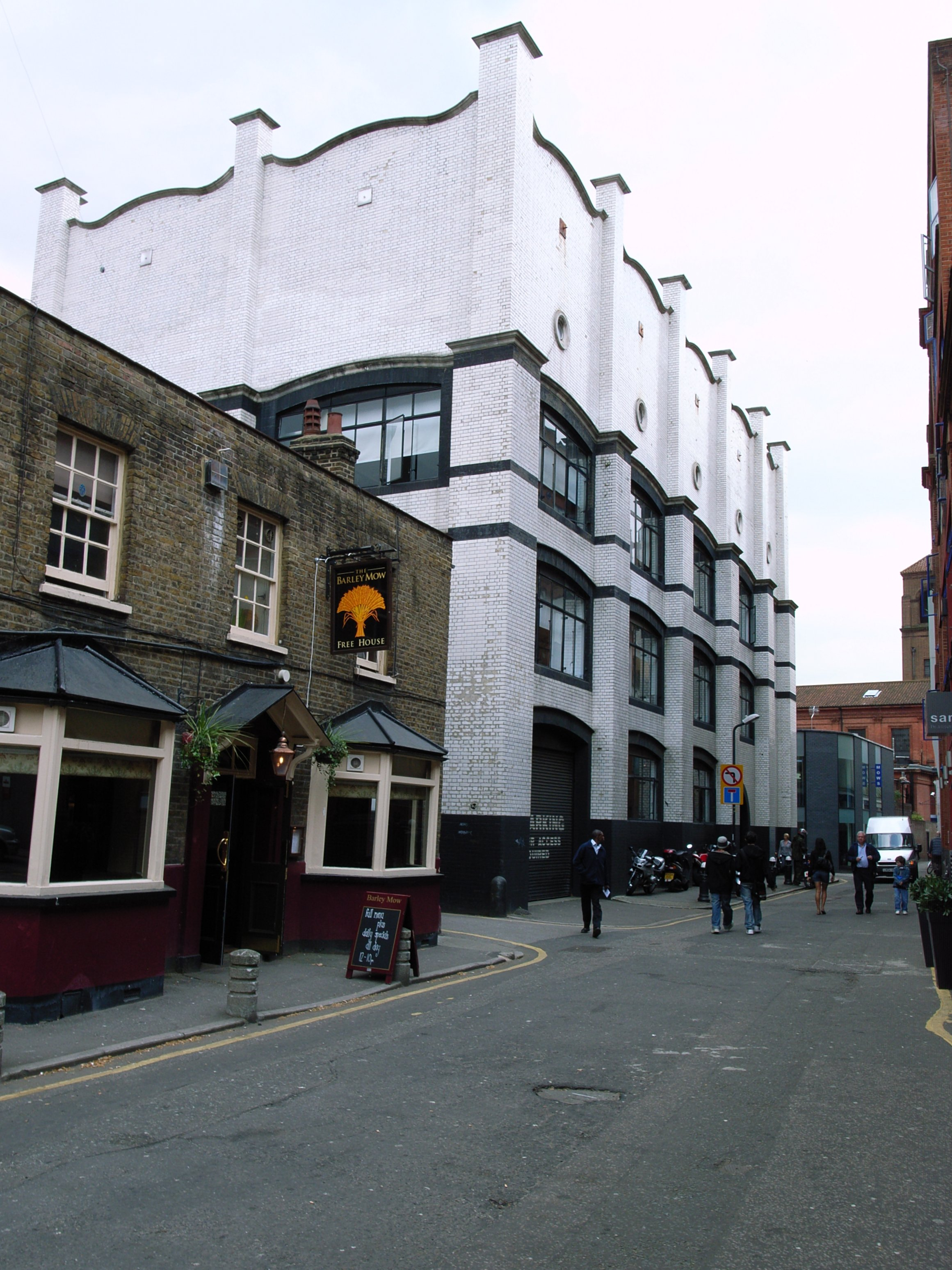
The former Sanderson wallpaper factory, Voysey House, Chiswick

Arthur Sanderson & Sons Ltd, now known simply as Sanderson, is a British manufacturer of fabrics and wallpaper, founded in 1860.

== Company ==
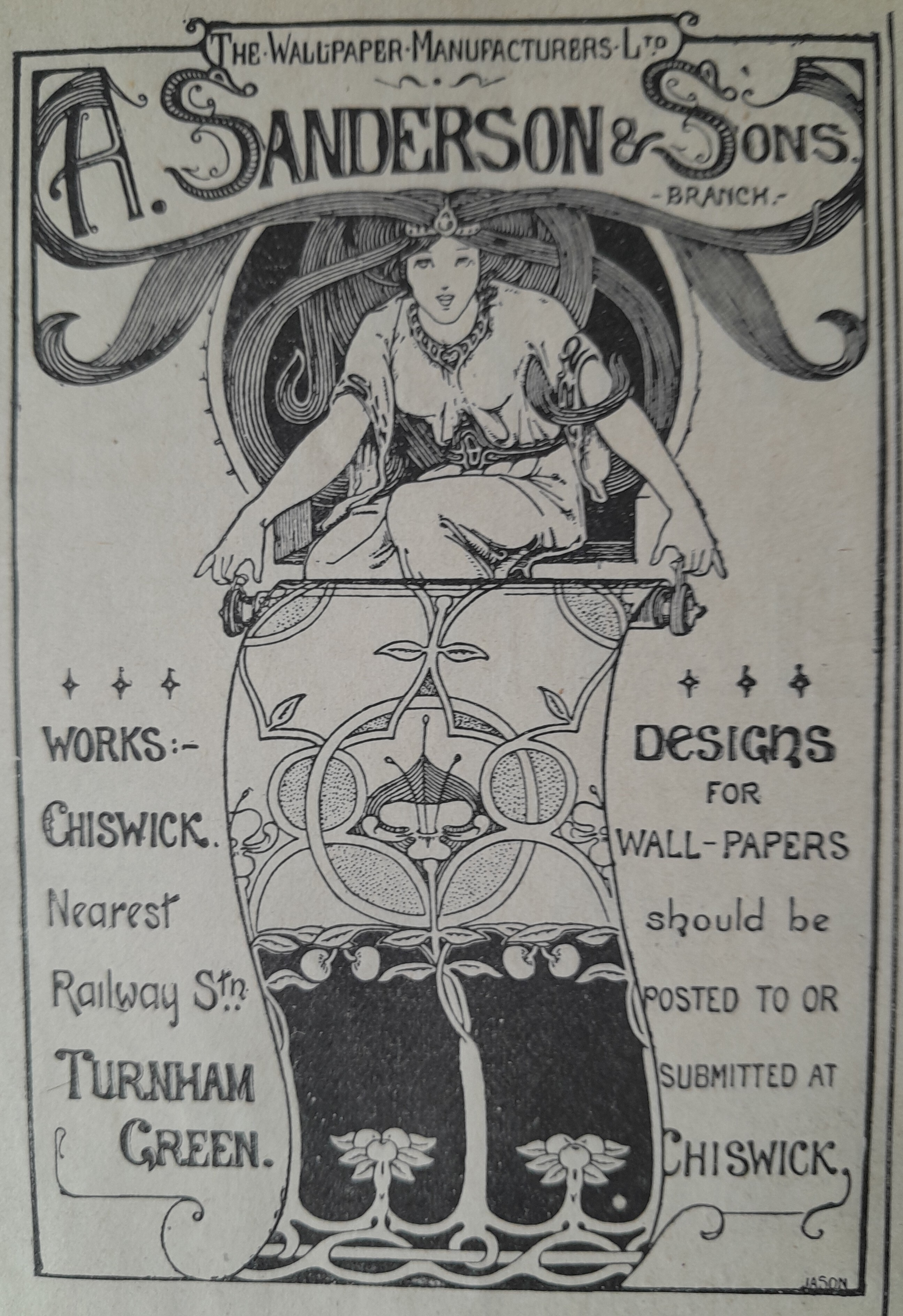
Advert for A. Sanderson & Sons 1901

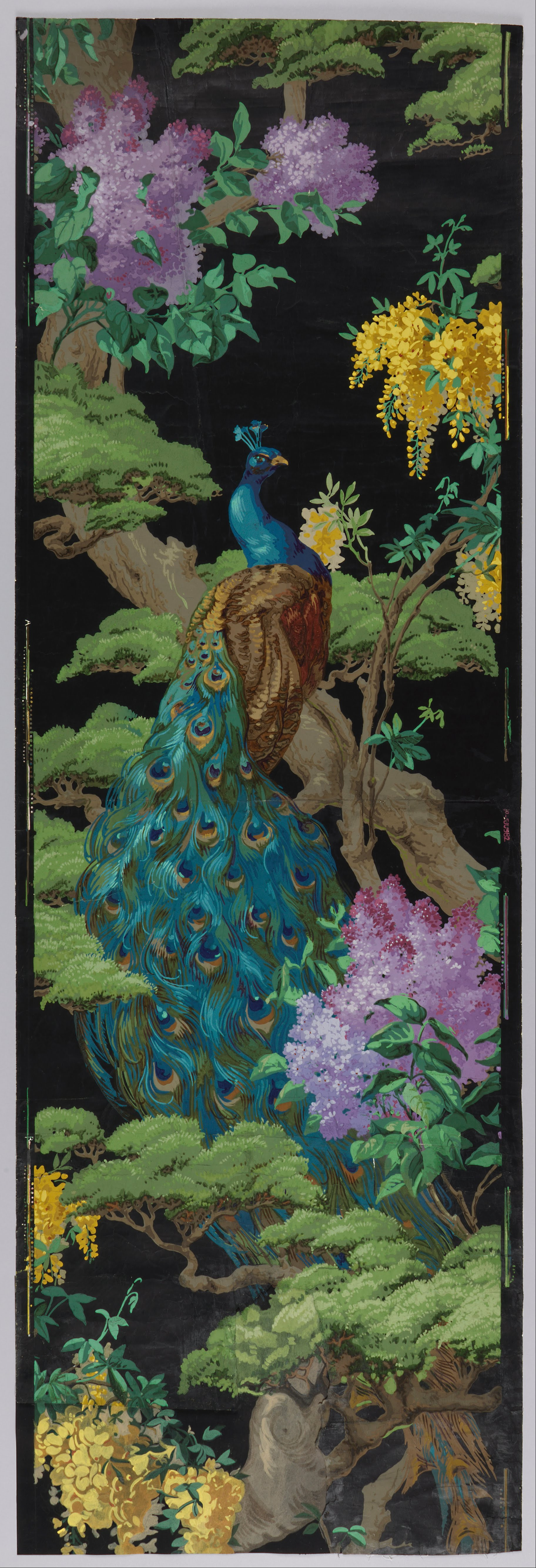
"The Cedar Tree", a Sanderson wallpaper, 1910. Block-printed on machine-made paper

The company was founded in 1860 in Islington, London, by Arthur Sanderson (1829–1882), who began by importing French wallpapers. After several moves, Sanderson established a factory of his own in Chiswick in 1879. An extension to the old factory was designed by Charles Voysey in 1902, and is now a Grade II* listed building called Voysey House. The old Chiswick factory, facing Voysey House, was gutted by fire in 1928 and is now used as offices.

After Arthur Sanderson's death, the business was taken over by his three sons, John, Arthur Bengough, and Harold. In 1919, Sanderson and Sons opened a new factory in Uxbridge to manufacture fabrics. In 1924, Arthur Bengough Sanderson received a Royal Warrant as "Purveyor of Wallpapers and Paints to King George V".

The original blocks for William Morris's wallpaper designs were included in the purchase of Jeffrey & Co. When Morris & Co. was dissolved in 1940, Sanderson and Sons bought its wallpaper business and rights to use the Morris name. Today, those archives are held by the parent company Sanderson Design Group, which acquired Sanderson, along with Morris & Co and other historic brands, in 2003. The collection is held in Chiswick, London, and is regularly used by the company's current designers, although it is not on public display.
