= Robert Graves Company =

American wallpaper manufacturer

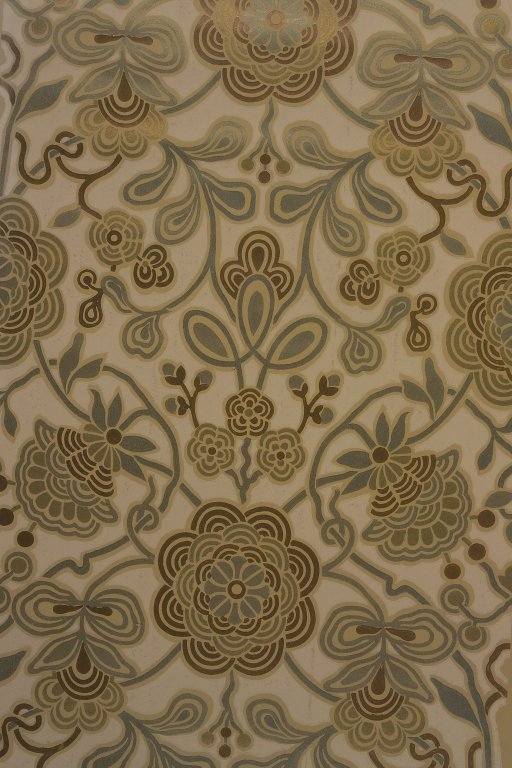
Wallpaper sample, Robert Graves Company.

The Robert Graves Company was an American wallpaper manufacturer based in New York City. The company was active between 1843 and 1929.

The company, founded by the Irish immigrant Robert Graves, first operated from a five-story showroom and factory building on East 35th Street, in the Madison Square area. The company's success necessitated larger premises; in the 1860s Graves moved the company to Brooklyn, near Fulton Street and Carlton Avenue. In the 1870s, the Brooklyn architect William B. Ditmars was commissioned to expand the Carlton street building, adding a new five-story building behind it.

The New York Times reported that the Brooklyn factory was scheduled to be sold at auction April 8, 1930.

Wallpapers produced by the company are in the collections of the Metropolitan Museum of Art, the Brooklyn Museum,

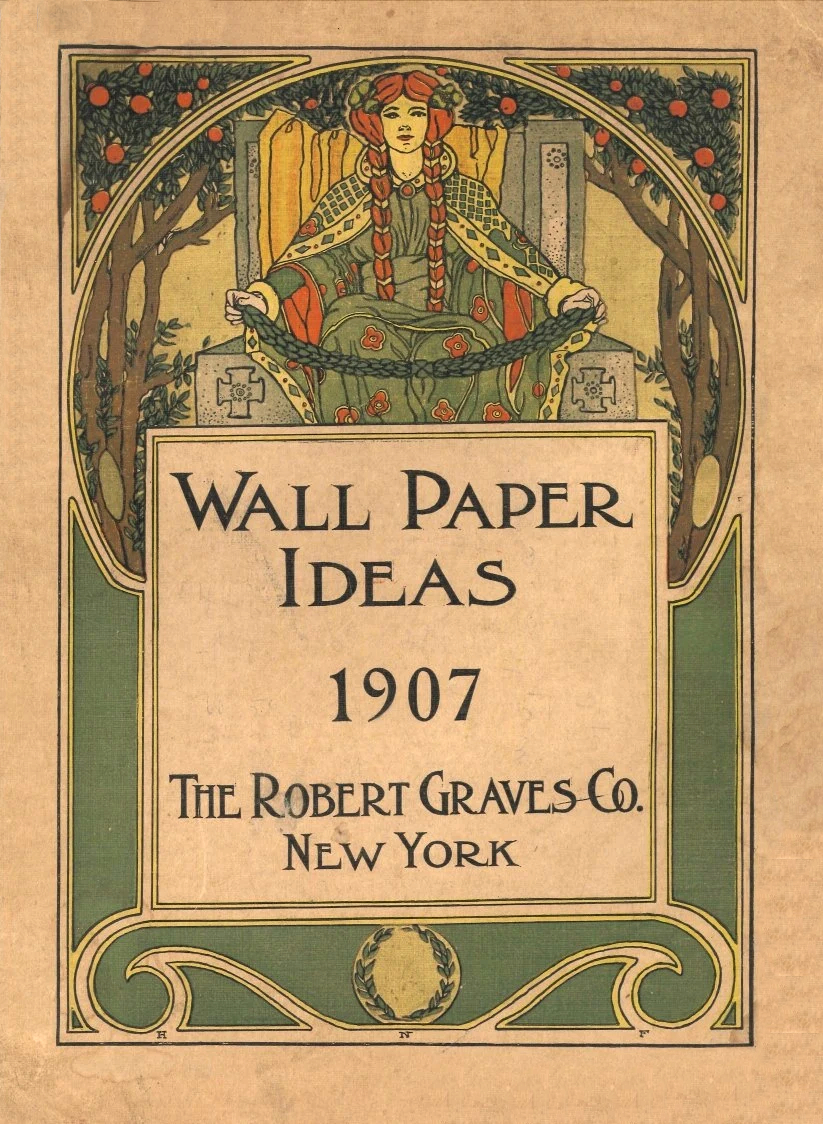
Robert Graves Company 1907 wallpaper catalogue.

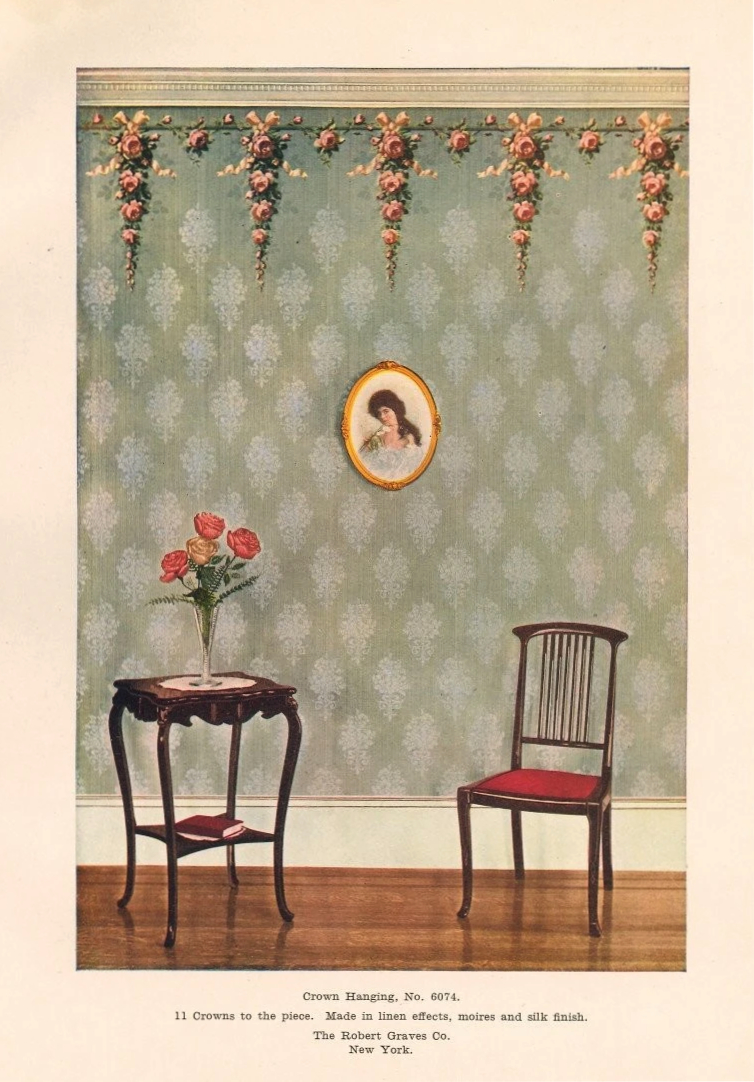
Excerpt from a 1907 Robert Graves Company wallpaper catalogue.

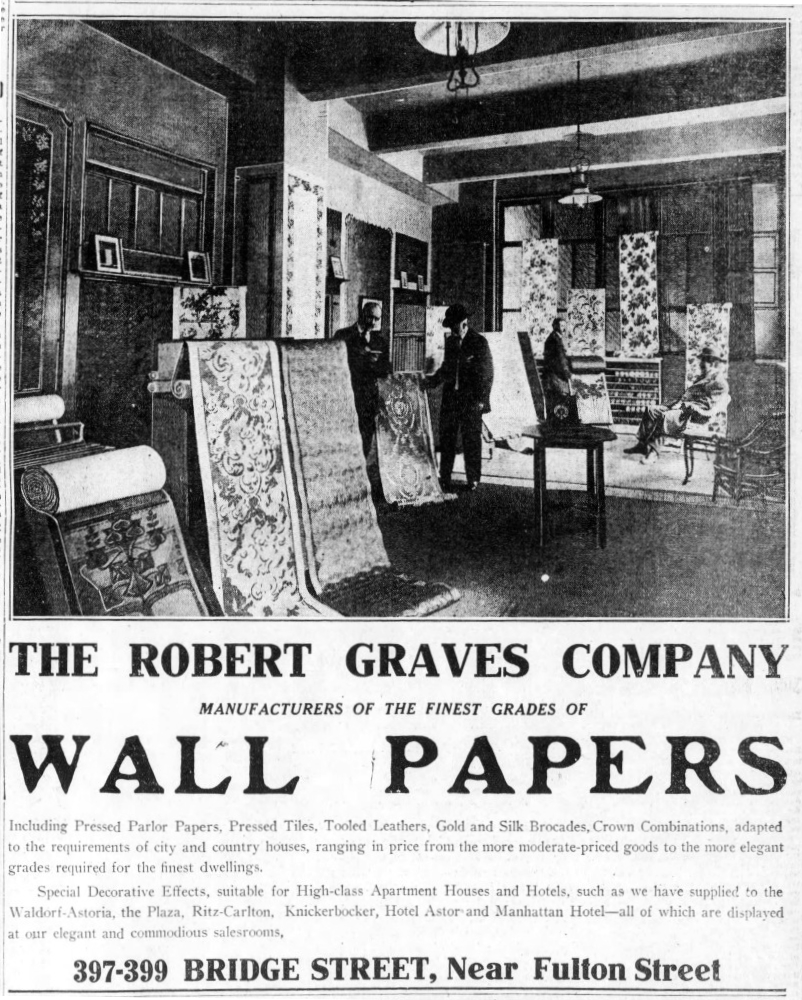
Advertisement for the Robert Graves Company, published in the Brooklyn Eagle 1911.
