= Les Pins =

- Commune
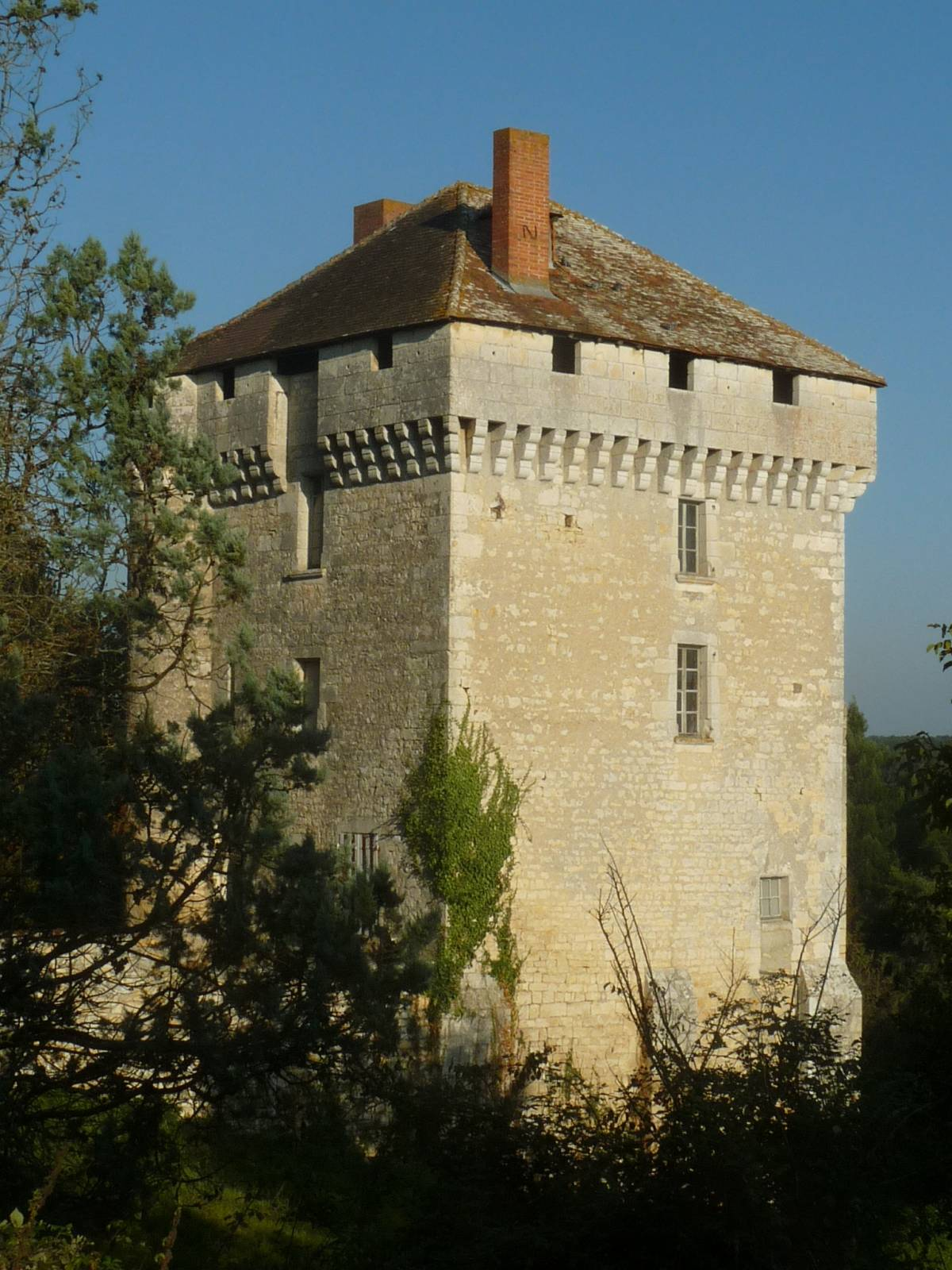
- Chateau
- Location of Les Pins
- Location within France Location within Nouvelle-Aquitaine
- Coordinates: 45°49′14″N 0°23′28″E
- Country: France
- Region: Nouvelle-Aquitaine
- Department: Charente
- Arrondissement: Confolens
- Canton: Charente-Bonnieure
- Intercommunality: Charente Limousine

Government
  - Mayor (2020–2026): Didier Sellier
- Area^{1}: 21.06 km^{2} (8.13 sq mi)
- Elevation: 123 m (404 ft)
- Highest elevation: 137 m (449 ft)
- Lowest elevation: 72 m (236 ft)
- Population (2023): 506
  - Density: 24.0/km^{2} (62.2/sq mi)
- Time zone: UTC+01:00 (CET)
  - Summer (DST): UTC+02:00 (CEST)
- INSEE/Postal code: 16261 /16260
- ^{1} French Land Register data, which excludes lakes, ponds, glaciers > 1 km^{2} (0.386 sq mi or 247 acres) and river estuaries.

Les Pins (French pronunciation: [le pɛ̃]; Occitan: Los Pins) is a commune in the Charente department in southwestern France.

== Population ==
Historical population
Year	Pop.	±% p.a.
1968	403	—
1975	413	+0.35%
1982	411	−0.07%
1990	359	−1.68%
1999	400	+1.21%
2007	434	+1.02%
2012	447	+0.59%
2017	462	+0.66%
2023	506	+1.53%
Source: INSEE

== See also ==
- Communes of the Charente department
