= Jourdan et Villard =

French wallpaper company

Jourdan et Villard was a French wallpaper company active in the early 19th century.

== History ==
The company exhibited at the 1806 Exposition Publique des Produits de L'industrie Française in Paris, where they received an honourable mention for their wallpapers.

== Wallpapers ==
Their best-known work was La Bataille d'Austerlitz, a large scenic wallpaper created circa 1827–1829 that depicted Napoleon at the Battle of Austerlitz. The 6.5 foot tall by 53 foot wide scenic wallpaper was created using over 2000 wood block prints on 30 panels. The work is included in the Deutsches Tapetenmuseum.
