= Marburger Tapetenfabrik =

- Company type: GmbH & Co. KG
- Industry: Manufacturer of carpet and wall coverings
- Founded: 1845
- Headquarters: Kirchhain, Germany
- Key people: Ullrich Eitel (Dipl. Engineer); Wolf Alexander Kappen
- Operating income: ▲85 million euros (2012)
- Number of employees: 365 (2013)
- Website: www.marburg.com

Marburger Tapetenfabrik is one of the oldest wallpaper manufacturers in Europe and sells its products under the “Marburg Wallcoverings” brand name. The Marburger Tapetenfabrik developed the first free-repeat pattern wallpapers, fabric and profile vinyl wallpapers as well as non-woven wallpaper.

== History ==
The Marburger Tapetenfabrik is very much a family-run business and is in its fifth generation of ownership. In 1845 Johann Bertram Schaefer started a business in Marburg which specialised in interior decor and began making wallpaper in 1879. The company was based in Marburg up until the beginning of the Second World War. Company headquarters have been located in Kirchhain since the 1950s. All wallpapers and wallcoverings are solely produced here.

The Marburger Tapetenfabrik makes over 4000 types of wallpaper. The collection mainly lies in the mid to upper price segment. The Marburger Tapetenfabrik produces the largest quantity of modern, non-woven wallpapers of all wallpaper manufacturers worldwide.

The Marburger Tapetenfabrik is also well known for its technology-based wall coverings which are able to block out x-rays and electro smog. This concept was further developed to create bug-proof wallpaper.

Marburg Wallcovering's products are exported to 80 countries. Outside of EU member states, the most important export countries are the United States, Russia and China. At the start of the new millennium, the Marburger Tapetenfabrik released the first Ulf Moritz wallpaper collection. This was followed by collections from Luigi Colani, Werner Berges, Karim Rashid and Zaha Hadid.

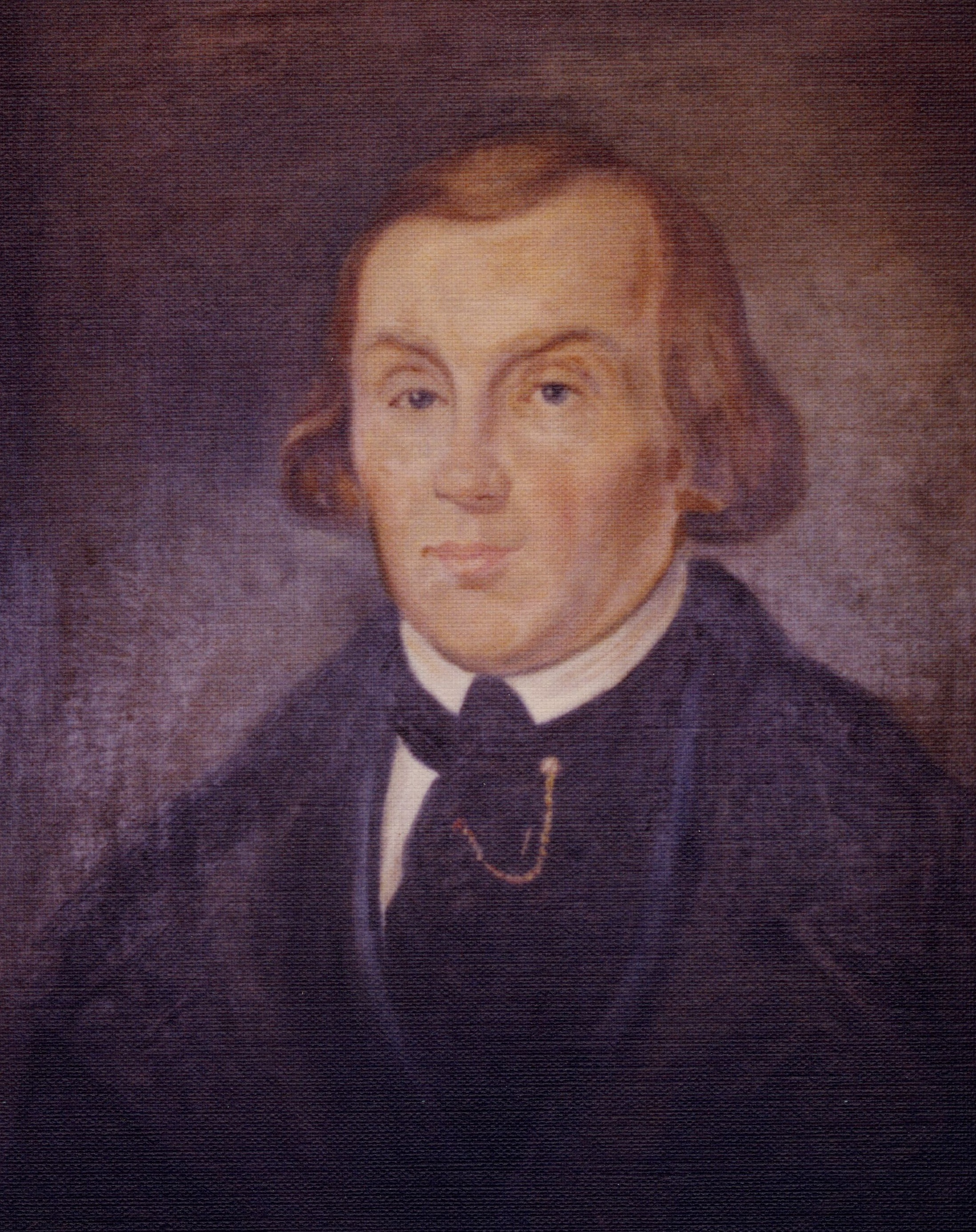
Johann Bertram Schaefer

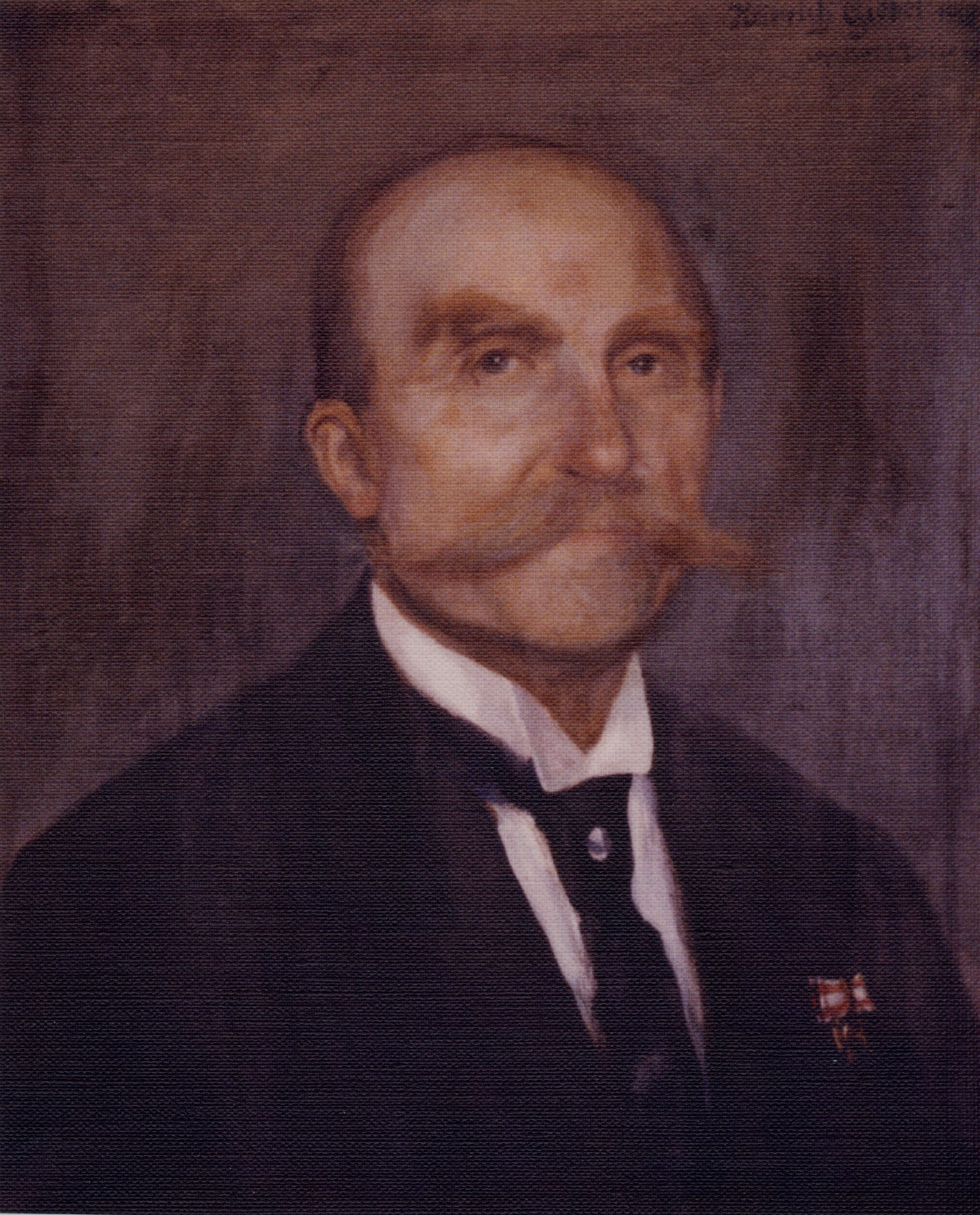
Johann Conrad Schaefer

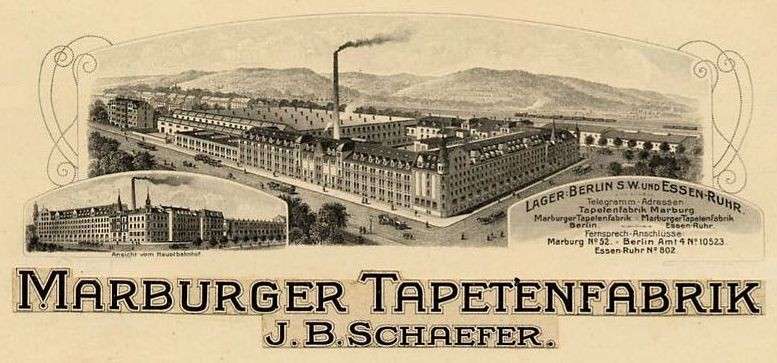
The Tapetenfabrik when it was still located in Marburg

== Environmental protection and sustainability ==
All Marburg wallpapers are produced in accordance with RAL-GZ-479 and have been since 1991. The RAL criteria were developed by the Association of German Wallpaper Manufacturers in an initiative led by the Marburger Tapetenfabrik.

One example of these standards can be seen in the company's thermal afterburn process which produces almost residue-free fumes. The Marburger Tapetenfabrik has also been using waste heat to generate warmth (closed substance cycle) since 1998. In addition to this, external specialists have been contracted for the removal of waste materials.

The Marburger Tapetenfabrik is the only wallpaper manufacturer since 1990 to be awarded the EN ISO 9001 (quality management) certification. Each year mandatory external audits evaluate whether the company should be allowed to retain this certification. Among the standards defined by EN ISO 9001 are ecological goals in terms of quality strategy and product development, the incorporation of ecological aspects into the manufacturing process and the promotion of an eco-friendly disposal method for waste materials.

== Innovations ==
1990	Patent – paintable textured decor on non-woven paper, first non-woven wall covering
1992	SuproNova – textured profile, without PVC or softener (patented)
1996	EMV shielding paper – liner paper for blocking electromagnetic fields, TÜV approved
2017	starLED – synthesis of wallpaper and light-emitting diodes

== Collaborations with artists and designers ==
1954	New Apartment – the first collection with small graphical patterns to appear after the Second World War (Prof. Hans Leistikow); New Form – first abstract fabric paper collection, Designed by Elsbeth Kupferoth
1972	X-art walls – wallpaper multiples by famous artists: Allen Jones, Niki de Saint Phalle, Jean Tinguely, Paul Wunderlich, Werner Berges
1997	Janosch – a collection for children's rooms by the famous children's author
2000	Ulf Moritz 1 – avant-garde design highlights; The Paper with the Mouse – children's room collection based on the TV series “The Programme with the Mouse”
2001	Felix – licensed collection for the series of children's books featuring the toy rabbit “Felix”
2001 onwards	Art Borders – artist editions by R. J. Anuszkiewicz, Ulf Moritz, Karim Rashid, Werner Berges Art, Luigi Colani, Zaha Hadid

== Awards ==
- 2004 – Hessen Champion ( Hesse Employers Association)
- 2005 – Großer Preis des Mittelstandes (Grand Prix for Medium-sized Enterprises) (Oskar-Patzelt Foundation)
- 2006 – Innovation prize awarded by architectural magazine AIT
- 2006 – Company of the Year (training/eurodecor 2007)
- 2007 – Großer Preis des Mittelstandes (Grand Prix for Medium-sized Enterprises) (Oskar-Patzelt Foundation)
- 2007 – Traineeship seal awarded by the GCIC, Northern Hesse
- 2009 – Großer Preis des Mittelstandes (Grand Prix for Medium-sized Enterprises) (Oskar-Patzelt Foundation)
- 2010 – Innovation prize awarded by architectural magazine AIT
- 2010 – Nominated for the German Design Prize 2011, Frankfurt am Main Exhibition/Design council
- 2012 – Decoration of Oskar-Patzelt Foundation
