= Defossé & Karth =

French wallpaper company

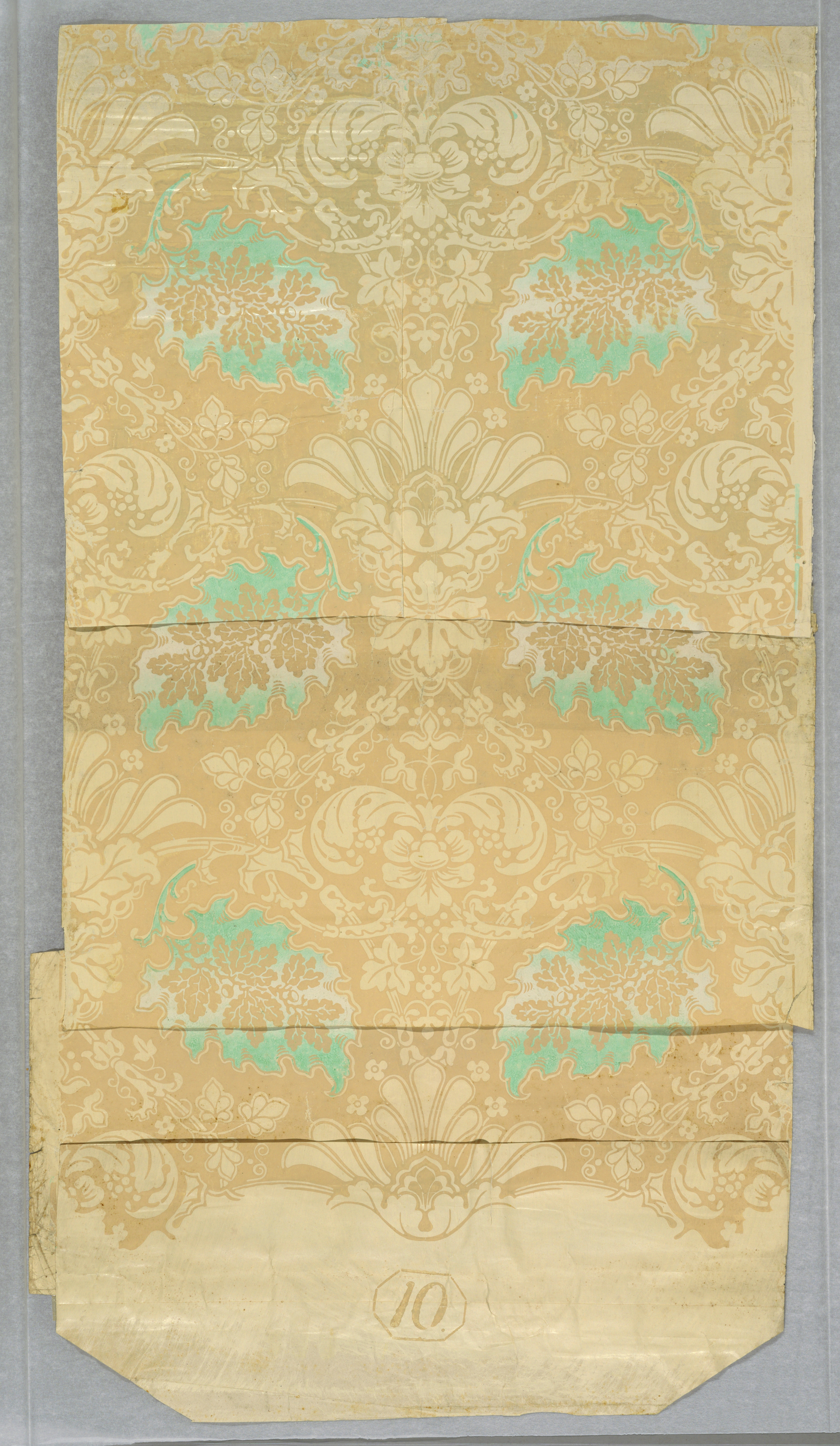
Sidewall (France), 1820–35, block-printed wallpaper on handmade paper

Defossé & Karth was a French wallpaper company. Established in Paris before the French Revolution, the firm produced numerous designs over many years. Their wallpaper was installed in both European and American houses, especially those in New England and the South.

== History ==
The design firm of Defossé and Karth was founded in 1851. Their decorative designs were inspired by the Barbizon School, in particular the works of the 18th century painter Jean-Baptiste Corot and the 19th century painter Jean-Francois Millet.

== Design work ==
Their most famous work is the Cupid and Psyche series of patterns, which was designed for Napoleon I and inspired by the drawings of the French painter, Jacques-Louis David. In 1928, Art Digest magazine describes this design as being "executed in lovely soft shades of grey". The review describes their scenic wallpaper as fashionable and in vogue with French furnishings of the 18th and 19th centuries.

Other well-known patterns were Old Paris, Gardens of Versailles, Scenes on the Seine, among others. Their design, L'Eden was exhibited in London in 1862, and was noted as a "technical achievement".

== Awards ==
In 1867, the firm received a gold medal for a large landscape wallpaper design produced in association with the German firm, Rommel of Berlin.

== Collections ==
Several samples of their work are included in the permanent collections of the Museum of Fine Arts Houston and the Yale University Art Gallery and the Cooper-Hewitt National Design Museum of the Smithsonian Institution.
