= Réveillon riots =

Riots occurred in April 1789 in Paris, during the French Revolution

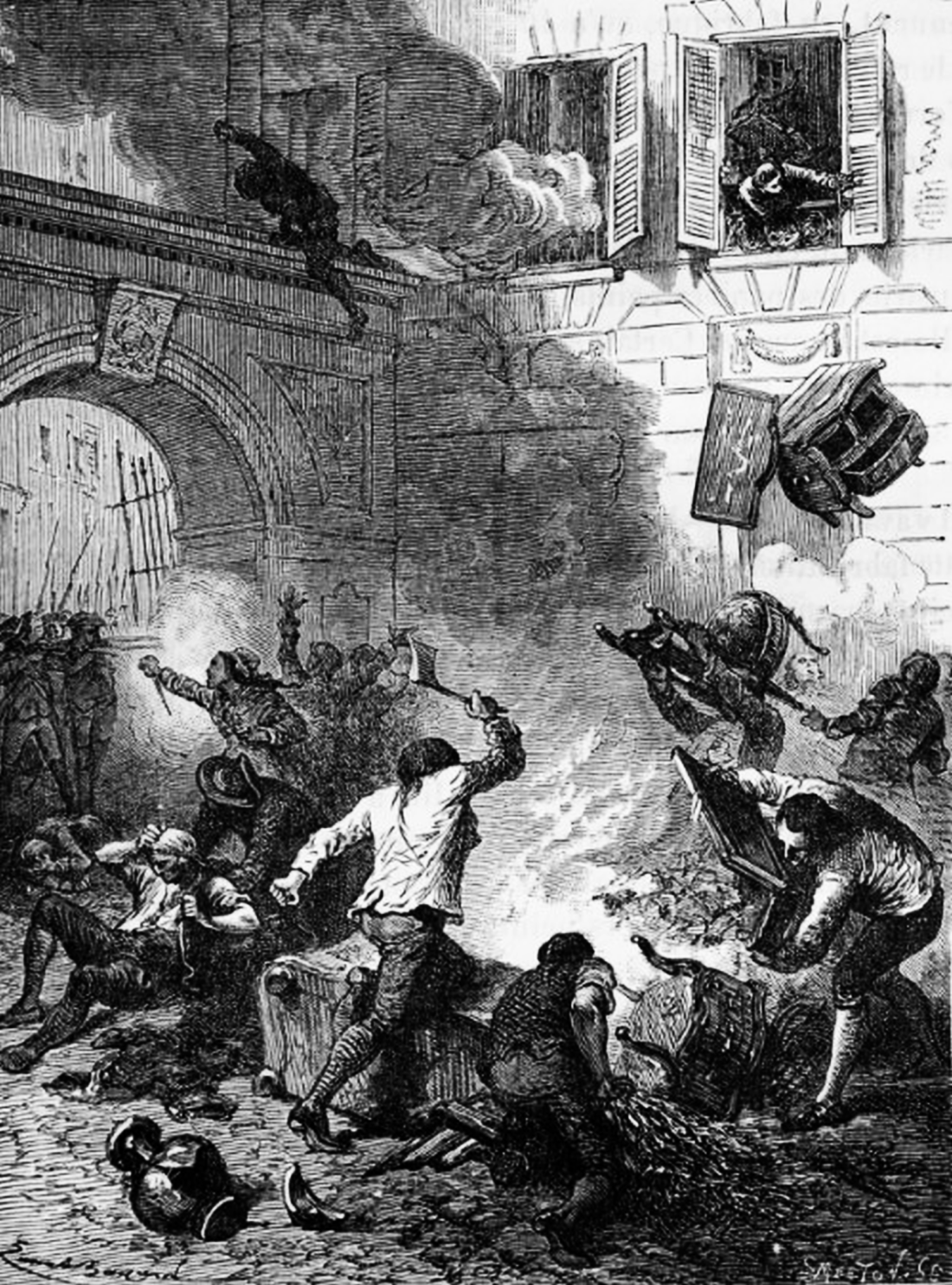
The looting of Jean-Baptiste Réveillon's mansion on April 27, 1789

The Réveillon riots between 26 and 29 April 1789 centered in the St. Antoine district of Paris where a factory which produced luxury wallpaper was owned by Jean-Baptiste Réveillon. The factory employed around 300 people.

Protests began after rumors spread that the owner had made a speech stating that his skilled worker ought to be paid less. In fact, these rumours were incorrect, instead Mr Réveillon had argued for a liberalisation of the French economy, which would lead to a lowering of prices and therefore lower wages. The rumors were highly inflammatory given the difficult winter of 1788, which caused food shortages and had exacerbated already high unemployment. However, nonetheless Réveillon was known for his benevolence towards the poor.

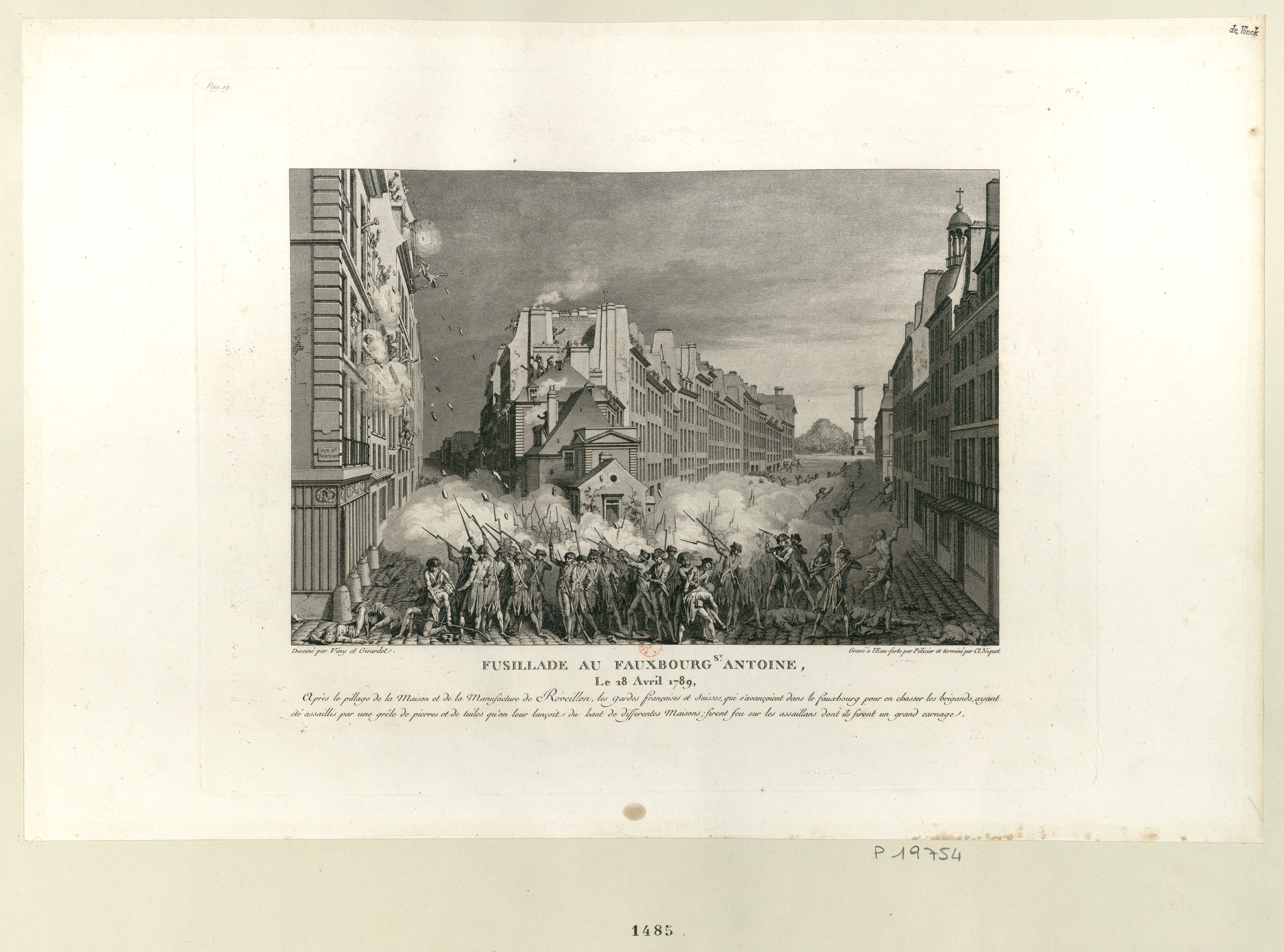
Shooting at the Faubourg Saint-Antoine, on 28 April 1789.

While the protesters did not manage to destroy the factory, which was being guarded by a group of around fifty troops, a factory owned by the saltpetre manufacturer Henriot was destroyed after he made similar comments. However Réveillon's factory was destroyed a day later as was his home. The riot killed 25 people.

The Marquis de Ferrières wrote an account of the Réveillon riots in which he described how five or six thousand workers attacking the home of Réveillon and another five or six hundred looting money and goods from passing carriages of the First and Second Estates.

== See also ==
- List of food riots
- Estates General of 1789
- Cahiers de doléances
