= Jeffrey & Co =

English producer of fine wallpapers

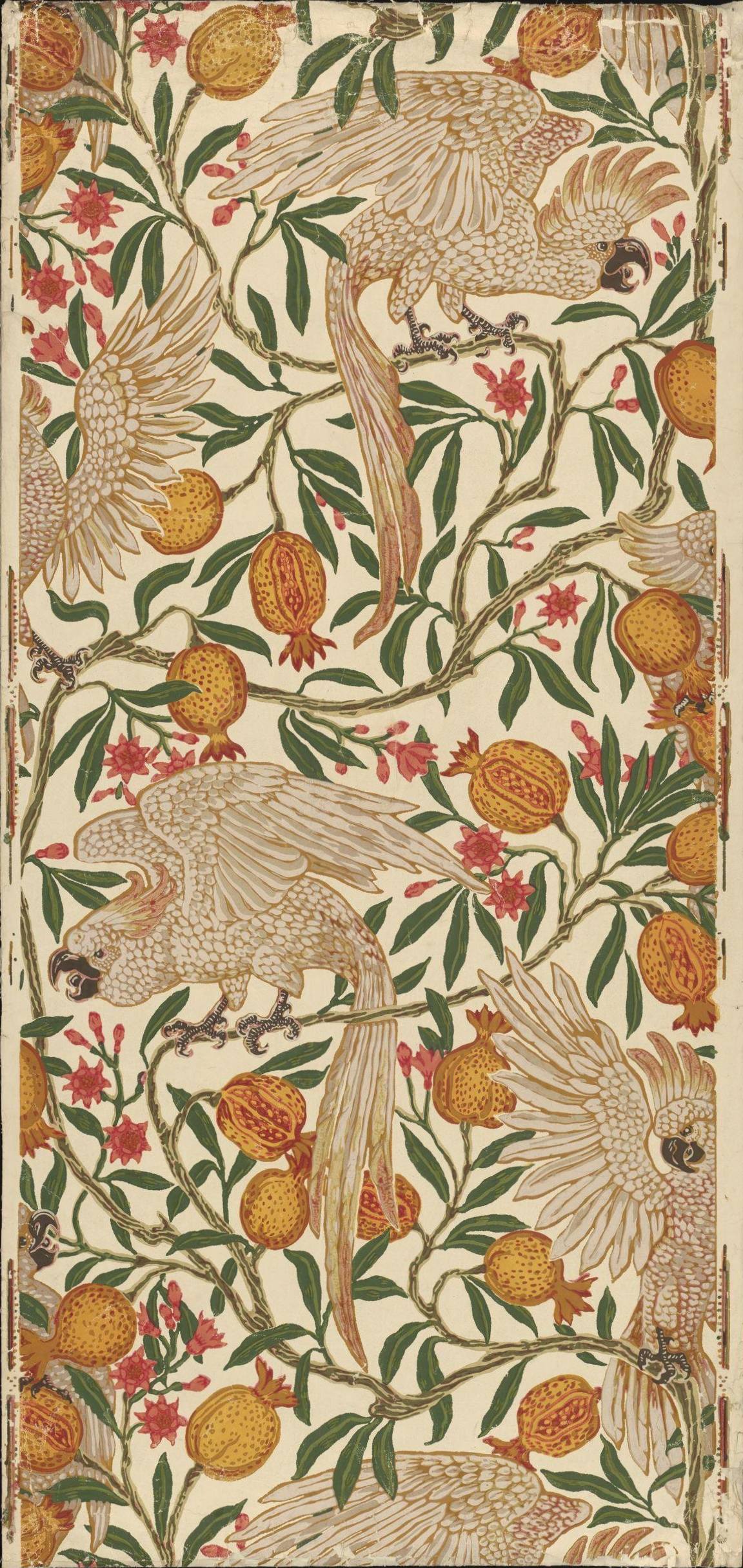
Cockatoo and Pomegranate wallpaper, designed by Walter Crane. Colour woodblock print on paper; Produced by Jeffrey & Co.; England in 1899.

Jeffrey & Co was an English producer of fine wallpapers that operated from 1836 to the 1930s.

== History ==
The company was founded in 1836 at 64 Essex Road in London, England.

From 1864 to 1896, the company was owned by Metford Warner.

The company produced papers based on designs by William Morris as early as 1864. In 1871, under Warner's direction, it began printing papers by designers such as Walter Crane, Lewis F. Day, Bruce J. Talbert and C. F. A. Voysey.

== Exhibitions and awards ==
IN 1851 the company exhibited at the Crystal Palace Exhibition in London. In 1878 the company received a gold medal at the Paris exhibition for their wallpaper Sunflowers, designed by Bruce J. Talbert.

== Collections ==
Historical examples of the papers produced by Jeffrey & Co are found in Museum of Fine Arts Houston the RISD Museum, the National Gallery of Victoria, Australia, and the Victoria and Albert Museum, London.
