= Jacquemart & Bérnard =

French wallpaper manufacturer

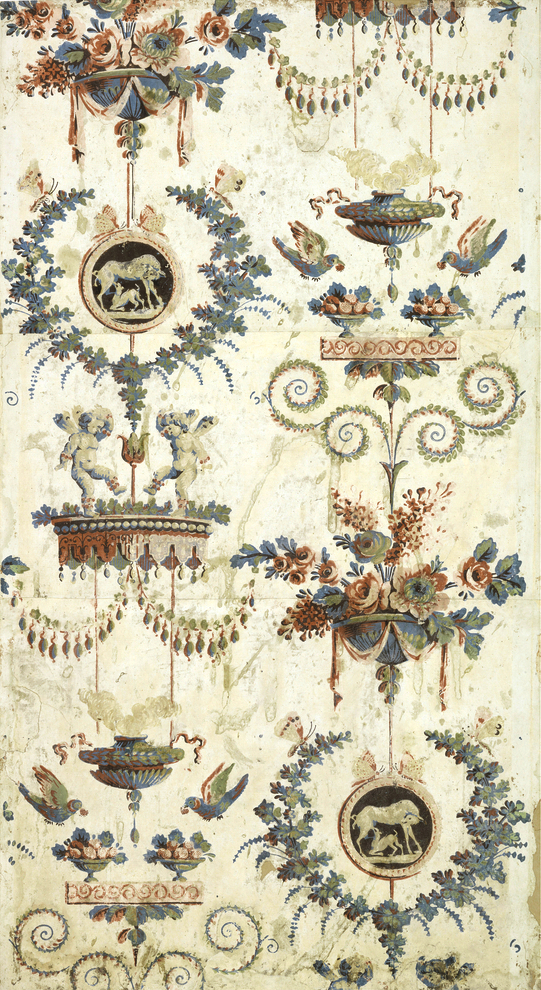
Wallpaper, ca. 1791. Produced by Jacquemart & Bénard (Paris, France), Block printed on handmade paper.

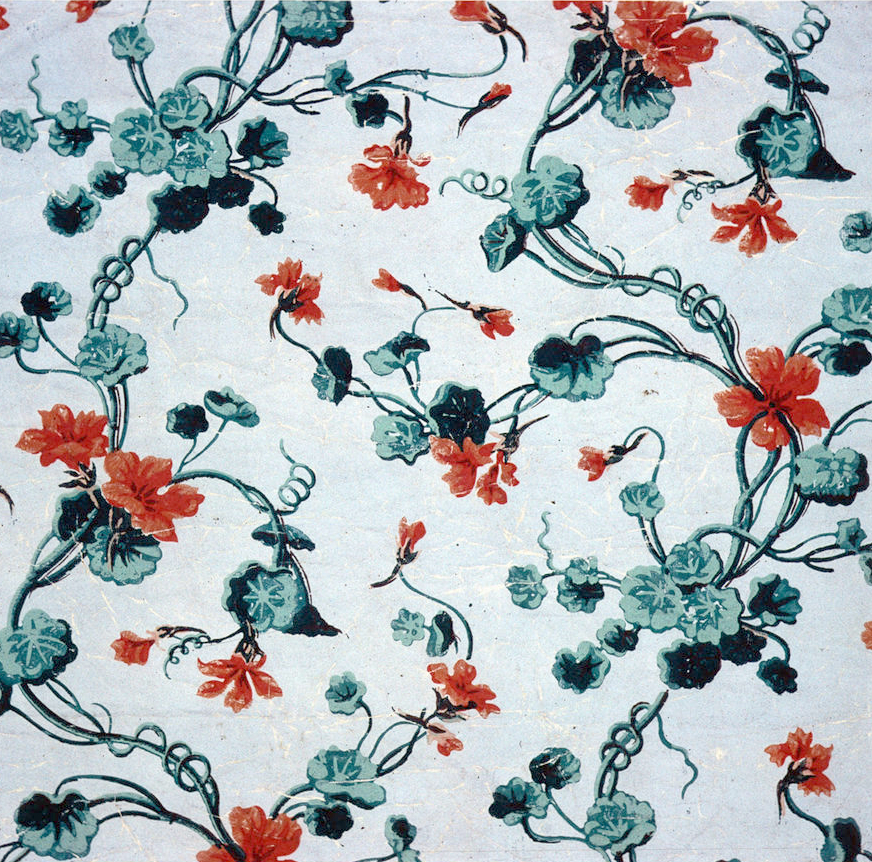
Wallpaper sample by Jacquemart & Bénard company, circa 1794–1797.

Jacquemart et Bénard was a French wallpaper manufacturer active from 1791 to 1840.

== History ==
Jacquemart et Bénard was founded in 1791 by Pierre Jacquemart and Eugène Balthasar Crescent Bénard de Moulinières. The company was the successor to the Parisian wallpaper manufacturer Réveillon. Following turmoil related to the French Revolution, Jean-Baptiste Réveillon transferred the operations of his company at 39, rue de Montreuil, Paris to Jacquemart & Bénard in 1791.

== Legacy ==
Examples of the company's wallpapers are included in the collections of the Metropolitan Museum of Art, New York, the Victoria and Albert Museum, London, and the Rhode Island School of Design. Richard Nixon's 1972 refurbishment of the White House Blue Room used antique Jacquemart et Bénard wallpaper that had been produced in 1800.

== Gallery ==
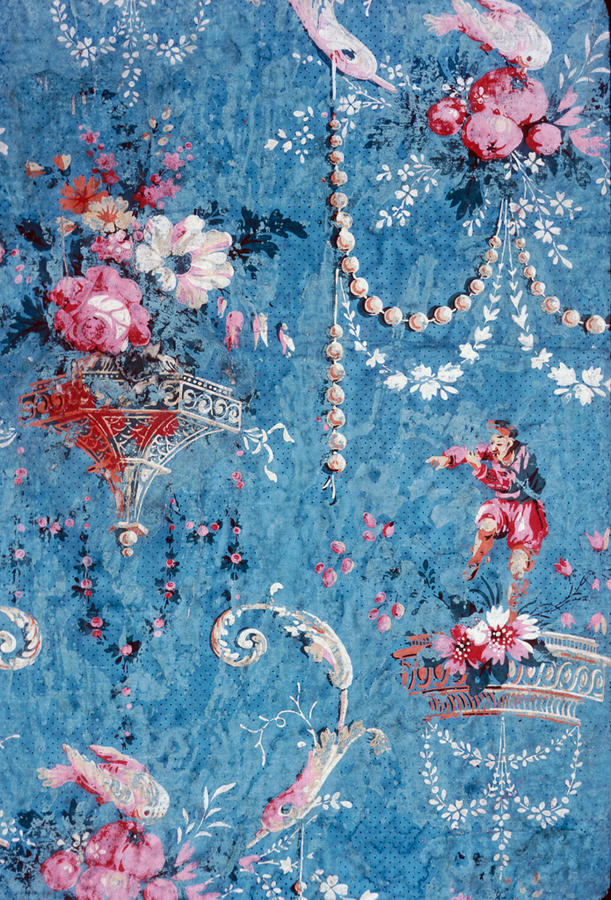
Wallpaper design attributed to Jacquemart et Bénard, circa 1795.

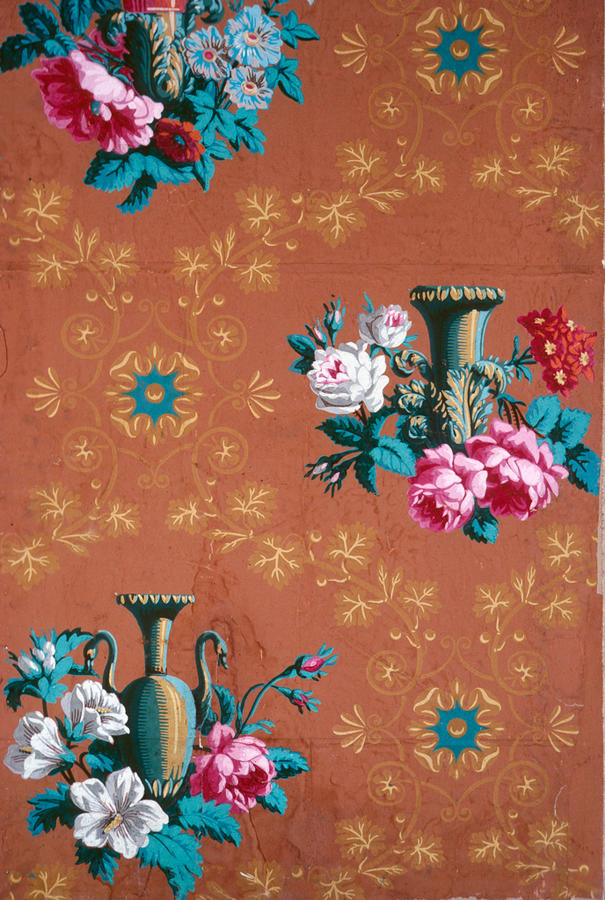
"Flowers and Ornaments" wallpaper design by Jacquemart et Bénard, 1802.

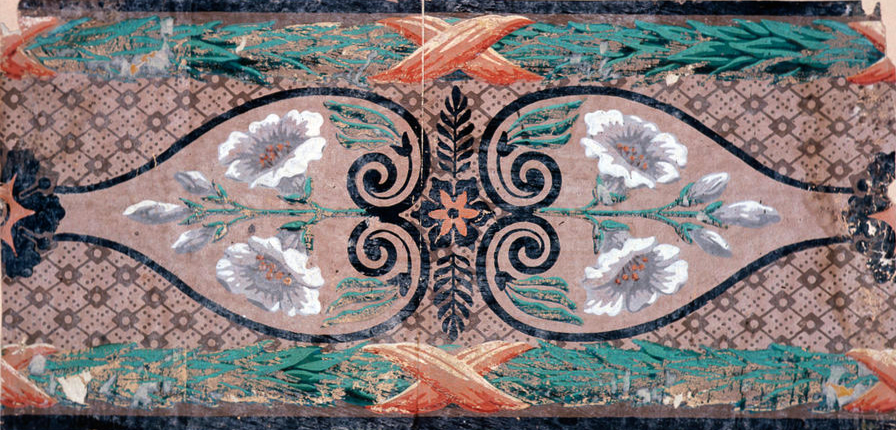
Wallpaper designed by Jacquemart et Bénard, 1802.

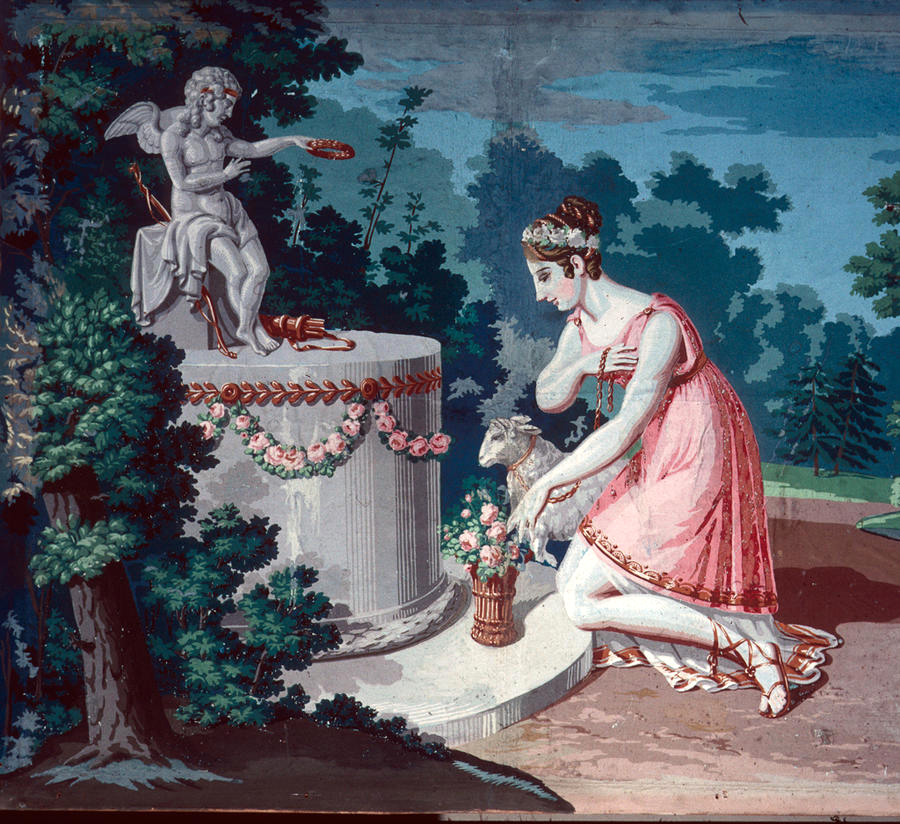
An Offering to Cupid, wallpaper design produced by Jacquemart et Bénard, Paris, 1800.
