= Jean-Baptiste Réveillon =

French wallpaper manufacturer (1725–1811)

Jean-Baptiste Réveillon (1725–1811) was a French wallpaper manufacturer. In 1789 Réveillon made a statement on the price of bread that was misinterpreted by the Parisian populace as advocating lower wages. He fled France after his home and his wallpaper factory were attacked and set on fire in what came to be known as the Reveillon riot. In 1791 he leased his business premises to the wallpaper manufacturer Jacquemart & Bérnard.

== Life ==
Réveillon apprenticed as a tradesman, haberdasher and stationer. In 1753 he began to import and hang flock wallpapers from England. At that time, wallpaper was becoming popular among the bourgeoisie as a creative and economical way to decorate interior spaces. During the Seven Years' War Reveillon started to produce wallpaper himself, marrying well and using his wife's dowry to produce velvet paper, pasted up into rolls and using vibrant colours, developed by Jean-Baptiste Pillement.

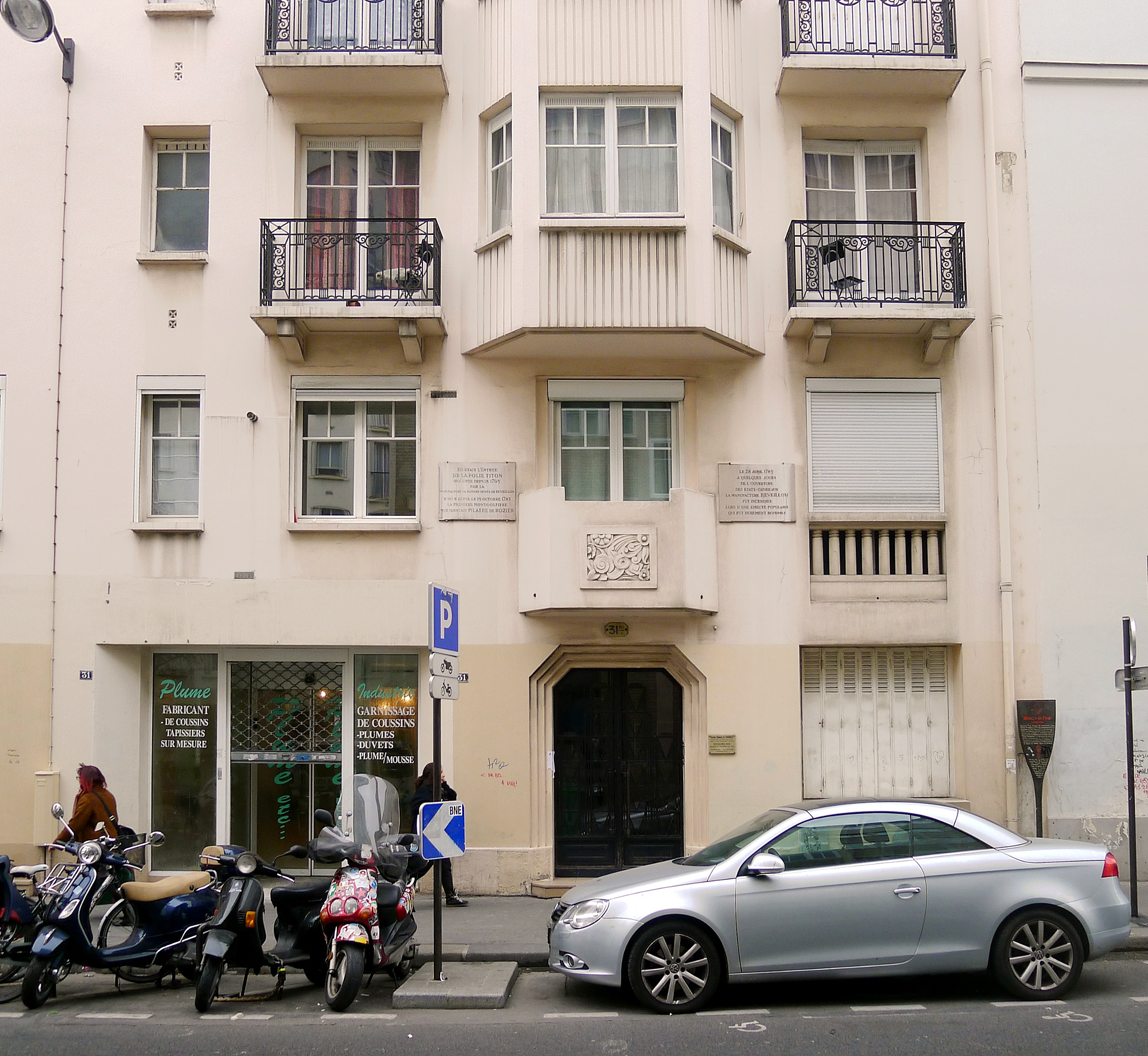
n°31bis, where the entrance of the former La Folie Titon was located.

In 1759 he moved to the Faubourg Saint-Antoine, then a neighbourhood dominated by the various crafts associated with furnishing. Réveillon launched production of a full range of wallpapers. The nobility began to patronize his business and in 1765—--already extremely wealthy--—he bought a mansion, with a parc and a theatre inside La Folie Titon, formerly owned by Évrard Titon du Tillet. Reveillon installed his wallpaper factory on the ground floor, retaining the upper floors for his private residence.

In 1775 Réveillon opened a paper mill to improve both the quantity and quality of his paper supply. In 1776 he opened a shop near the Tuileries. The papier bleu d'Angleterre became very popular when Queen Marie Antoinette decorated her apartments with them. Réveillon himself dabbled in chemistry enough to discover a new process for making vellum paper in 1782. The following year he was granted permission to use the title of Manufacture Royale.

== First Hot Air Balloon ==
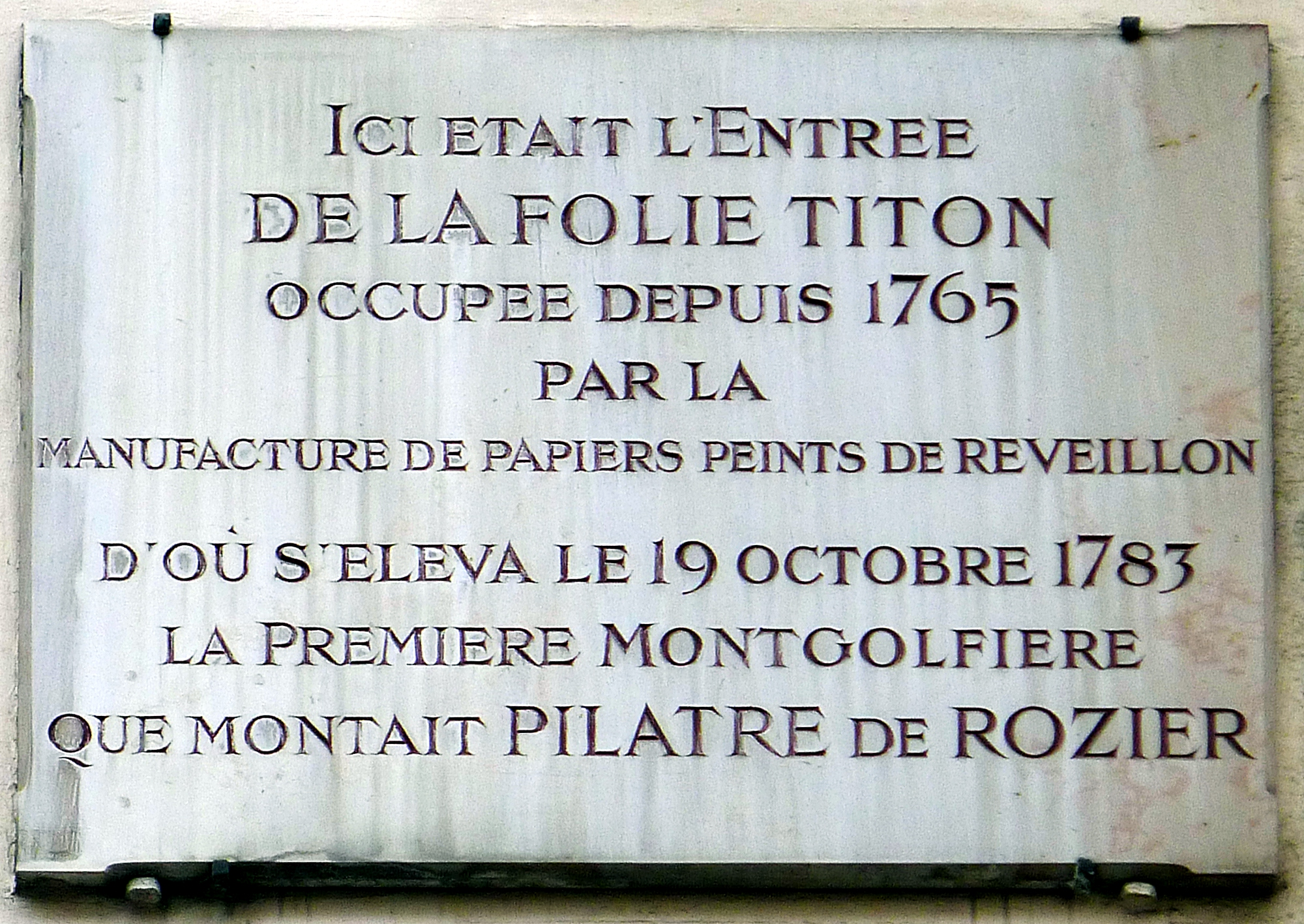
The commemorative plaque of the first hot-air balloon takeoff in 1783.

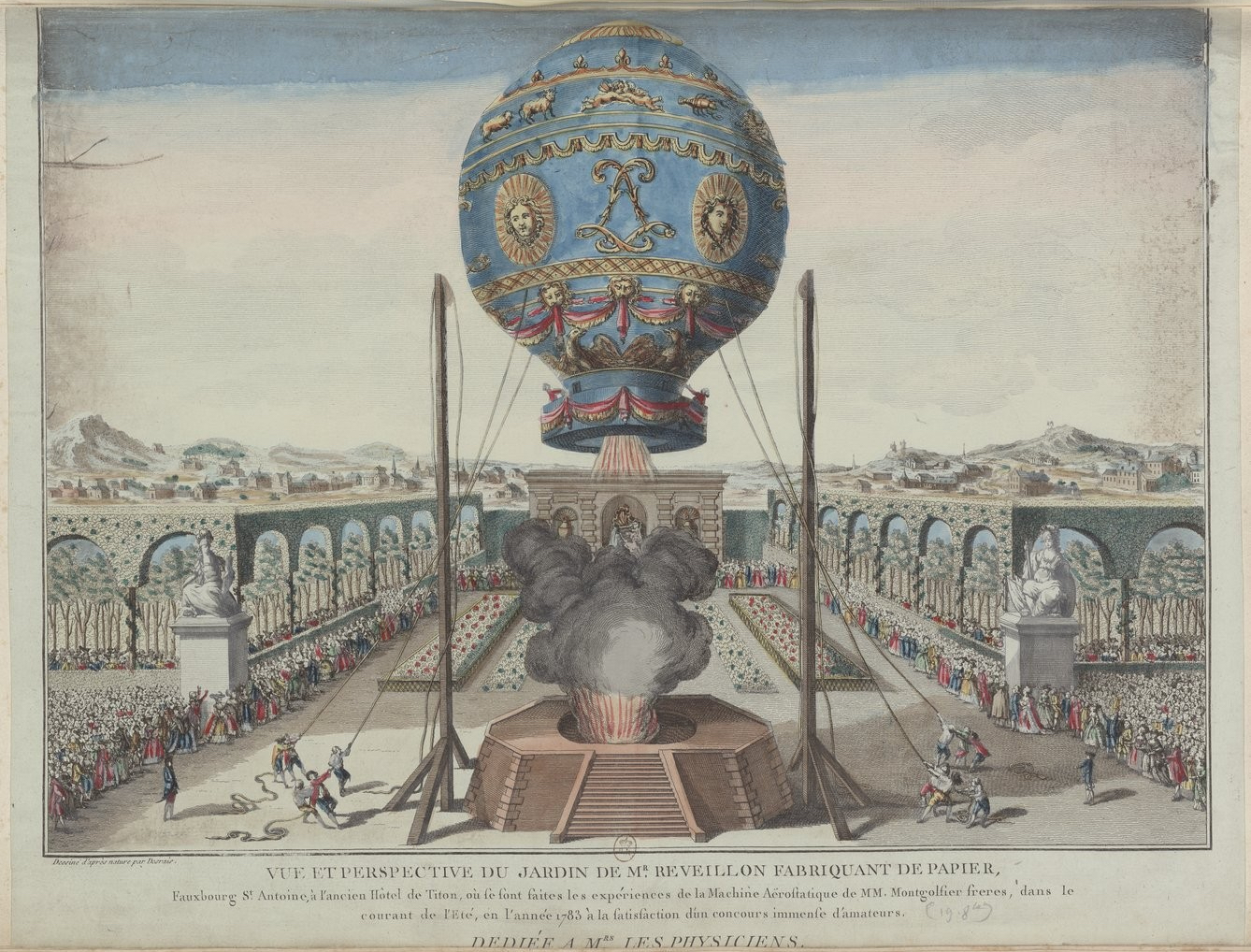
The launching of the balloon on 19 October 1783, engraving by Claude-Louis Desrais

His purchase of the paper mill and expertise in paper production brought him into contact with Etienne de Montgolfier, and it was from Réveillon's garden at La Folie Titon that the first hot-air balloon was launched on 12 September 1783. Réveillon delivered a special and colourful wallpaper, used as a cover for the balloon. A second balloon, called Le Réveillon, with a rooster, a duck and a sheep was launched a week later at Versailles. On 19 October his employee André Giroud de Villette and Jean-François Pilâtre de Rozier went into the sky, as pioneers of flight.

== French Revolution ==
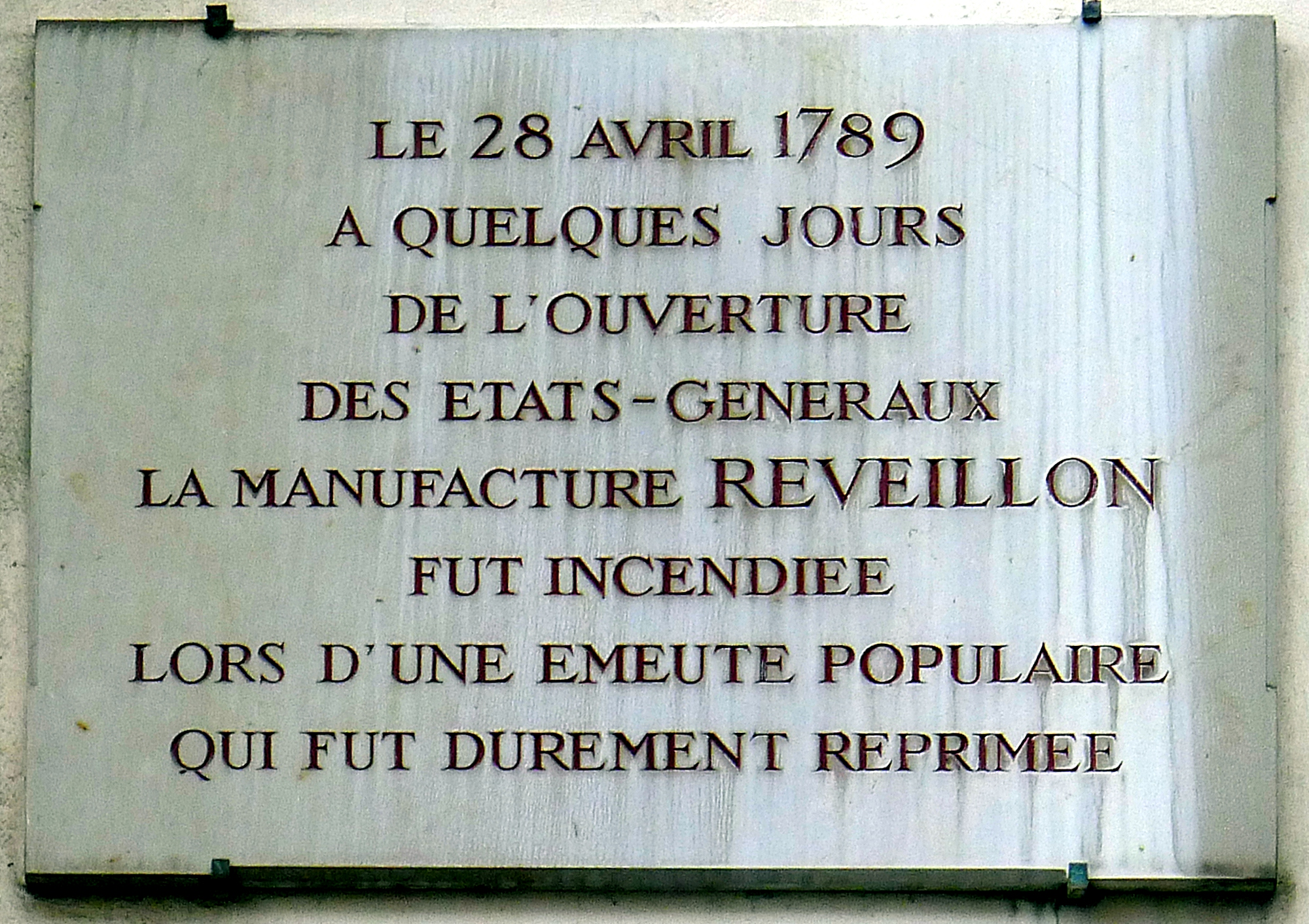
The plaque commemorating the riots of April 1789, just before the French Revolution.

In the year 1789 Réveillon was the casualty of his own reflections on modern economics. "Since bread was the foundation of our national economy," he stated in an essay, "its distribution should be deregulated, permitting lower prices. That in turn would allow lower wage costs, lower manufacturing prices and brisk consumption." This musing was misinterpreted by an already angry Parisian populace, who believed that Monseigneur Reveillon was advocating a lowering in wages. On 28 April 1789 his mansion was attacked and looted by an angry mob, all the wallpaper, glue, furniture and paintings were burned. His wine cellar, containing 2,000 bottles of wine, was pillaged and quickly consumed by the riotous mob. Réveillon and his family escaped by climbing a wall and fleeing to the nearby Bastille. It was a bloody day, some say 25 people dying in the ensuing melee. The rioters were eventually dispersed in an opening episode of the French Revolution. Today plaques mark the site of the Reveillon riot.

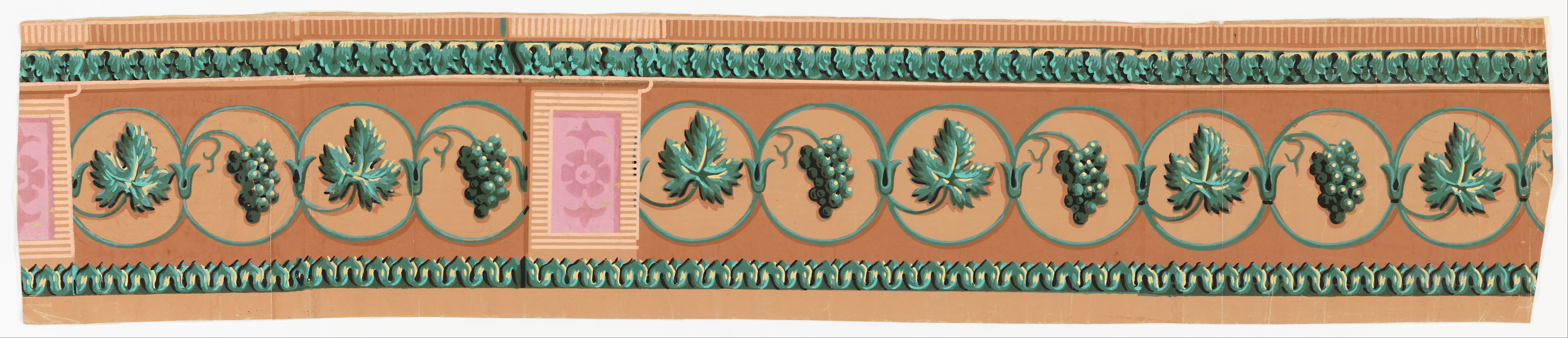
Jacquemart & Bérnard - Border

Réveillon emigrated to England with his fortune intact, and after the French Revolution, leased his manufacture to Jacquemart & Bérnard, who continued to produce wallpaper till 1840.

== Sources ==
- Leonard N. Rosenband, "Jean-Baptiste Réveillon: A Man on the Make in Old Regime France," French Historical Studies, 20, 1997, 481-510.
- Christine Velut, "L'industrie dans la ville: les fabriques de papiers peints du faubourg Saint-Antoine (1750-1820)," Revue d'histoire moderne et contemporaine, 49e, 2002, 115-137.
