= LED wallpaper =

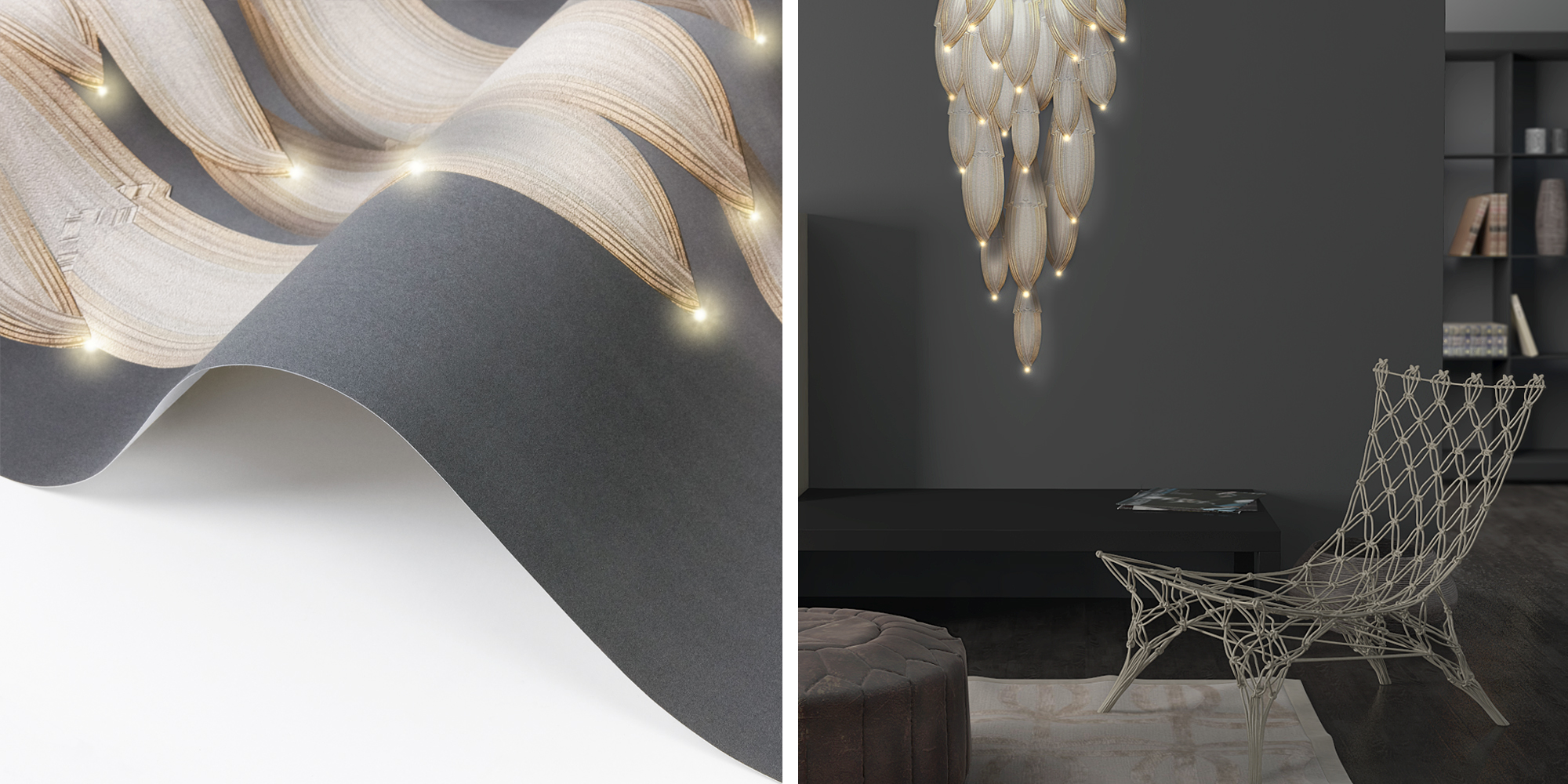
LED wallpaper

LED wallpaper is the integration of light-emitting diodes into flat substrates suitable to be applied to walls for interior decoration purposes.

The experimentation on the combination of light sources and wall covering surfaces has been largely fostered by the progressive miniaturisation of low-voltage lighting technology, such as LEDs and OLEDs, suitable to be incorporated into low-thickness materials to be applied onto interior walls. The new possibilities offered by these developments have prompted some designers and companies to research and develop proprietary LED wallpaper technologies, some of which are currently available for commercial purchase. Other solutions mainly exist as prototypes or are in the process of being further refined.

The first use of the term LED wallpaper is found in the book Wallpaper by Lachlan Blackley, describing the work of textile designer Maria Yaschuk, who designed a flexible solution to incorporate LEDs into digitally printed wall covering material in 2004. This definition is currently used by companies such as Meystyle and designer Ingo Maurer in relation to LED wall covering materials included in their catalogues. Other similar concepts are light-emitting wallpaper used by Lomox and luminous textile used by Philips.

== Meystyle ==
Meystyle claim to have been the first company to integrate light-emitting diodes into wallpaper so that it can be hung like a traditional wall covering. Maria Yaschuk, co-founder of the company together with sister Ekaterina Yaschuk, presented the first prototype of LED wallpaper as part of her graduation project for the MA degree in Textile Futures at CSM in 2004. The concept was successively developed with her sister Ekaterina into a series of designs exhibited in 2007 under the name Wire Geometrics at the National Glass Centre in Sunderland. The same year Maria and Ekaterina went on to commercialise their product under the company name Meystyle LED Wallpaper & Fabric. Meystyle uses digital printing to transfer their designs on a variety of non-woven substrates suitable for wall covering. The LEDs are then incorporated by hand with a special technique that avoids adding any thickness to the material. Meystyle claim their LED wallpaper can be hung like any standard wall covering with the additional requirement of a power socket or a light switch.

== Living Wall by High-Low Tech ==
Living Wall is a project developed by MIT Media Lab research group High-Low Tech in 2009 as an experiment on interactive wallpaper that can be programmed to monitor its environment, control lighting and sound, and generally serve as an unobtrusive way to enrich environments. The wallpaper is flat, made entirely from paper and paint and is paired with a computing kit whose pieces can be customized with all manner of sensors, LED lamps, network interfaces, and interactive embellishments. The designers claim the pieces can be controlled by running the hand across the surface of the wallpaper. The Living Wall project was displayed at the Fuller Craft Museum in Brockton, Massachusetts from June to September 2010 as part of the exhibition New Materiality: Digital Dialogues at the Boundaries of Contemporary Craft.

== LOMOX ==
In early 2010 the Carbon Trust awarded a £454,000 grant to Welsh company LOMOX to develop a light emitting wallpaper using an ultra-efficient organic LED (OLED) technology that can be used as an even natural-looking light source for interior spaces in place of the more energy-demanding traditional lighting systems. The new technology was due for commercial release in 2012.

== Ingo Maurer and Team ==
Together with Meystyle's, Ingo Maurer's LED wallpaper is the only one currently available for commercial purchase. The LED wallpaper was designed by Ingo Maurer in partnership with Architects Paper in 2011 and is produced and distributed by Architects Paper. Maurer's wallpaper presents itself as a large electronic circuit board printed on paper and can be affixed to the wall with normal wallpaper adhesive. The conducting paths printed on the matte non-woven substrate become part of the design, on top of which are distributed white, red and blue LEDs. The red and blue diodes form optical cuboids with the white lights loosely and irregularly spread around them. The LEDs are controlled by a series of connection units which enables the individual regulation of the colours and the degrees of brightness of the LEDs. Silver-coloured skirting boards join the wallpaper to the floor and hide the technical equipment behind them.

== Philips ==
In 2011 Philips announced a partnership with Kvadrat Soft Cells to create a luminous textile which would combine Philips' experience in LED-based ambient lighting with Kvadrat Soft Cells' sound-absorbing textiles. The aim of the project is to enhance interior space through light and texture making full use of the broad spectrum of colours in Philips’ LED range. The textile is held in place with a lightweight aluminum frame that keeps it taut with the right amount of surface tension. The LED lights can be customised in a wide palette of colours that allow the final user to change the mood of the room whenever desired.

== Alternative light-emitting wall covering solutions ==
There are some other examples of wall covering developments aimed at incorporating light-emitting technologies onto the surface of the walls that do not necessarily make use of light-emitting diodes.

In 2007 Dutch designer Jonas Samson created a wall covering system with integrated lighting. The product appears to be regular wallpaper when the light is off and when illuminated can display light in any pattern or design. The design enables a room to be lit entirely by the walls. Turning the wallpaper on can be performed as a single action or can be set up in an elaborate sequence to make a space more dynamic and engaging. The designer has used phosphorescent pigments, transparent layers and a light switch to create a patterned wall with a botanical print powered by external light sources.

In 2008 Swedish designer Camilla Diedrich created a line of luminescent wallpaper that is lit by fiber optics. The line is called Nature Ray Charles Wallpaper and consists of an assortment of floral motifs in eight colour variations. The floral patterns are made with the fiber optic itself and produce a soft energy-efficient ambient light.

In 2012 Brooklyn-based design company Flat Vernacular launched a line of wallpaper that can glow in the dark. Each glowing paper is printed using glow in the dark ink. The inks get charged by typical room lighting or sunlight and release a soft glow when the lights are turned off.

In 2012, designer Debra Courtenay launched a project on the invention platform Quirky called Wallbrights. The concept combines the idea of LED wallpaper and customisable wall decal and consists of a series of individual hexagonal shapes containing an RGB LED light with an adhesive backing that can be easily attached to the wall. The LED hexagonal decals can be composed into different patterns and shapes. Each component needs to be continuously connected to an adjacent one through their male/female connectors. The whole configuration can then be powered through a wall socket. The brightness and the colour of the lighting scheme can be adjusted through a mobile app that communicates with the units via Bluetooth.
