= Bradbury & Bradbury =

American wallpaper company based in Benicia, California

Bradbury & Bradbury Art Wallpapers is an American company based in Sacramento, California, that specializes in the production and sale of vintage-inspired 19th- and 20th-century wallpaper, often reinterpreted with contemporary color palettes.

The company was founded in 1979 by Bruce Bradbury, who was the only employee with the surname "Bradbury" despite the double name of the company. The additional "Bradbury" was in tribute to his parents who encouraged and supported his endeavors.

In June 2023, a Victorian mansion in Escondido, California underwent a $3 million renovation, which included $400,000 worth of Bradbury wallpaper.
