= Jean-Gabriel Charvet =

French painter (1750–1829)

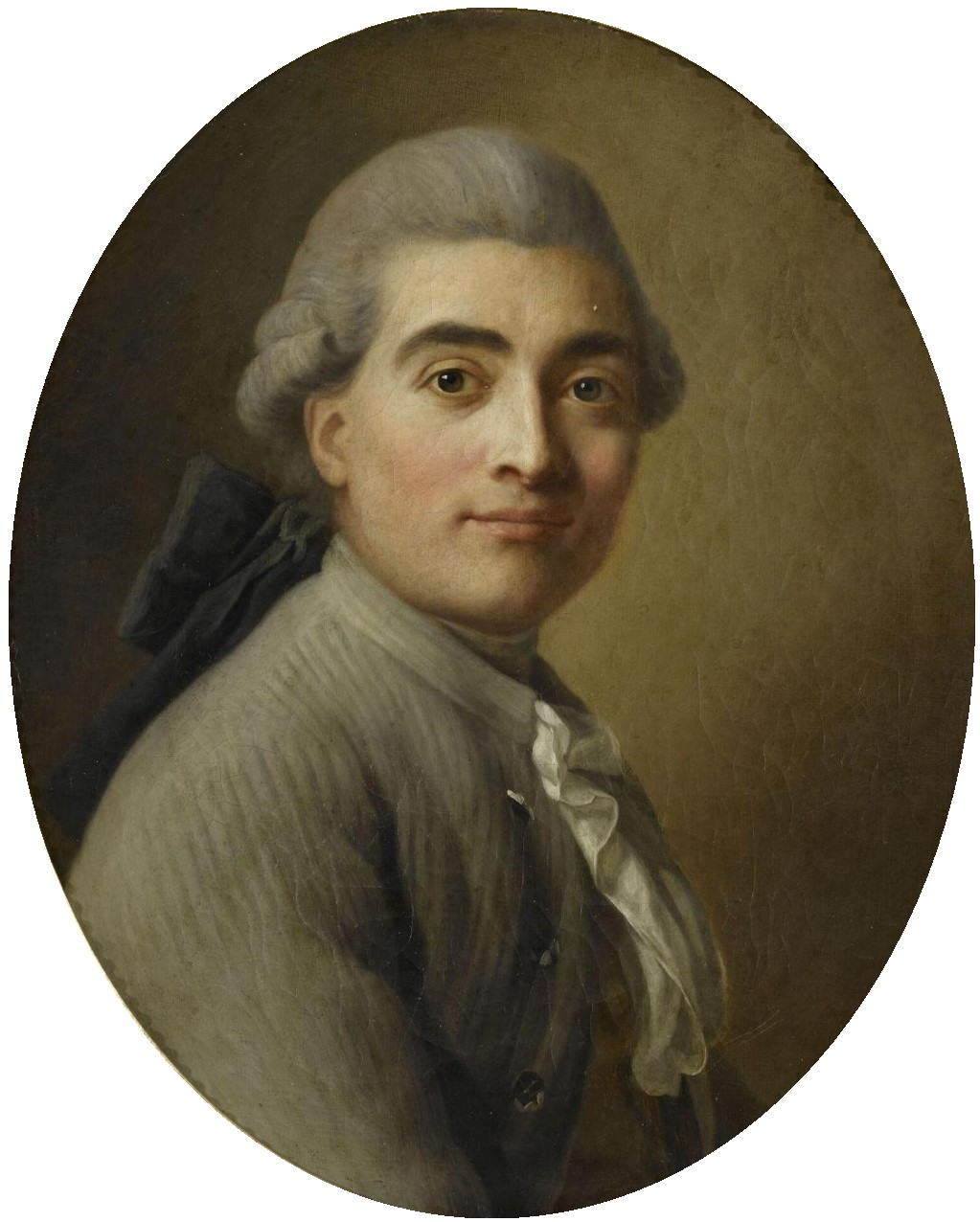
Portrait by Donat Nonnotte, c. 1765

Jean-Gabriel Charvet (French: [ʒɑ̃ ɡabʁijɛl ʃaʁvɛ]; 1750–1829), also known as Jean Gabriel Charvet, was a French painter, designer and draftsman.

Charvet's reputation rests on twenty-panels of scenic wallpaper titled Sauvages de la Mer Pacifique (The Savages of the South Pacific) which combine to form a neoclassical depiction of the explorations of Captain James Cook. The wallpaper was shown in Paris at the Exposition des produits de I’industrie francaise in 1806. Charvet died in Tournon-sur-Rhône, France in 1829.

== Biography ==
He was born in Serrières, Ardèche, France. He studied at the École de Dessin in Lyon under the French artist Donat Nonnotte (1708–1785) and worked as a designer for the French wallpaper manufacturer Joseph Dufour et Cie (1752–1827) of Mâcon, France. In 1773, Charvet travelled to Guadeloupe in the Caribbean on business for his uncle, and stayed for four years producing many studies of native flora and fauna, as well as landscapes. By 1785, he had established a drawing school in Annonay, south of Lyon. Annonay had been a papermaking region since the Sixteenth Century.

== Les Sauvages de la Mer Pacifique ==
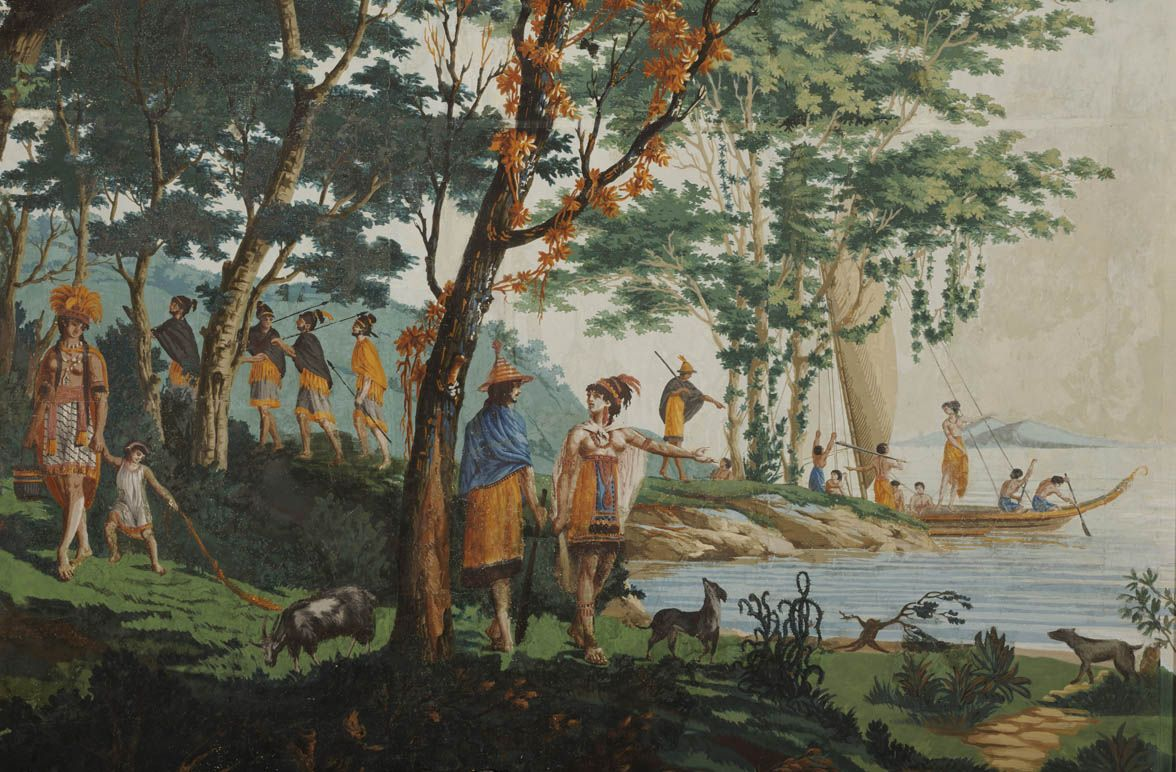
An example of the complex design and layering of printed colours in Les Sauvages de la Mer Pacifique. Detail from panel 12 of Les Sauvages depicting inhabitants of the Straits of Prince William, now known as the Gulf of Alaska.

=== Historical Context: Panoramic Wallpaper Production ===
Les Sauvages de la Mer Pacifique (Les Sauvages) is a scenic panoramic wallpaper designed by Jean-Gabriel Charvet and produced by Joseph Dufour et Cie between 1804 and 1805 in Mâcon, France. Les Sauvages was one of the first panoramic wallpapers ever produced, premiering at the French Industrial Exposition in 1806. As such, the judge Jean-Baptiste de Nompère de Champagny noted that it was unusual in style and medium describing it as, “perhaps the most curious example of this art”. It was one of the largest panoramic wallpapers produced at this time, consisting of twenty panels and measuring over ten meters in length and over two meters high. Endless paper was not available on a commercial scale until 1810, therefore, the large panels were made from handmade linen rag paper which was joined at the edges. A light blue water-based ground was applied to the paper before the woodblocks printed the design using vivid colour pigments like green verditer and Prussian blue. Designs for each shade of colour were carved from separate blocks and printed in layers in order to achieve a detailed design and naturalistic depiction of light and shade. The conservation department at the National Gallery of Australia reported that up to seven different shades were used to achieve naturalistic gradients in skin tone in order to imitate depth of form.

=== Historical Context: Subject Matter ===
Les Sauvages depicts First Nation's people from throughout the Pacific set in a fictional tropical setting. The work was inspired by the exploration voyages of Captain James Cook between 1768 and 1779 and Jean François de La Pérouse in 1785. Following these expeditions, the Pacific captured the imagination of Europe and America and was the inspiration for literature, plays and images which reached a wide audience. Images produced by official voyage artists like John Webber were engraved and published, inspiring other exotic Pacific depictions like the Tableau des decouvertes du Capne. Cook & de la Perouse by Jacques Grasset de Saint-Sauveur. Similarities in the colour palette and figurative vignettes in Les Sauvages indicate that Saint-Sauveur's Tableau may have inspired the work. Primary sources, like the wallpaper's accompanying prospectus produced by Joseph Dufour in 1806, indicate that the subject of exploration and representations of the Pacific were very popular with a nineteenth century audience. The interest was encouraged by Enlightenment philosopher Jean-Jacques Rousseau’s notion of the noble savage and the Pacific as a moral utopian civilization. Les Sauvages perpetuates Rousseau’s stereotype, depicting homogenized races, living in harmony and peace. Les Sauvages also demonstrates another contradictory Enlightenment ideal of pride in man’s scientific innovations, indicated by the celebration of exploration. The depiction of the Pacific seen in Les Sauvages is typical of the period, celebrating progress and innovation as well as a nostalgia for an imagined utopian past.

During the early nineteenth century there was a revival of the artistic style and ideals of the classical world, spurred by the excavation of sites like Pompeii in 1748 which uncovered stylised frescoes, mosaics and sculptures. Les Sauvages demonstrates this influence through its neoclassical style. This style can be seen in the illusion of depth created by the use of lighter shades of colour in the background, the balanced composition and the figures appearing rounded and flesh-like. The work imitates the natural world through the use of chiaroscuro, illustrating a light source which naturally illuminates and shadows the figures, fauna and the landscape.

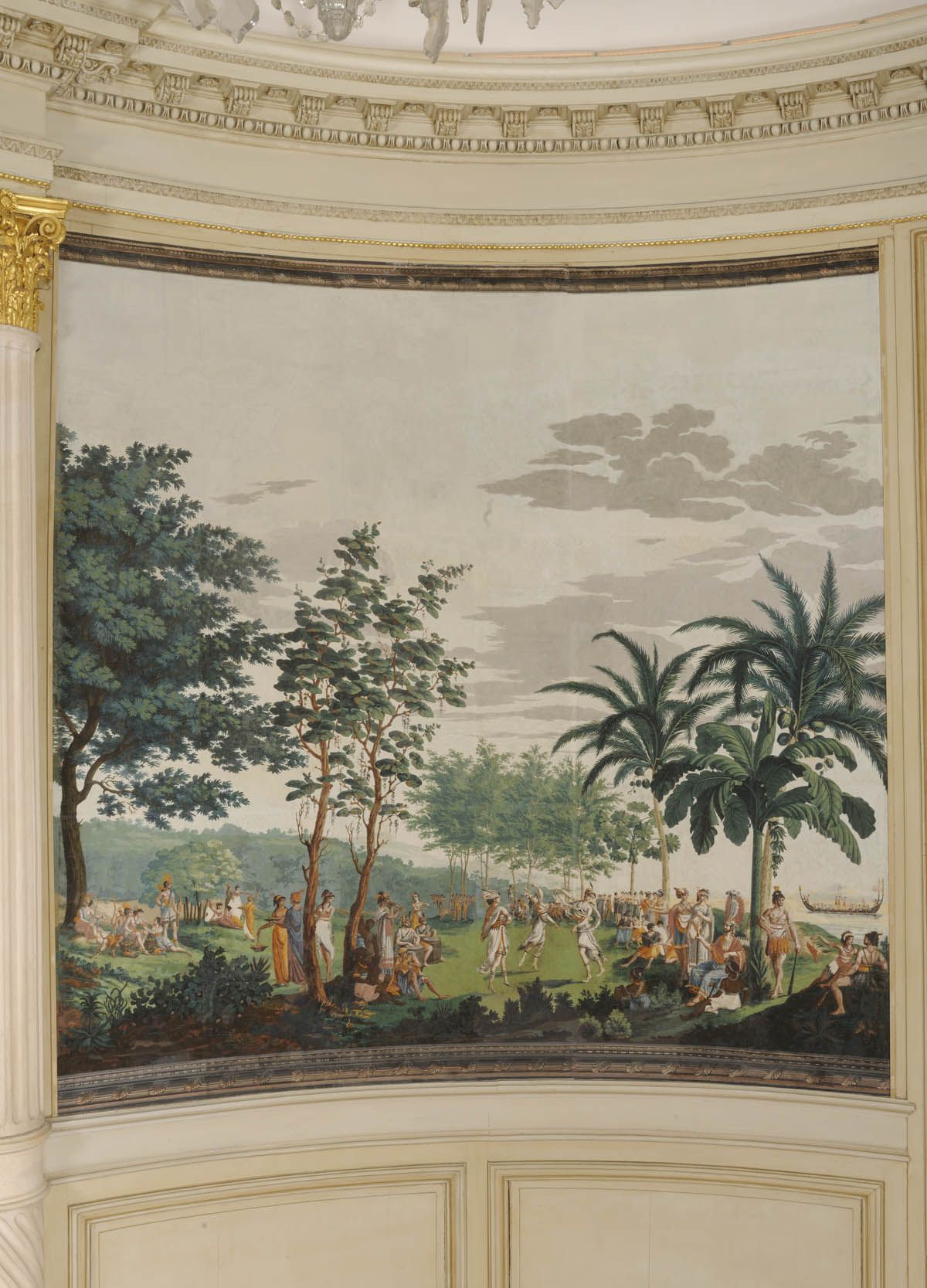
Les Sauvages de la Mer Pacifique was installed by the Francois-Emmanuel, vicomte de Toulongeon in 1804 in the parlour of his French Chateau which is now the Musée departmental d’arts et traditions populaires, Champlitte Haute Saone.

=== Purpose and Popularity ===
Within Dufour’s prospectus, he articulates that the aim of the wallpaper was to provide aesthetic pleasure and education. Dufour notes that “without leaving his apartment, a studious man reading the history of the voyages… might think himself… in the presence of the depicted people”. This suggested value of education and self-improvement paired with commercial availability indicate that the intended clientele of Les Sauvages was middle class. Notably, the development of panoramic wallpaper was cheaper to produce and install than custom made tapestries or murals and thus was a more accessible form of wall decoration. Additionally, the Pacific motif was extremely popular and appealed to the fashions and philosophies of the time. Despite pedagogical intentions, it is clear from the neoclassical costumes, generalised setting and homogenized racial cultures that this wallpaper was developed to “please the eye” more than to convey an accurate depiction of the Pacific. The wallpaper was most commonly hung in shared or social spaces in the home like parlours.

This wallpaper became popular and hundreds of copies were produced and sold to consumers in France, England and America. The depiction of native peoples from Australia, New Zealand, Tahiti and Alaska in Les Sauvages made it interesting to audiences. The success of this work marked the start of the successful panoramic scenic wallpaper industry, with Joseph Dufour & Cie and Zuber & Cie among the notable prolific producers.

=== Significance And Legacy ===
There has been significant interest in Les Sauvages throughout the twentieth and twenty-first centuries. Primarily, this was due to the acceptance of decorative arts as a high art form within art history. American scholar, interior designer and dealer Nancy McClelland was instrumental in reviving an engagement with the history of panoramic wallpapers and wrote extensively on Les Sauvages in the 1920s. Commercial exhibitions of panoramic wallpapers by French dealer André Carlhian and books written by Henri Clouzot also enhanced critical engagement with Les Sauvages. The wallpaper as an unusual art form was previously overlooked in academia and was not acquired by museums. The scholars of this time researched the context of production, biographical details of the makers and aesthetic features. A prominent exhibition was held at the Musée des Arts décoratifs in Paris from 1990 to 1991 which sparked further interest in scenic wallpapers as a “social mirror” reflecting the world of early nineteenth century France.

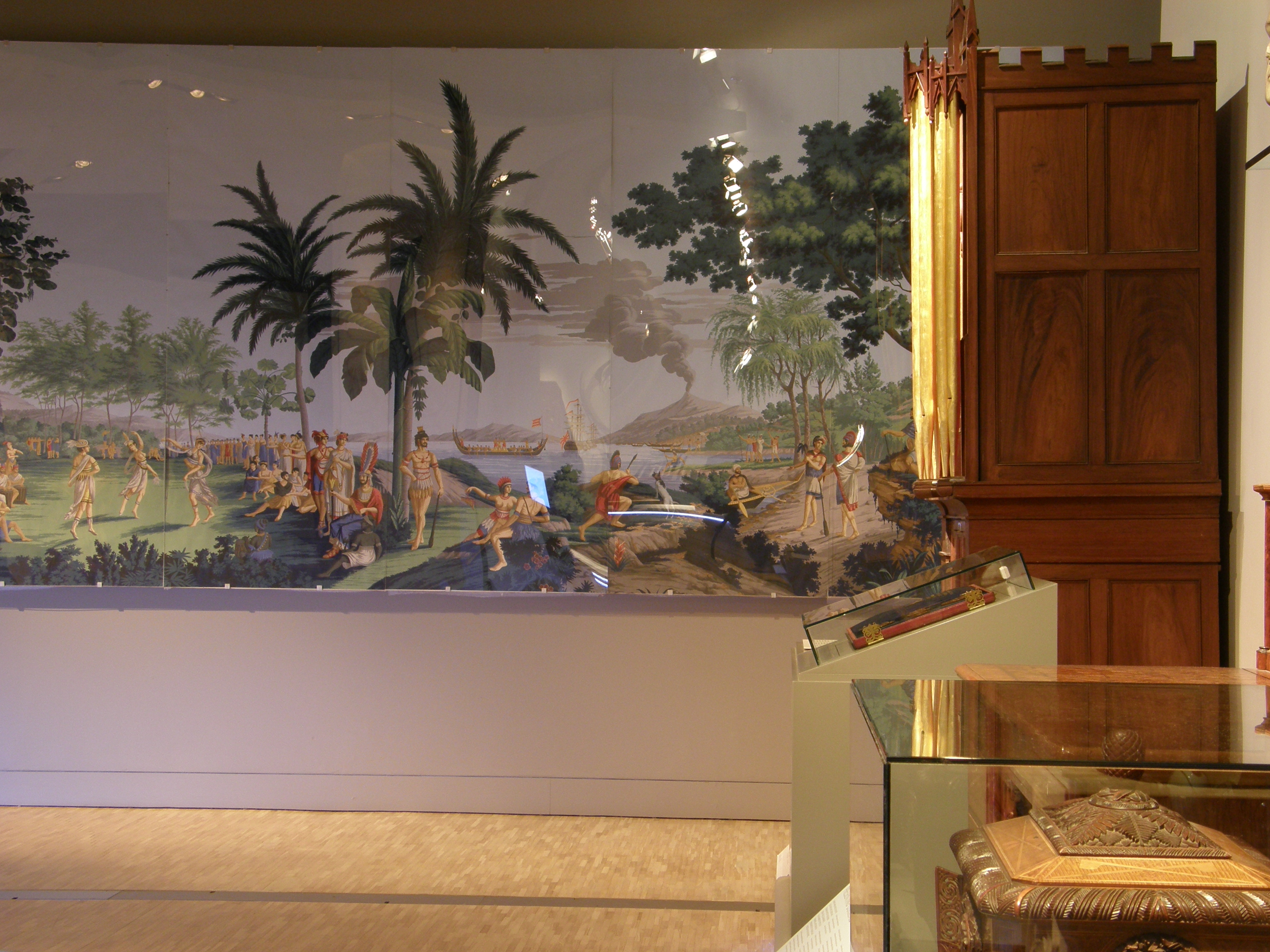
Les Sauvages de la Mer Pacifique on display in the Auckland Museum amongst a display of works which pertain to the early European engagement with New Zealand.

From the 1980s onwards Les Sauvages garnered significant appraisal within the Pacific region. This interest was due to the rise in popularity of postcolonial methodologies in art history and a reappraisal of colonial artefacts and histories. The emerging fascination of Les Sauvages in the Pacific can be easily traced by the acquisition of the work in state and national art museums in Australia, New Zealand and Hawaii from the 1980s onwards.

Les Sauvages has also inspired contemporary artists to create artworks which appropriate or subvert the inherent colonial gaze of the wallpaper. The most prominent example is In Pursuit of Venus (2017) by New Zealand artist, Lisa Reihana. This digital wallpaper appropriates Dufour's composition by replacing the classical figures with real First Nations people in traditional dress. This work attempts to challenge and disrupt colonial histories. Reihana's work was selected to represent New Zealand at the 2017 Venice Biennale.

== Panel descriptions ==
A description of the individual panels follows:

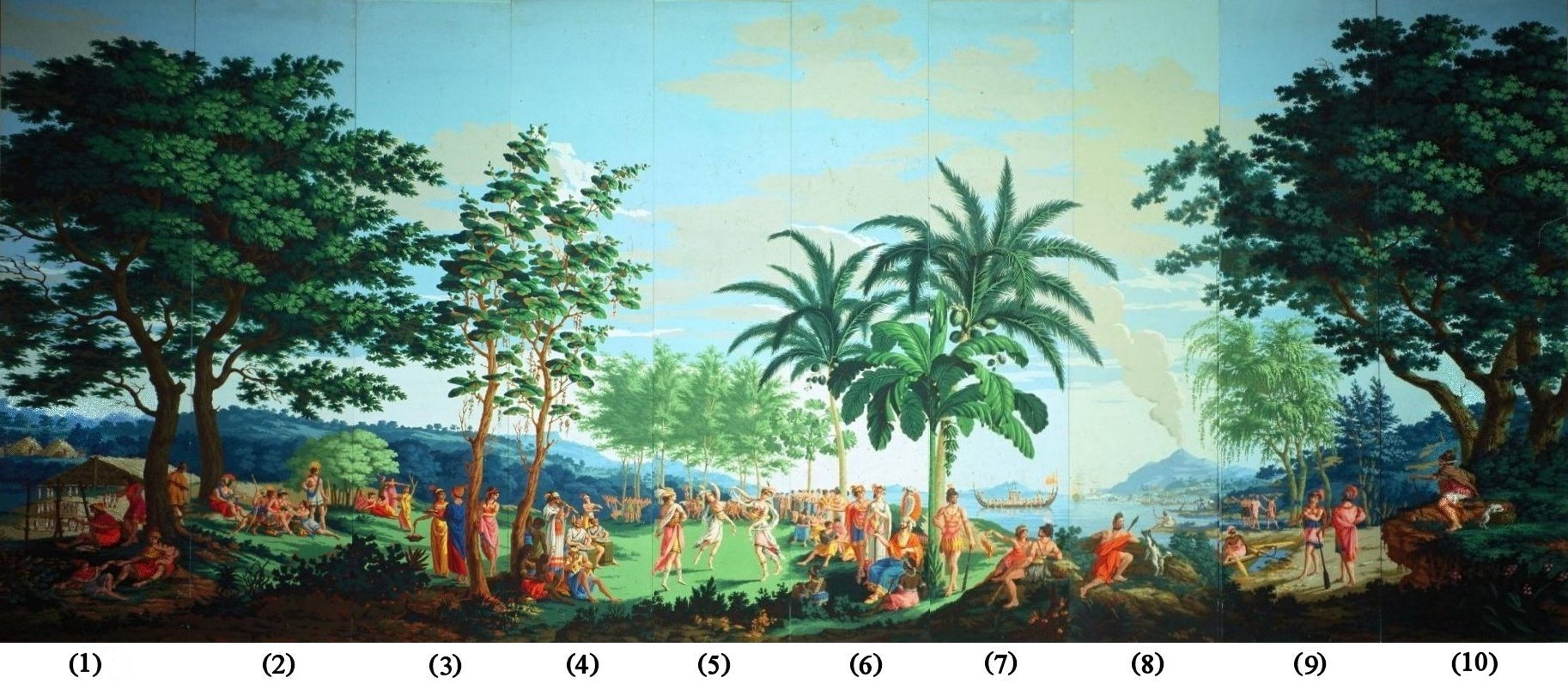
'Sauvages de la Mer Pacifique', panels 1-10 of woodblock printed wallpaper designed by Jean-Gabriel Charvet and manufactured by Joseph Dufour

- Panel 1: Inhabitants of Nootka Island in Canada, which was visited by Cook in March 1778.
- Panel 2: Inhabitants of Raiatea, the second largest of the Society Islands in French Polynesia, Chief Oreo met Captain Cook in 1777.
- Panel 3: Inhabitants of Ha'apai in Tonga. A man, a woman and a girl behind plum trees taking part in feast of the Arroey (seen in panel-2).
- Panels 4-6: Inhabitants of Tahiti, the largest island in French Polynesia. O-too, King of Tahiti, in panel 6, on a throne beneath a banana tree between two coconut trees, with his daughter and sister in 1773. The scene is a heiva, a kind of dramatic dance accompanied by flutes, drums and a chorus of singing and clapping girls.
- Panel 7: Inhabitants of Tanna (New Hebrides, Vanuatu) visited by Cook in July 1774. There are three islanders in foreground. The double war canoe in the background was launched during Cook's stay in Pare, Tahiti.
- Panels 8-9: Inhabitants of the Sandwich Islands (Hawaii) visited by Cook for the third time in January 1779. Chief Kaneena is in the foreground of panel 9 and behind him, another chief watch Cook's death. Cook's two ships, HMS Resolution and the smaller HMS Discovery, are anchored off shore. The volcano in the background resembles Mount Yasur on the island of Tanna in New Hebrides, and is unlike any in Hawaii.
- Panels 10-11: Inhabitants of New Zealand, discovered by Abel Tasman. In panel 10 Chief Kaoora, who killed a detachment of Captain Furneaux's crew, sits on a rock under two gris-gris trees. In panel 11 a New Zealand woman and child with warriors on a trail to the rear.

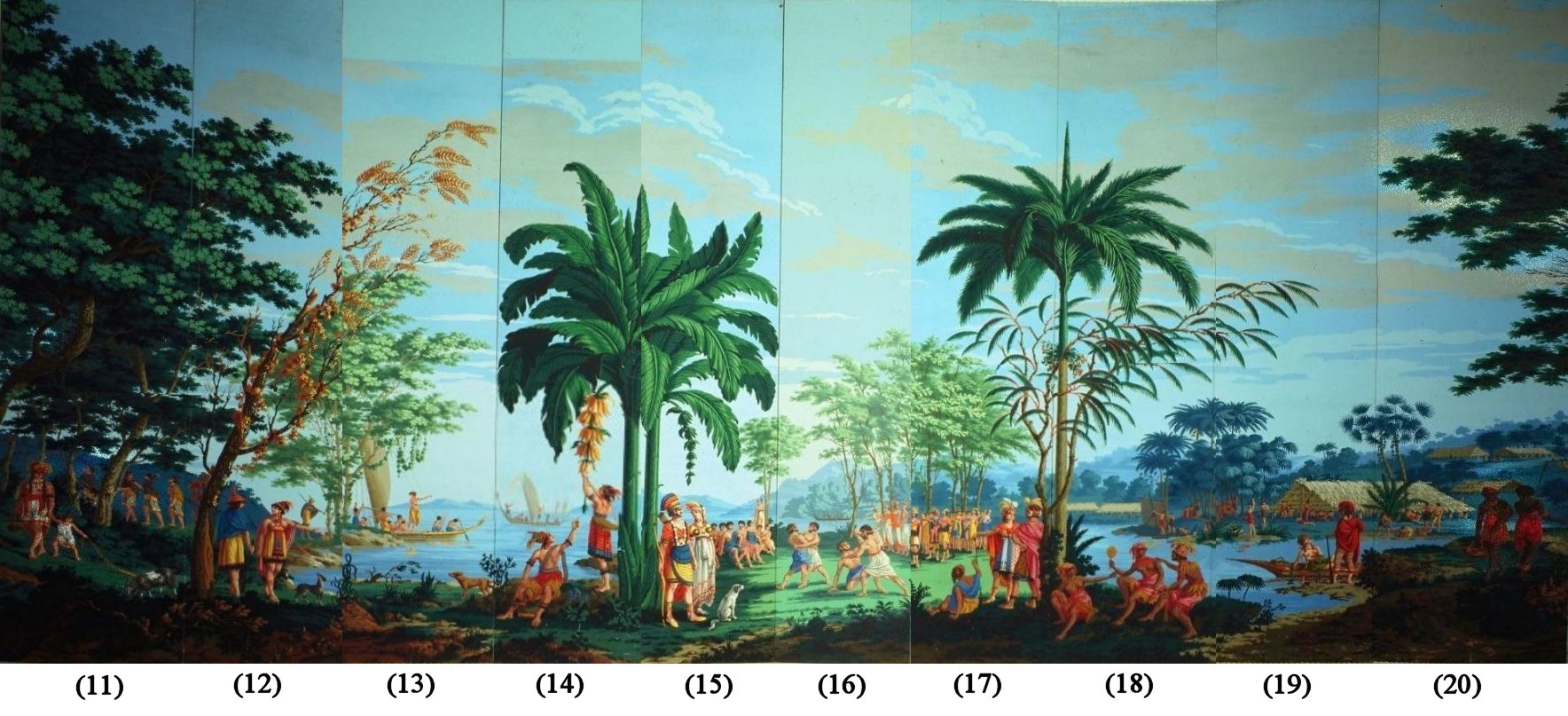
'Sauvages de la Mer Pacifique', panels 11-20 of woodblock printed wallpaper designed by Jean-Gabriel Charvet and manufactured by Joseph Dufour

- Panel 12: Inhabitants of the Straits of Prince William, 1778 (Sandwich Sound, Alaska). They resemble their neighbors, the natives of Nootka Island.
- Panel 13: Inhabitants of Nomuka with Abel Tasman on Rotterdam Island (now called Anamocka) in 1643. A vessel is filled with island natives during Cook's visit in 1777.
- Panel 14: Inhabitants of New Caledonia, visited by Cook in 1773. Natives picking bananas resemble natives of Tanna, their nearest neighbor.
- Panels 15-16: Inhabitants of Tongatapu, the main island of Tonga and the most important of the Society Islands. Cook anchored in June 1777 accompanied by Omai and Chief Finau 'Ulukalala and was received by King Fatafehi Paulaho at a great feast. The King stands beneath the banana tree with his favorite wife. In the background of panel 16 are Finau and Omai standing under tamarind trees watching wrestlers.
- Panel 17: Inhabitants of Santa Christina in the Marquesas Islands. King Honoo of Santa Christina and his Queen watch the Tongatabo fête with other inhabitants in the background under the tamarind trees.
- Panel 18: Inhabitants of Marquesas Islands, discovered by Álvaro de Mendaña in 1595 and visited by Cook in 1773. A man and two women are seated beneath a palm tree. People in middle distance of panels 18-19 are of Cape Maria van Diemen, New Holland (Australia) and Admiralty Islands. Jacques Julien Houton de la Billardière visited the later in 1791–94 while searching for Marquis de La Pérouse.
- Panel 19: Inhabitants of Easter Island, which was allegedly discovered by the English buccaneer Captain John Davis in 1686 and visited by Cook in 1773. Two people in foreground are of Easter Island.
- Panel 20: Inhabitants of Palau, where English sea captain Henry Wilson sailing on the Antelope was shipwrecked in August 1783. In foreground are King Aba-Thule and his wife Ludee, who returned to Europe with Wilson on a boat built in Palau.

The Art Gallery of New South Wales (Australia), Historic Deerfield (Deerfield, Massachusetts), the Honolulu Museum of Art and the Fine Arts Museums of San Francisco usually have Sauvages de la Mer Pacifique on display. In 1995 the Mackelvie Trust acquired a significant panel from Sauvages de la Mer Pacifique - sections 15, 16 and 17 - which is held by the Auckland Art Gallery in Auckland, New Zealand.

== Trivia ==
William Bligh of Mutiny on the Bounty fame was sailing master on HMS Resolution (depicted in panel 8), and explorer George Vancouver was a 21-year-old midshipman on HMS Discovery.

== Sources ==
- Bioletti, Susie, Davey, Ranson and Peel, Rose. “Made in Maçon: Investigations into the production of wallpaper.” In Les Sauvages de la Mer Pacifique, edited by Susan Hall, 21–26. Australia: Thames and Hudson, 2000.
- Bougainville, L. Antoine de. Voyage Round the World. Translated by J.R. Forster. London: J. Exshar, 1772.
- Butler, Roger. “Les Sauvages de la Mer Pacifique: in England, America and Australia.” In Les Sauvages de la Mer Pacifique, edited by Susan Hall, 15–20. Australia: Thames and Hudson, 2000.
- Crick, Clare. “Two Wallpapers by Dufour et Compagnie.” Pharos '78, (June 1978).
- Dang, Rachelle. “Southern Oceans.” Accessed April 23, 2019. http://www.rachelledang.com/.
- de Champagny, Jean-Baptiste de Nompère. Notices sur les objets envoyés à l'exposition des produits de l'industrie Française. Paris: Ministre de L'Interieur, 1806. https://books.google.com.au/books?id=HzlEAAAAcAAJ&pg=PA1&lpg=PA1&dq=notices+sur+les+objets+envoyes+a+l%27exposition+des+produits+de+l%27industrie+francaise+redigees+et+imprimees+par+ordre+de+S.E.M.+de+champagny+Paris+1806&source=bl&ots=fYCwwI_G_D&sig=ACfU3U1R7Y8yPMfXPPrJiBOs2wIuHn26PA&hl=en&sa=X&ved=2ahUKEwjy1bqNgMzhAhWX4XMBHUEZDA4Q6AEwBnoECAkQAQ#v=onepage&q=dufour&f=false.
- Encyclopædia Britannica. “Pompeii.” Accessed May 1, 2019. https://www.britannica.com/place/Pompeii.
- Entwisle, E.A. “Jacquemart et Bérnard and Other Makers.” In French Scenic Wallpapers 1800-1860, 41–46. London: F. Lewis Publishers Ltd, 1972.
- Futernick, Robert. “Conservation of Scenic Wallpapers: “Sauvages de la Mer Pacifique”.” Journal of the American Institute for Conservation 20, no. 2, (Spring 1981): 139-146.
- Honolulu Academy of Arts. Honolulu Academy of Arts, Selected works. Honolulu, Hawaii: Honolulu Academy of Arts, 1990.
- Joseph Dufour. “Les Sauvages de la Mer Pacifique: tableau pour d’écoration en papier peint.” translated by Peter Rudd, In Les Sauvages de la Mer Pacifique, edited by Susan Hall, 32-40. Australia: Thames and Hudson, 2000.
- Lee, Mary Wood, Bachman, Konstanze and Fletcher, Shelley. “Sauvages de la Mer du Pacifique: Treatment of an early 19th century wallpaper depicting the voyages and death of Captain Cook.” AIC preprints, (May 30–June 2, 1977): 92–103.
- Massey University. “Imagining Paradise: Embroidering Myth.” Accessed April 23, 2019. https://mro.massey.ac.nz/bitstream/handle/10179/8349/02_whole.pdf.
- McClelland, Nancy. Historic Wallpapers. America: Lippincott, 1924.
- National Gallery of Australia. “Les Sauvages de la Mer Pacifique.” Accessed April 23, 2019. https://artsearch.nga.gov.au/detail.cfm?irn=126293.
- National Gallery of Australia. “Paper conservation: Les Sauvages de la Mer Pacifique Made in Mâcon: Investigations into the production of wallpaper.” Accessed March 10, 2019. https://nga.gov.au/conservation/Paper/LesSauv.cfm.
- Nouvel-Kammerer, Odile. “Reasons for Silence.” In French Scenic Wallpaper 1795–1865, 13-37. France: Flammarion, 2000.
- Nouvel-Kammerer, Odile. “Scenic wallpaper, social mirror: Themes Reflecting a New View of Everyday Life.” In French Scenic Wallpaper 1795–1865, 103-135. France: Flammarion, 2000.
- Oxford Reference. “Neoclassicism.” Accessed April 23, 2019. http://www.oxfordreference.com.virtual.anu.edu.au/view/10.1093/acref/9780191807671.001.0001/acref-9780191807671-e-956.
- Prints + Printmaking. “Les Sauvages de la mer Pacifique.” Accessed April 15, 2019, http://www.printsandprintmaking.gov.au/works/35731/.
- Reihana, Lisa. “Artist talks.” Accessed April 20, 2019. http://www.inpursuitofvenus.com/artist-talks.
- Reihana, Lisa. “Venice Biennial.” Accessed April 20, 2019. http://www.inpursuitofvenus.com/venice-biennial.
- Rousseau, Jean-Jacques. Discourse on the Origin of Inequality. Translated by Donald A. Cress. Indianapolis: Hackett Pub.Co., 1992.
- Said, Edward. Orientalism. New York: Random House, 1979.
- Webb, Vivienne. “Biographical and catalogue notes.” In Les Sauvages de la Mer Pacifique, edited by Susan Hall, 42-43. Australia: Thames and Hudson, 2000.
- Webb, Vivienne. “List of holdings.” In Les Sauvages de la Mer Pacifique, edited by Susan Hall, 44-47. Australia: Thames and Hudson, 2000.
- Webb, Vivienne. “Voyages.” In Les Sauvages de la Mer Pacifique, edited by Susan Hall, 7-14. Australia: Thames and Hudson, 2000.
