= Surface printing =

Printing method

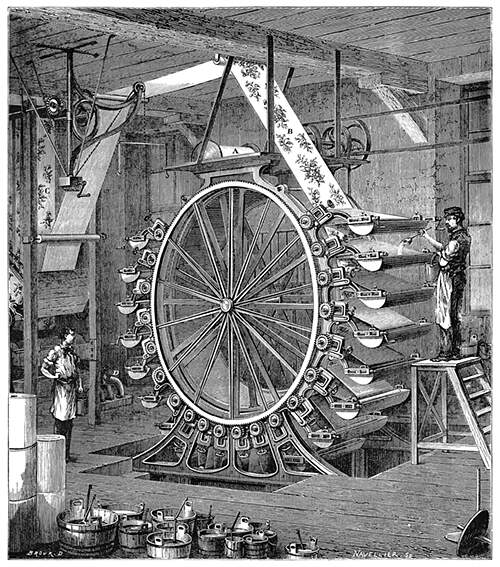
Surface printing machine printing wallpaper

Surface printing is an automated printing method. It was first used in 1839. Most wallpaper was originally printed on surface printing machines. Surface printing machines are structured similarly to a ferris wheel, with a large central roller over which the paper travels; the individual ink rollers transfer an image to the paper on the main roller.

== History ==
Surface printing was first used in 1839. It is the oldest automated printing method still in use today. Most wallpaper was originally printed on surface printing machines.

== Technique ==
Surface printing machines are structured similarly to a ferris wheel, with a large central roller that the paper travels over. Up to 12 individual ink rollers transfer an image to the paper on the main roller, laying down heavy amounts of ink. Because the ink is pushed onto the paper, the images are not as crisp as the other methods. Also, there is no drying stage between laying down each color, so the order of color run-throughs is very important to keep the inks from running into each other. Because of the amount of ink required for impressions, and the inexact image rendering, surface printing has a very distinct look.

== See also ==
- History of printing
- Wallpaper
