= Joseph Dufour et Cie =

18th and 19th century French wallpaper manufacturer

Joseph Dufour et Cie, founded in 1797 by Joseph and Pierre Dufour, was a French painted wallpaper and fabrics manufacturer (French: Manufacture de Papier Peints et Tissus) located in Mâcon, France.

== General ==
In 1806, in collaboration with the artist Jean-Gabriel Charvet, Dufour et Cie produced a twenty-panel set of scenic wallpaper entitled Sauvages de la Mer du Pacifique ('Savages of the Pacific'), which became the biggest success of the company. It was the largest panoramic wallpaper of its time, and marked the burgeoning of a French industry in panoramic wallpapers. Dufour realized almost immediate success from the sale of these papers and enjoyed a lively trade with America. Like most of eighteenth century wallpapers, the panorama was designed to be hung above a dado.

== History ==
For many years it was believed that Joseph Dufour was born in 1752. An error in his place of birth was the source of the mistake. Indeed, another Joseph Dufour was born in Mâcon, in 1752, whilst the founder of the manufacture was born in Tramayes in 1757 as the second child of Claude Dufour and Francoise Braillon.

Joseph Dufour trained in the wallpaper industry and worked in Lyon, which was a center for both the textile and wallpaper industries. In 1797, Joseph Dufour started the company together with his brother Pierre in Macon, Rue de la Paroisse. The designer Jean-Gabriel Charvet, renowned in Lyon, worked for them. Their first few years were not very successful; in 1800 they went into liquidation and Pierre left the company. By 1801, the business was operating under the name Joseph Dufour et Cie.

Then the company picked up rapidly, and in 1805 the company employed more than 90 workers. Following the success of Sauvages de la Mer du Pacifique at the Fourth Exhibition of Products of the French Industry in 1806, Joseph Dufour moved to Paris in the Faubourg Saint-Antoine. His company rapidly became famous in Europe and America not only for its panoramics but also for its repeating wallpaper. The company employed the talent of famous designers such as Xavier Mader and Evarist Fragonard.

Joseph Dufour died in Paris 1827. His son-in-law took on the business but sold it a few years later. The wood-blocks were scattered.

== Sauvages de la Mer Pacifique ==
Captain Cook first sailed from England to the South Seas in 1769. He made three expeditions before his death in 1779, and his adventures captured the imaginations of many Europeans at a time when there was considerable interest in the "primitive" and "exotic". His discoveries lent support to the prevailing notion of the inherent moral superiority of "the noble savage", an idea expressed in the writings of Jean-Jacques Rousseau (1712–1778). In 1784, accounts of Cook's voyages were set forth in an official three-volume publication. Accompanying this was a separate folio atlas containing 61 engravings of landscapes, portraits, and indigenous artifacts.

In 1806 Joseph Dufour et Cie, in collaboration with the designer Jean-Gabriel Charvet, produced a twenty-panel set of scenic wallpaper entitled Sauvages de la Mer du Pacifique ('Savages of the Pacific'), depicting Cook's travels. The wallpaper was printed in color from multiple woodblocks. Machine-made continuous paper, just invented, was not yet commercially available when Dufour undertook his project. Instead, small rectangular handmade sheets were joined at the edges to form long rolls, which were later cut to the desired length (approximately 24 by 98 inches or 61 × 249 cm). A toned, water-based ground layer was then applied by brush to the entire panel to act as an undercoat for subsequent printing. This light blue layer also served as the sky tone in unprinted areas. Designs for each color were carved on separate blocks, and as many as sixty were required to print a single panel. The design was then enhanced with stenciled hand-painted gouache.

The panels show many historical events loosely based on the reports of James Cook and La Pérouse and drawings made by members of their crews. Some of the figures of Pacific Islanders were based upon frescoes from ancient Pompei, which had been rediscovered in 1748, and others upon well-known Greek and Roman sculptures.

=== Panel descriptions ===
A description of the individual panels follows:

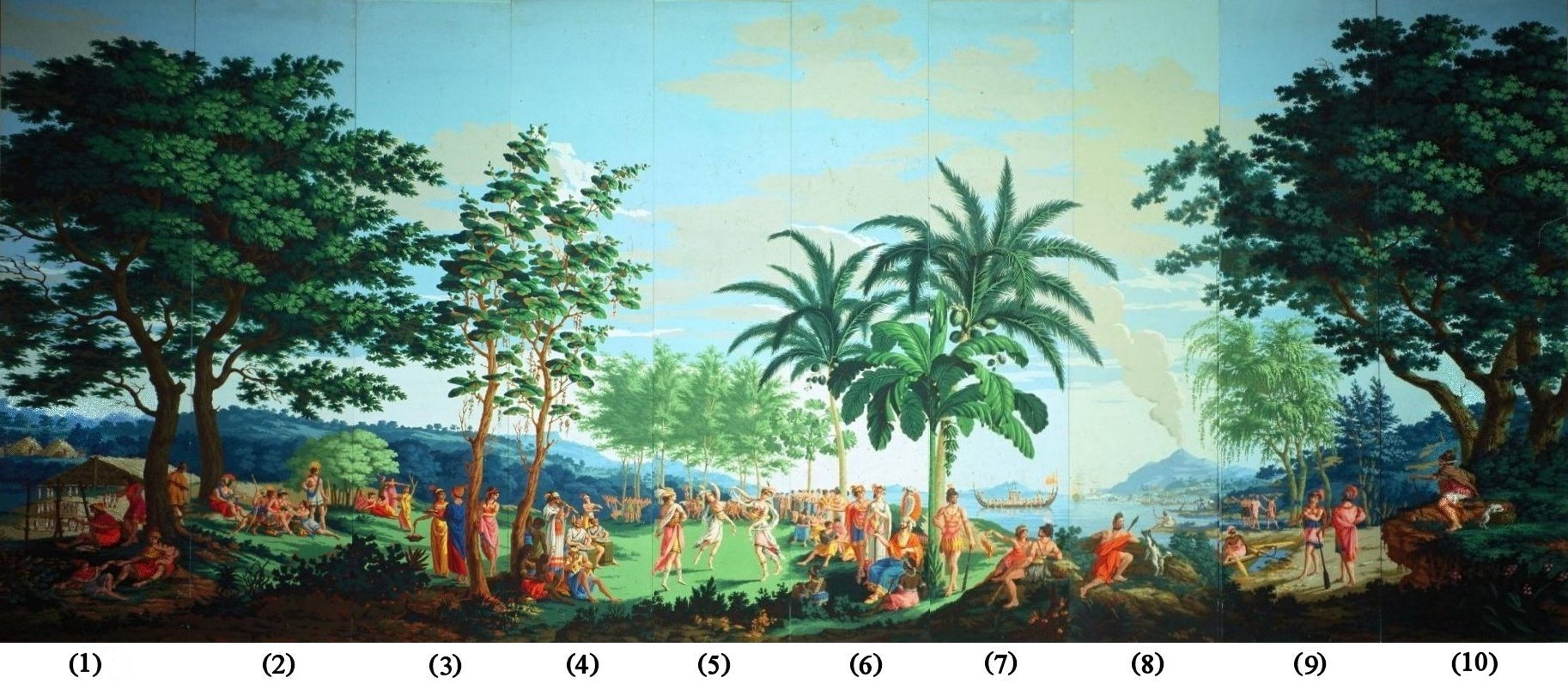
'Sauvages de la Mer Pacifique', panels 1-10 of woodblock printed wallpaper designed by Jean-Gabriel Charvet and manufactured by Joseph Dufour

- Panel 1: Inhabitants of Nootka Island in Canada, which was visited by Cook in March 1778.
- Panel 2: Inhabitants of Raiatea, the second largest of the Society Islands in French Polynesia, Chief Oreo met Captain Cook in 1777.
- Panel 3: Inhabitants of Ha'apai in Tonga. A man, a woman and a girl behind plum trees taking part in feast of the Arroey (seen in panel-2).
- Panels 4 to 6: Inhabitants of Tahiti, the largest island in French Polynesia. O-too, King of Tahiti, in panel 6, on a throne beneath a banana tree between two coconut trees, with his daughter and sister in 1773. The scene is a kind of dramatic dance accompanied by flutes, drums and a chorus of singing and clapping girls.
- Panel 7: Inhabitants of Tanna (New Hebrides, Vanuatu) visited by Cook in July 1774. There are three islanders in the foreground. The double war canoe in the background was launched during Cook's stay in Pare, Tahiti.
- Panels 8 and 9: Inhabitants of the Sandwich Islands (Hawaii) visited by Cook for the third time in January 1779. Chief Kaneena is in the foreground of panel 9 and behind him, another chief watch Cook's death. Cook's two ships, HMS Resolution and the smaller HMS Discovery, are anchored off shore. The volcano in the background resembles Mount Yasur on the island of Tanna in New Hebrides, and is unlike any in Hawaii.
- Panels 10 and 11: Inhabitants of New Zealand, discovered by Abel Tasman. In panel 10 Chief Kaoora, who killed a detachment of Captain Furneaux's crew, sits on a rock under two gris-gris trees. In panel 11 a New Zealand woman and child with warriors on a trail to the rear.

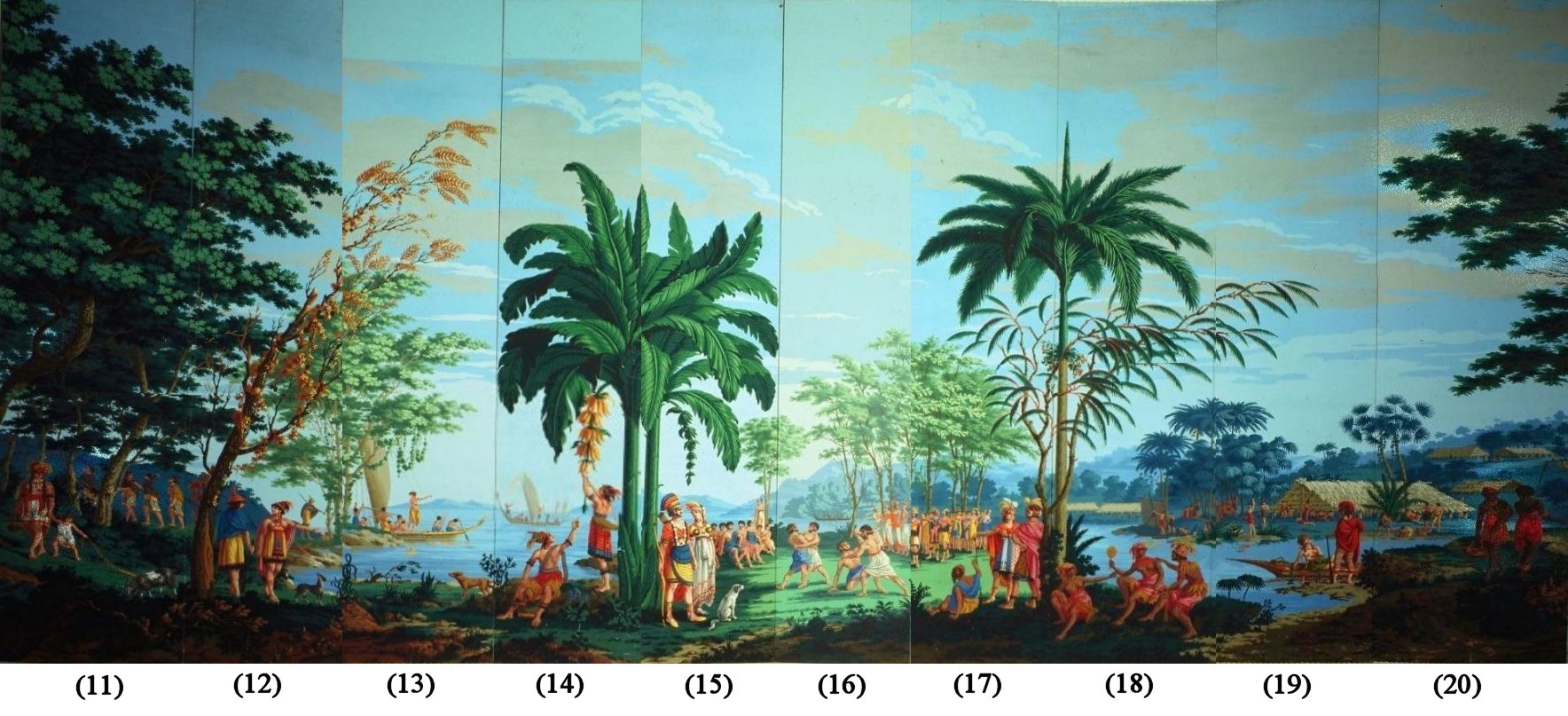
'Sauvages de la Mer Pacifique', panels 11-20 of woodblock printed wallpaper designed by Jean-Gabriel Charvet and manufactured by Joseph Dufour

- Panel 12: Inhabitants of the Straits of Prince William, 1778 (Sandwich Sound, Alaska). They resemble their neighbors, the natives of Nootka Island.
- Panel 13: Inhabitants of Nomuka with Abel Tasman on Rotterdam Island (now called Anamocka) in 1643. A vessel is filled with island natives during Cook's visit in 1777.
- Panel 14: Inhabitants of New Caledonia, visited by Cook in 1773. Natives picking bananas resemble natives of Tanna, their nearest neighbor.
- Panels 15 and 16: Inhabitants of Tongatapu, the main island of Tonga and the most important of the Society Islands. Cook anchored in June 1777 accompanied by Omai and Chief Finau 'Ulukalala and was received by King Fatafehi Paulaho at a great feast. The King stands beneath the banana tree with his favorite wife. In the background of panel 16 are Finau and Omai standing under tamarind trees watching wrestlers.
- Panel 17: Inhabitants of Santa Christina in the Marquesas Islands. King Honoo of Santa Christina and his Queen watch the Tongatabo fête with other inhabitants in the background under the tamarind trees.
- Panel 18: Inhabitants of Marquesas Islands, discovered by Álvaro de Mendaña in 1595 and visited by Cook in 1773. A man and two women are seated beneath a palm tree. People in middle distance of panels 18-19 are of Cape Maria van Diemen, New Holland (Australia) and Admiralty Islands. Jacques Julien Houton de la Billardière visited the later in 1791–94 while searching for Marquis de La Pérouse.
- Panel 19: Inhabitants of Easter Island, which was allegedly discovered by the English buccaneer Captain John Davis in 1686 and visited by Cook in 1773. Two people in foreground are of Easter Island.
- Panel 20: Inhabitants of Palau, where English sea captain Henry Wilson sailing on the Antelope was shipwrecked in August 1783. In foreground are King Aba-Thule and his wife Ludee, who returned to Europe with Wilson on a boat built in Palau.

The Art Gallery of New South Wales (Australia), Historic Deerfield (Deerfield, Massachusetts), the Honolulu Museum of Art and the Fine Arts Museums of San Francisco usually have Sauvages de la Mer Pacifique on display.
