= Meystyle =

- Industry: Manufacturing
- Headquarters: London
- Products: LED wallpaper; Fabric

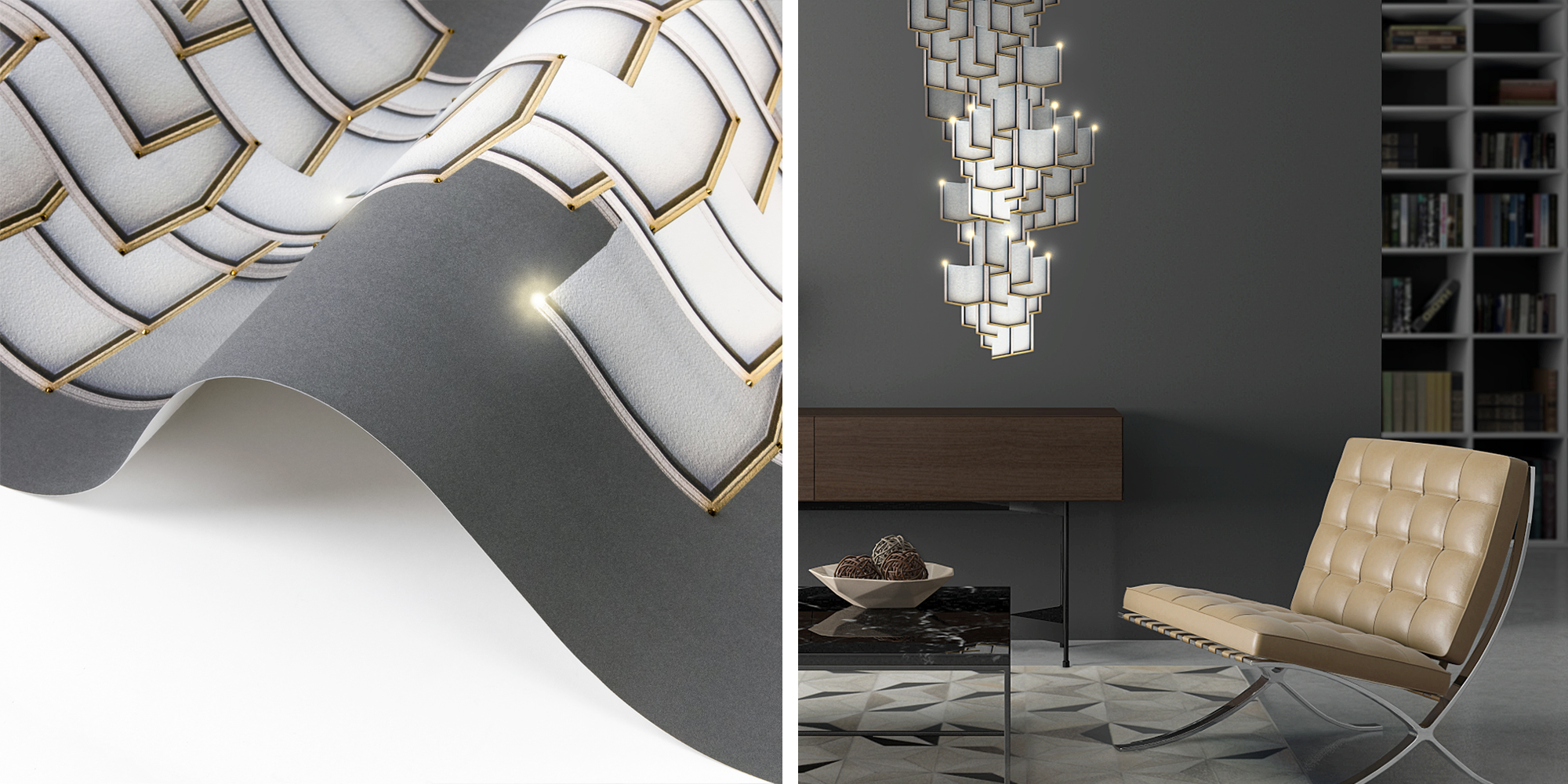
Lattice Systems by Meystyle

Meystyle LED wallpaper & Fabric is a London-based company who specialise in designing and manufacturing bespoke wallpaper with the added feature of integrated light-emitting diodes. The company was initiated in 2004 as a collaboration between sisters Maria and Ekaterina Yaschuk, both graduates of the Central Saint Martins College of Arts and Design in London.

== History ==
Meystyle claims to have been the first company to pioneer the technology to fully integrate light-emitting diodes into the material of the wallpaper so that it can be hung like a traditional wall covering. The first prototype of LED incorporated wallpaper was presented by Maria Yaschuk as part of her graduation project for the MA degree in Textile Futures at CSM in 2004. The concept was successively developed together with her sister Ekaterina into a series of designs themed around the idea of exploring the interconnection between real physical space and representational space. The series was exhibited in 2007 under the name Wire Geometrics at the National Glass Centre in Sunderland as part of its Neon showcase. The same year Maria and Ekaterina went on to commercialise their product under the company name Meystyle LED Wallpaper & Fabric.

== Company profile ==
Meystyle uses digital printing to transfer their designs on a variety of non-woven substrates suitable for wall covering. The LEDs are then incorporated by hand with a special technique that avoids adding any thickness to the material. Some designs make use of Swarovski crystals and hand-painted details. Since its launch, Meystyle's contributions to the wallpaper design industry have been referenced in magazine editorials and books like Digital Visions for Fashion + Textiles by Sarah E. Braddock Clarke and Jane Harris, Textiles: Innovations et matières actives by Florence Bost and Guillermo Crosetto, Patterns: Design, Architecture, Interiors edited by Shirley Surya. Meystyle's peculiar approach to design often makes use of complex layering of shapes and textures to create an illusion of dimension as opposed to the two-dimensional surface of the wall. In 2008 professor Marie O'Mahony of the Faculty of Design, Architecture & Building of the University of Technology Sydney selected Meystyle to participate at the IFAI Design Exhibition in Charlotte, US, as part of the IFAI Expo 2008 on advanced textiles for health and safety. In 2014 Meystyle was awarded the prestigious Maison & Objet Projects Award for the Lattice Systems LED Wallpaper collection in recognition of the highly innovative contribution given to the interior design industry.
