= Wall decal =

Decorative item

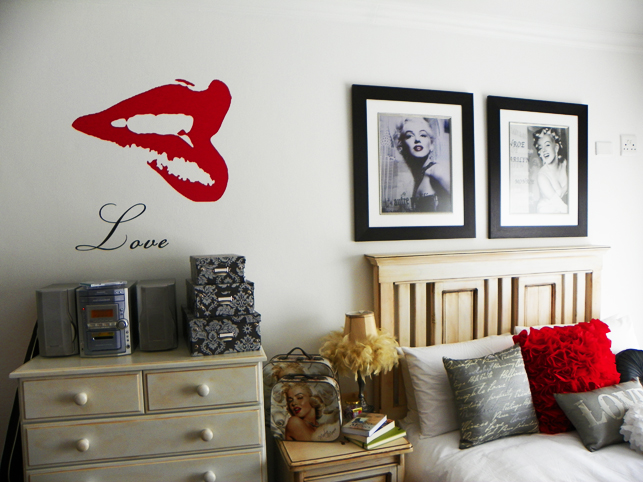
This photo depicts an installed wall decal of red lips and the word "love".

A wall decal, also known as a wall sticker, wall tattoo, or wall vinyl, is a vinyl sticker that is affixed to a wall or other smooth surface, typically indoors, for decoration and informational purposes. Most decals use only one color, but some may have various images printed upon them.

== Types and sizes ==
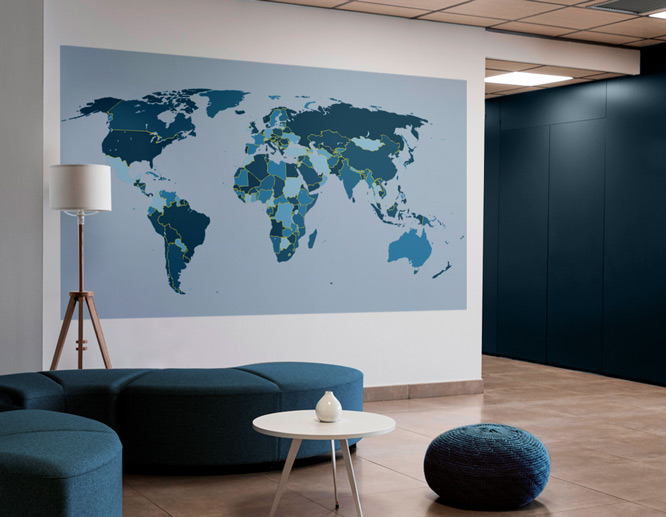
A large world map wall decal decorates a modern office lounge.

Decals can range from simple small wall borders and cut-outs to more complex murals covering entire walls. They may feature words, pictures and designs, and may come in various shapes and sizes. Wall decals may be made of polyester, vinyl, or a cotton blend, depending on the intended use. They can be as small or as large as necessary. Regular wall decals are usually between 30 cm x 50 cm and 60 cm x 100 cm. Larger decals may be 100 cm x 100 cm or larger.

Most vinyl decals are removable but not reusable, although some reusable vinyl types are available. They use a different adhesive on the rear, which means they can be re-positioned a couple of times before the adhesive wears out. Vinyl stickers at a large size can be very difficult to apply as they can tear, stretch and stick back on themselves. Traditional decals are made from PVC plastic and cut from a single colour using a vinyl cutting machine or laser cutter. It is possible to print a full colour image onto vinyl and then contour cut around it. Block cut vinyls come in many different finishes from glitter, to metallic, to mirror effect. They can also be supplied as blackboard or whiteboard finish and cut to shape to create a wall decal.

A range of non-PVC fabric wall decals sold as "FabriStick" is made from a finely woven fabric with 3M type adhesive on the rear. It can be printed to full colour and still profile cut to create intricate designs. It does not stretch, tear or peel back on itself and is re-positionable and re-usable in a way that vinyl stickers are not.

== Uses ==
Vinyl decals have various uses. Vinyl decals were originally only used for sign making, but they have recently been added to interior decorators' portfolios and have also become well known as a Do-It-Yourself home decorating option. The fabric wall stickers are particularly popular with people in rental properties as they allow personal creativity in home decoration without any damage to the walls. Even better, the wall decorations can be put back onto the supplied backing sheets and taken to the next property.

Decals can be used on windows, walls or tiles as branding, advertising, or decoration. It can also be used by interior designers. They may also serve as a tool to inform people that there is a glass door or window.

== See also ==
- Wall paper
- Decals
- Stickers
- Vinyl sign cutter
- Accent wall
