= Pygmalion (mythology) =

King and sculptor in Greek mythology

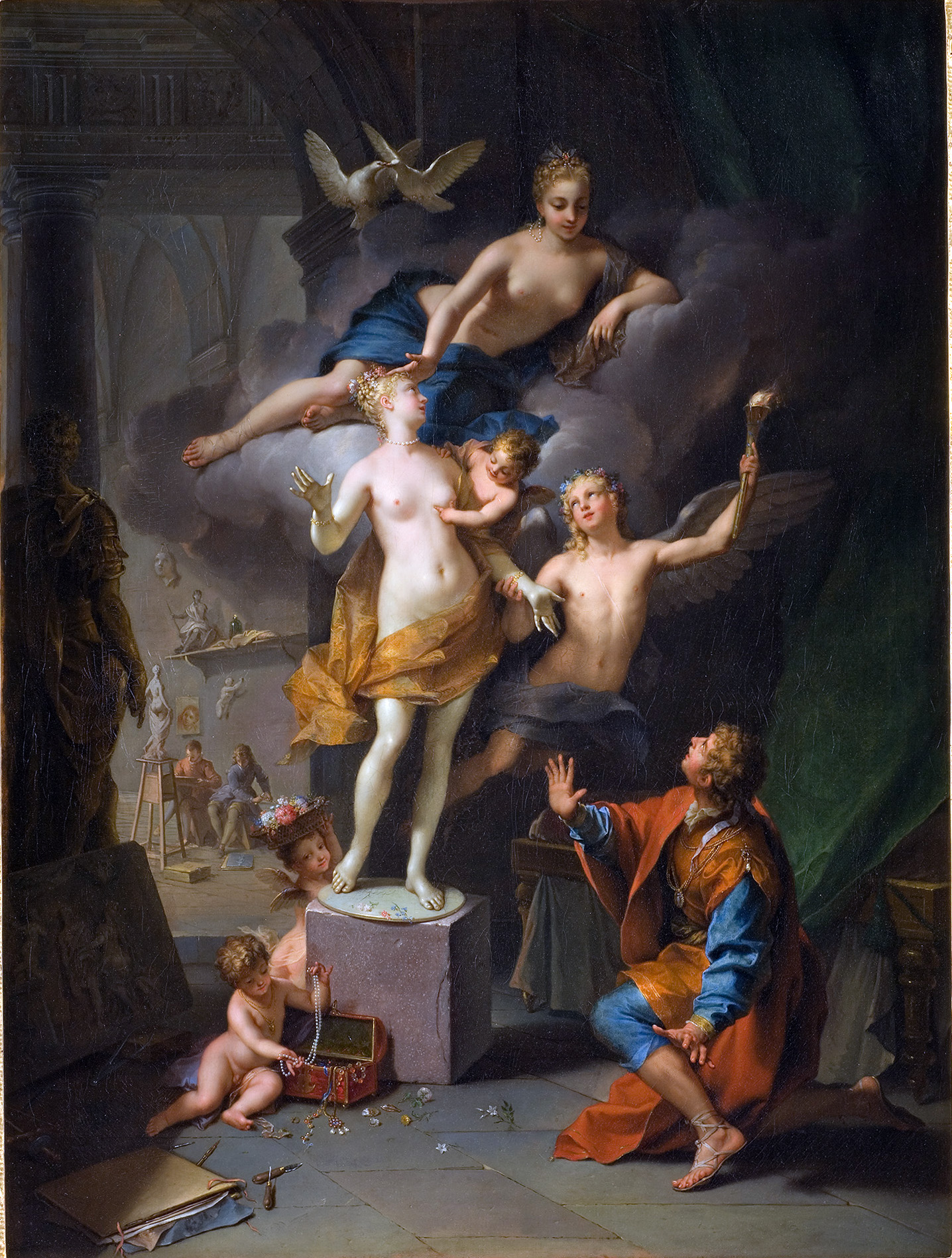
Pygmalion Adoring His Statue by Jean Raoux, 1717

In classical mythology, Pygmalion (/pɪɡˈmeɪliən/; Ancient Greek: Πυγμαλίων Pugmalíōn, gen.: Πυγμαλίωνος; Phoenician: 𐤐𐤌𐤉𐤉𐤕𐤍 Pūmayyātān) was a legendary Phoenician figure of Cyprus. He is most familiar from Ovid's narrative poem Metamorphoses, in which Pygmalion was a sculptor who fell in love with a statue he had carved.

== In Ovid ==
In book 10 of Ovid's Metamorphoses, Pygmalion was a Cypriot sculptor who carved a woman out of ivory alabaster. Post-classical sources name her Galatea.

According to Ovid, when Pygmalion saw the Propoetides of Cyprus practicing prostitution, he began "detesting the faults beyond measure which nature has given to women". He determined to remain celibate and to occupy himself with sculpting. He made a sculpture of a woman that he found so perfect he fell in love with it. Pygmalion kissed and fondled the sculpture, brought it various gifts, and created a sumptuous bed for it.

In time, Venus's festival day came and Pygmalion made offerings at the altar of Venus. There, too afraid to admit his desire, he quietly wished for a bride who would be "the living likeness of my ivory girl". When he returned home, he kissed his ivory statue, and found that its lips felt warm. He kissed it again, and found that the ivory had lost its hardness, as Venus had granted Pygmalion's wish.

Pygmalion married the ivory sculpture, which changed to a woman under Venus's blessing. In Ovid's narrative, they had a daughter, Paphos, from whom is derived the name of the city. Ovid's mention of Paphos suggests that he was drawing on a more circumstantial account than the source for a passing mention of Pygmalion in Pseudo-Apollodorus' Bibliotheke, a Hellenic mythography of the 2nd-century AD. Perhaps he drew on the lost narrative by Philostephanus that was paraphrased by Clement of Alexandria.

== Parallels in Greek myth ==
The story of the breath of life in a statue has parallels in the examples of Daedalus, who used quicksilver to install a voice in his statues or to make them move; of Hephaestus, who created automata for his workshop; of Talos, an artificial man of bronze, and (according to Hesiod) of Pandora, who was made from clay at the behest of Zeus.

The moral anecdote of the "Apega of Nabis", recounted by the historian Polybius, described a supposed mechanical simulacrum of the tyrant's wife, that crushed victims in her embrace.

The trope of a sculpture so life-like that it seemed about to move was a commonplace with writers on works of art in antiquity. This trope was inherited by writers on art after the Renaissance. An example of this trope appears in William Shakespeare's play, The Winter's Tale, where the king of Sicily is presented with an extremely lifelike statue of his wife (which is later revealed to be his wife, long presumed dead).

At an unknown date, later authors give as the name of the statue that of the sea-nymph Galatea or Galathea. Goethe calls her Elise, based upon the variants in the story of Dido/Elissa.

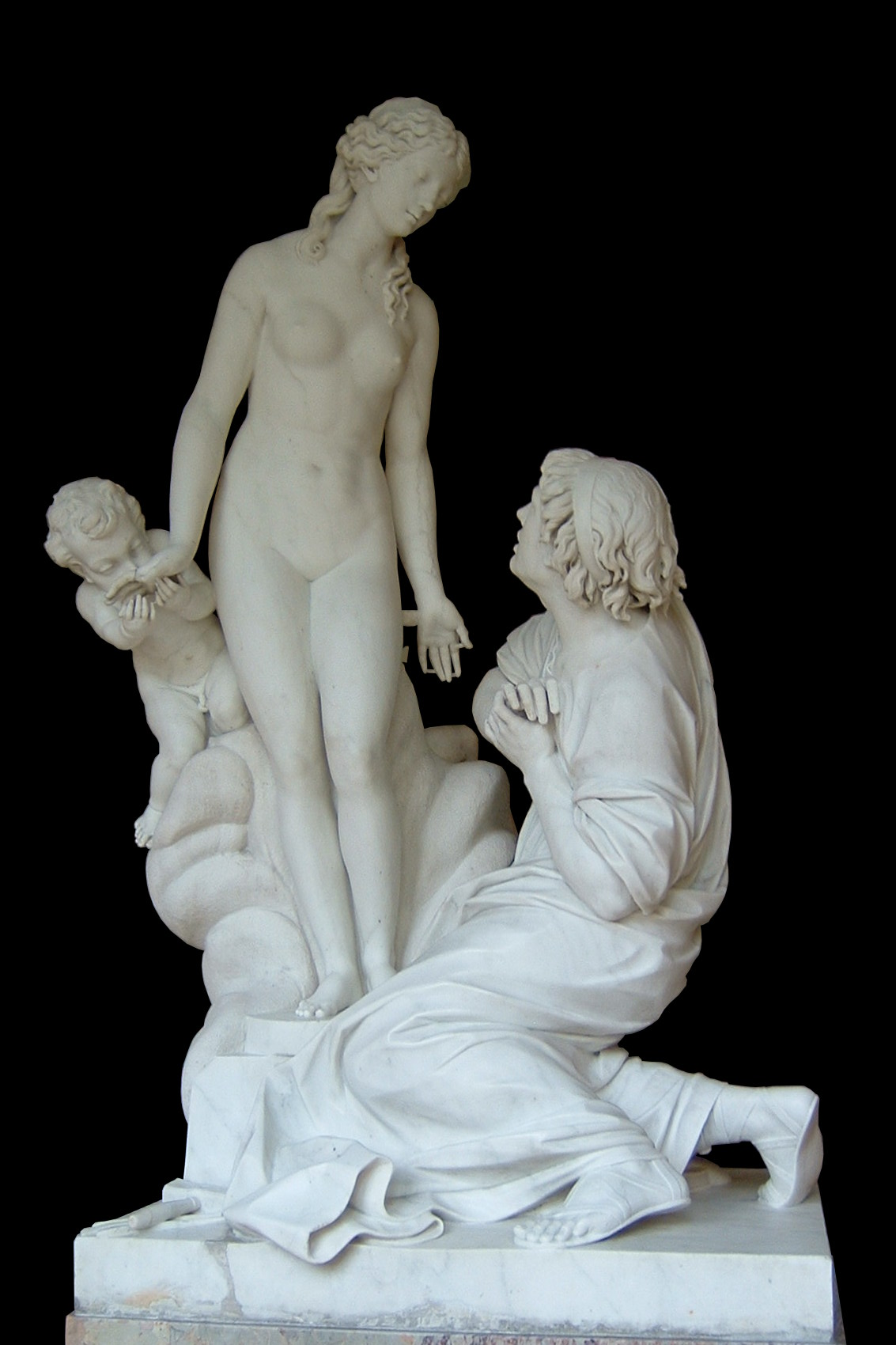
Étienne Maurice Falconet: Pygmalion et Galatée (Note: The invention of the name Galatea is modern; Falconet's title was Pygmalion aux pieds de sa statue qui s'anime, "Pygmalion at the feet of his statue, which comes to life".) (1763)

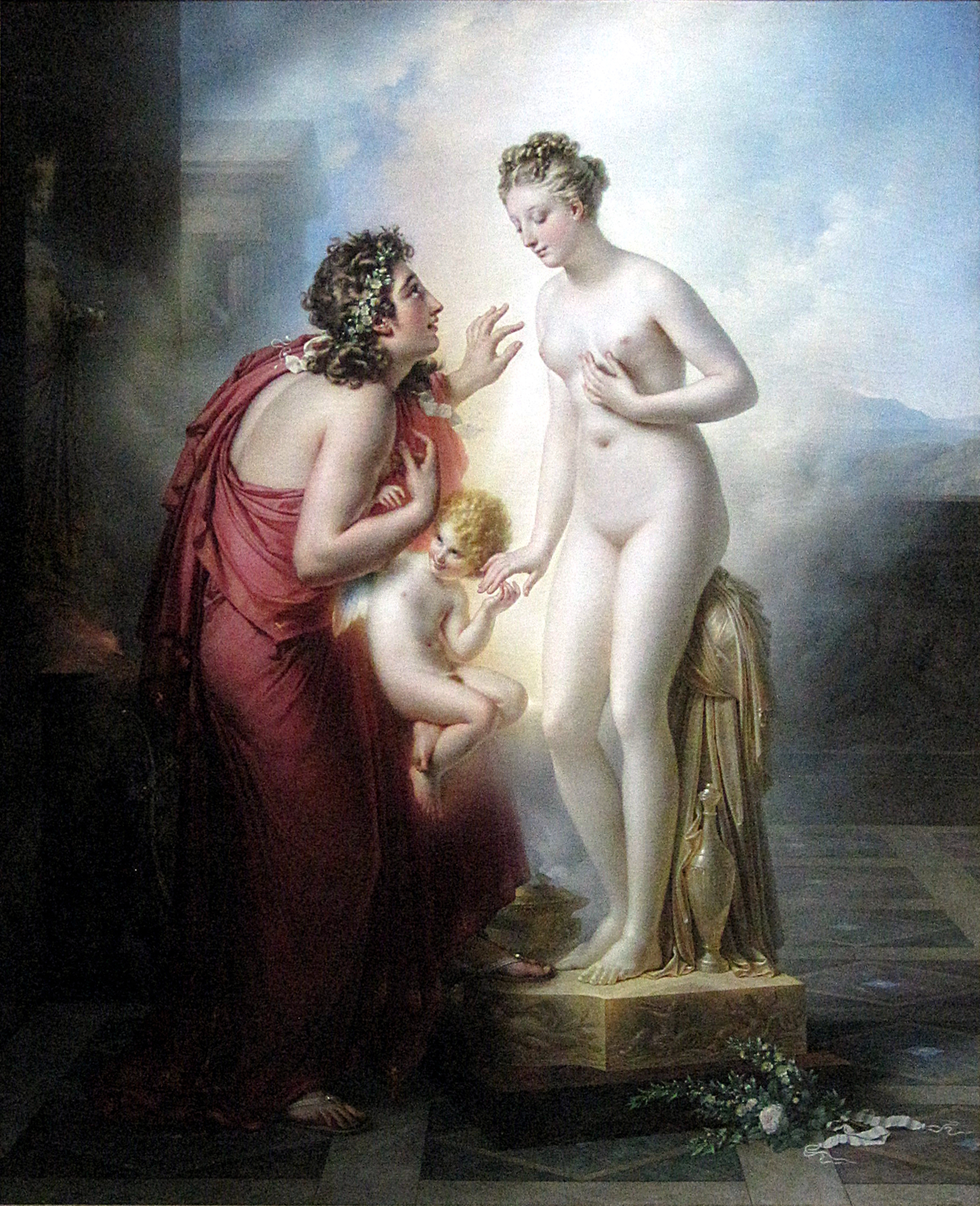
Pygmalion and Galatea by Girodet

== Modern representations ==
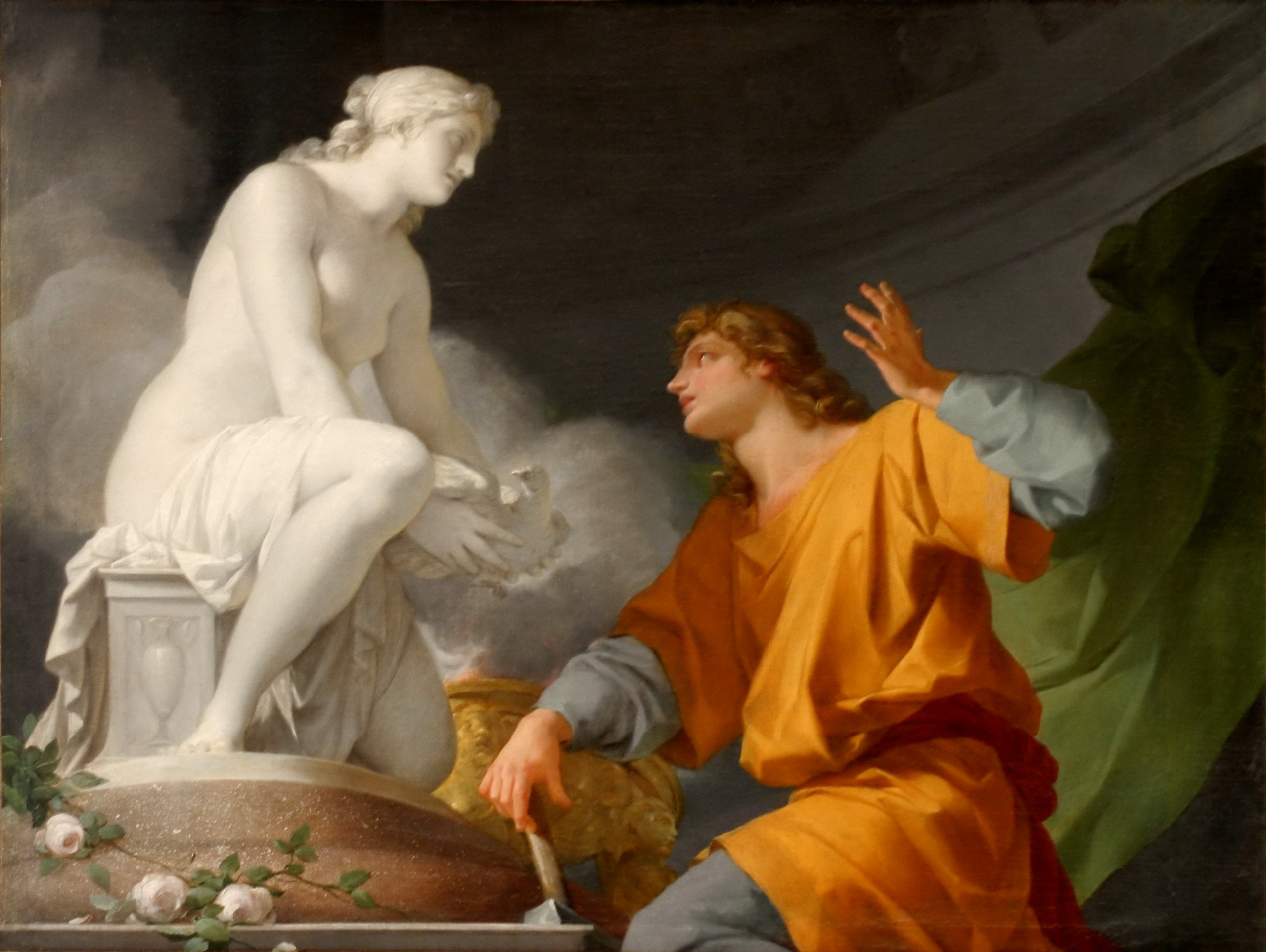
The Origin of Sculpture by Jean-Baptiste Regnault, 1786, Musée National du Château et des Trianons

=== Paintings ===
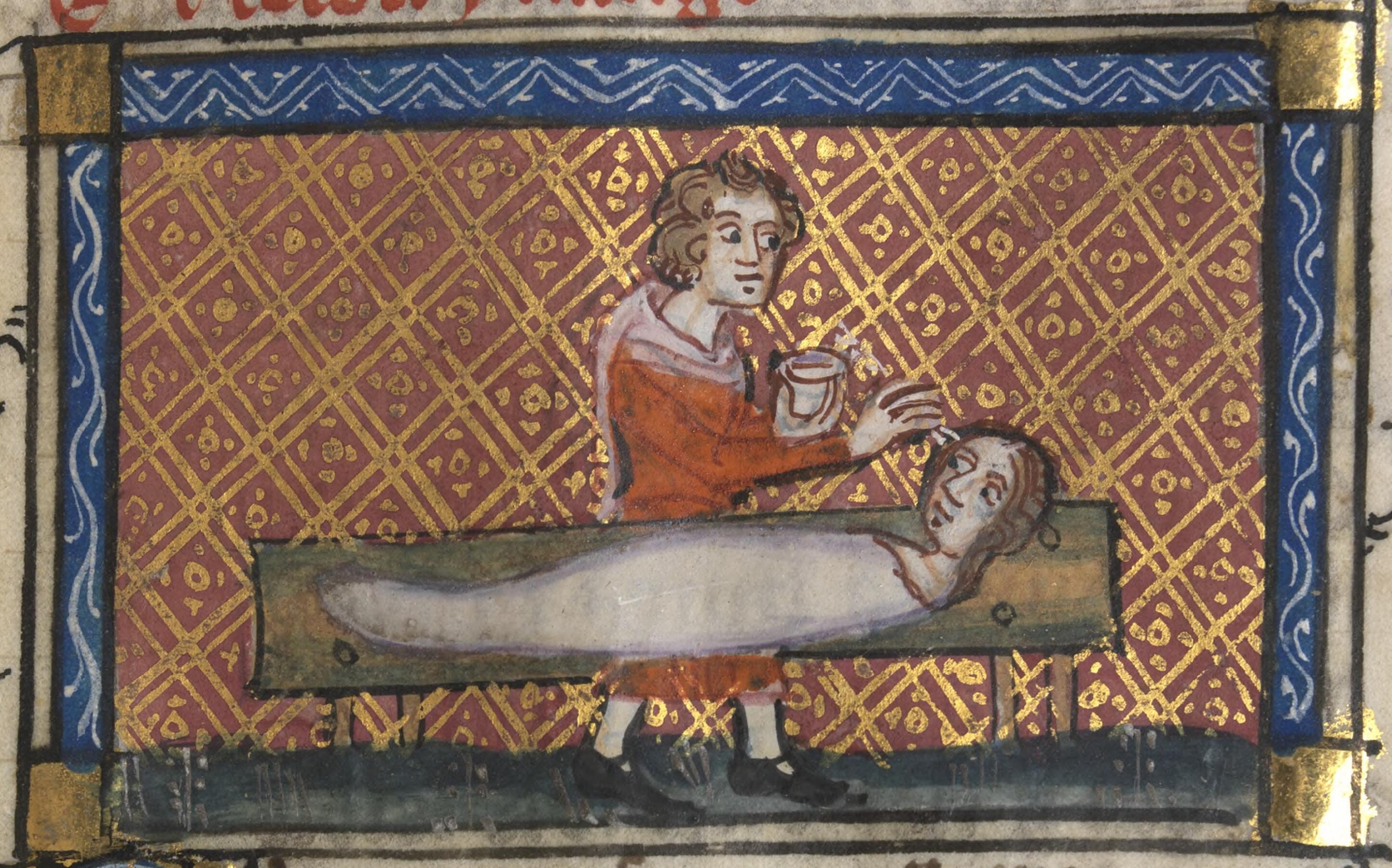
Miniature from a 14th-century manuscript of Pygmalion working on his sculpture

The story has been the subject of notable paintings by Agnolo Bronzino, Jean-Léon Gérôme (Pygmalion and Galatea), Honoré Daumier, Edward Burne-Jones (four major works from 1868 to 1870, then again in larger versions from 1875 to 1878 with the title Pygmalion and the Image), Auguste Rodin, Ernest Normand, Paul Delvaux, Francisco Goya, Franz von Stuck, François Boucher, Eduardo Chicharro y Agüera and Thomas Rowlandson, among others. There have also been numerous sculptures of the "awakening".

=== Literature ===
Ovid's Pygmalion has inspired many works of literature, some of which are listed below. The popularity of the Pygmalion myth surged in the 19th century.

==== Poems ====
===== England =====
- John Gower's "Pygmaleon and his Statue" in Book 4 of the Confessio Amantis (1390)
- John Marston's "Pigmalion", in "The Argument of the Poem" and "The Authour in prayse of his precedent Poem" (1598)
- John Dryden's poem "Pygmalion and the Statue" (1697–1700)
- Thomas Lovell Beddoes's "Pygmalion, or the Cyprian Statuary" (1823–25)
- William Cox Bennett's poem "Pygmalion" from his work Queen Eleanor's Vengeance and Other Poems (1856)
- Arthur Henry Hallam's poem "Lines Spoken in the Character of Pygmalion" from his work Remains in verse and prose of Arthur Henry Hallam: With a preface and memoir (1863)
- Robert Buchanan's poem "Pygmalion the Sculptor" in his work Undertones (1864)
- William Morris's poem "Earthly Paradise" in which he includes the section "Pygmalion and the Image" (1868)
- William Bell Scott's "Pygmalion"
- Thomas Woolner's long poem "Pygmalion" (1881)
- Frederick Tennyson's "Pygmalion" from Daphne and Other Poems (1891)
- Robert Graves's "Pygmalion to Galatea" (1926) and "Galatea and Pygmalion"

===== Scotland =====
- Andrew Lang's "The New Pygmalion or the Statue's Choice" (1911)
- Carol Ann Duffy's poem "Pygmalion's Bride" (1999)

===== Ireland =====
- Emily Henrietta Hickey's A Sculptor and Other Poems (1881)
- Patrick Kavanagh's "Pygmalion" (1938)
- Eiléan Ní Chuilleanáin's "Pygmalion's Image" (1991)

===== Germany =====
- Friedrich Schiller's poem "The Ideals" (Die Ideale) (1795–6)

===== United States =====
- Sara Jane Lippincott (Grace Greenwood)'s "Pygmalion" (1851)
- Elizabeth Stuart Phelps' "Galatea" from Harper's Weekly (1884)
- Edward Rowland Sill's "The Lost Magic" (1900)
- H.D.'s "Pygmalion" (1913–17)
- Genevieve Taggard's "Galatea Again" (1929)

==== Short stories ====
- Nathaniel Hawthorne's short story "The Birth-Mark" and his similar novella, Rappaccini's Daughter.
- H.P. Lovecraft's "Herbert West–Reanimator"
- Tommaso Landolfi's "La moglie di Gogol" ('The Wife of Gogol')
- John Updike's "Pygmalion"
- E. T. A. Hoffmann's "The Sandman"
- Jorge Luis Borges's "Las Ruinas Circulares" (Argentina)
- Isaac Asimov's short story "Galatea", in his collection Azazel, is a parody of the story in which a female sculptor sculpts her idea of the ideal man

==== Novels and plays ====
- William Hazlitt's Liber Amoris: or, the New Pygmalion (1823)
- Lloyd C. Douglas's novel Invitation To Live (1940)
- Richard Powers's novel Galatea 2.2
- Edith Wharton's House of Mirth
- Henry James' Portrait of a Lady (1880–81)
- George MacDonald's Phantastes
- George Bernard Shaw's play Pygmalion
- Edgar Neville's play Prohibido en otoño.
- Tawfiq el-Hakim's play Pygmalion
- William Schwenck Gilbert's play Pygmalion and Galatea
- Rousseau's play Pygmalion, scène lyrique, the first full melodrama
- Villiers de l'Isle-Adam's novel Tomorrow's Eve
- Jacinto Grau's play El Señor de Pigmalión (1921)
- William Shakespeare's play The Winter's Tale (1611)

=== Opera, ballet, and music ===
- The story of Pygmalion is the subject of Jean-Philippe Rameau's 1748 opera, Pigmalion.
- It was also the subject of Georg Benda's 1779 monodrama, Pygmalion.
- Ramler's poem Pygmalion was set to music as an aria by J.C.F.Bach in 1772, and as a cantata by Friedrich Benda in 1784.
- Pygmalion was the subject of Gaetano Donizetti's first opera, Il Pigmalione.
- Fromental Halévy wrote an opera Pygmalion in the 1820s, but it was not performed.
- Franz von Suppé composed an operetta Die schöne Galathée, which is based on the characters of Pygmalion and Galatea.
- The ballet Coppélia, about an inventor who makes a life-sized dancing doll, has strong echoes of Pygmalion.
- The choreographer Marius Petipa and the composer Prince Nikita Trubetskoi created a four-act ballet on the subject called Pygmalion, ou La Statue de Chypre. The ballet was revived in 1895 with the great ballerina Pierina Legnani.

=== Stage plays ===
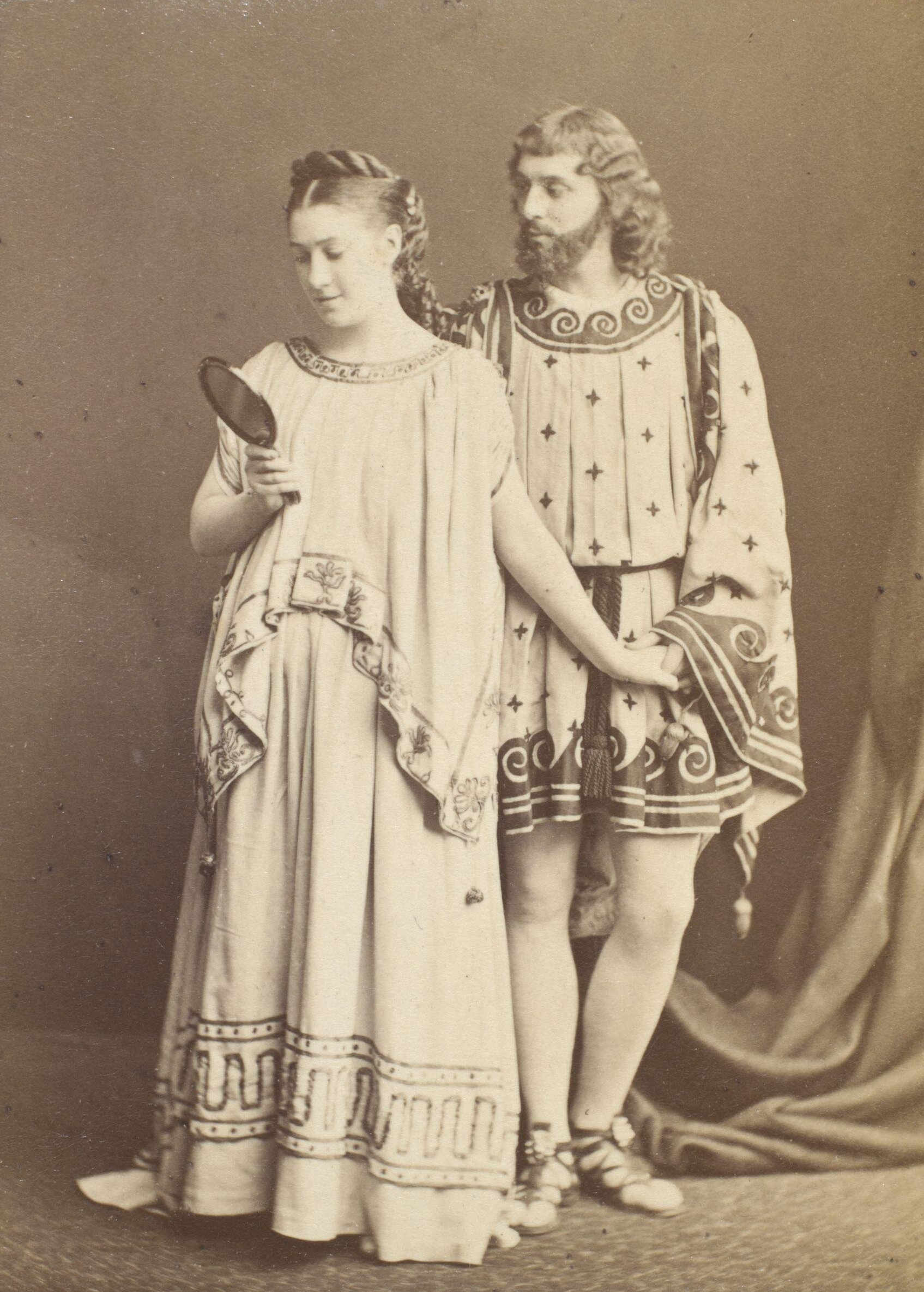
W. S. Gilbert's stage version, 1871

Though it is not based on the story of Pygmalion, Shakespeare's play Measure for Measure references Pygmalion in a line spoken by Lucio in Act 3, Scene 2: "What, is there none of Pygmalion's images, newly made woman, to be had now, for putting the hand in the pocket and extracting it clutch'd?"

There have also been successful stage-plays based upon the work, such as W. S. Gilbert's Pygmalion and Galatea (1871). It was revived twice, in 1884 and in 1888. The play was parodied by the musical 1883 burlesque Galatea, or Pygmalion Reversed, which was performed at the Gaiety Theatre with a libretto by Henry Pottinger Stephens and W. Webster, and a score composed by Wilhelm Meyer Lutz.

In January, 1872, Ganymede and Galatea opened at the Gaiety Theatre. This was a comic version of Franz von Suppé's Die schöne Galathee, coincidentally with Arthur Sullivan's brother, Fred Sullivan, in the cast.

In March 1872, William Brough's 1867 play Pygmalion; or, The Statue Fair was revived, and in May of that year, a visiting French company produced Victor Massé's Galathée.

George Bernard Shaw's Pygmalion (1912, staged 1913) owes something to both the Greek Pygmalion and the legend of "King Cophetua and the beggar maid"; in which a king lacks interest in women, but one day falls in love with a young beggar-girl and later educates her to be his queen. Shaw's comedy of manners in turn was the basis for the Broadway musical My Fair Lady (1956), as well as numerous other adaptations.

P. L. Deshpande's play Ti Fulrani ("Queen of Flowers") is also based on Shaw's Pygmalion. The play was a huge success in Marathi theater and has earned many accolades. Madhu Rye adapted Pygmalion in Gujarati as Santu Rangili (1976) which was successful.

==== Film ====
The 1987 American film Mannequin starts in ancient Egypt with a girl who doesn't want to marry a dung dealer, then the rest of the story happens in modern New York: a guy at a mannequin manufacturer makes a mannequin, but loses his job because it took him too long. She can only move or talk when no one else can see her; she helps him get a job dressing the window of a major store. The transformation is never explained in-story, it's a plot device in a quirky fantasy rom-com.

== See also ==
- Agalmatophilia
- Golem
- Hidari Jingorō
- Ilmarinen
- Narcissus
- Pinocchio
- Prometheus
- Pygmalion and the Image series
- Pygmalion effect
- Pygmalion of Tyre
- Uncanny valley
- Waifu
