= Pygmalion and the Image series =

Painting series by Edward Burne-Jones

Pygmalion and the Image: The Heart Desires
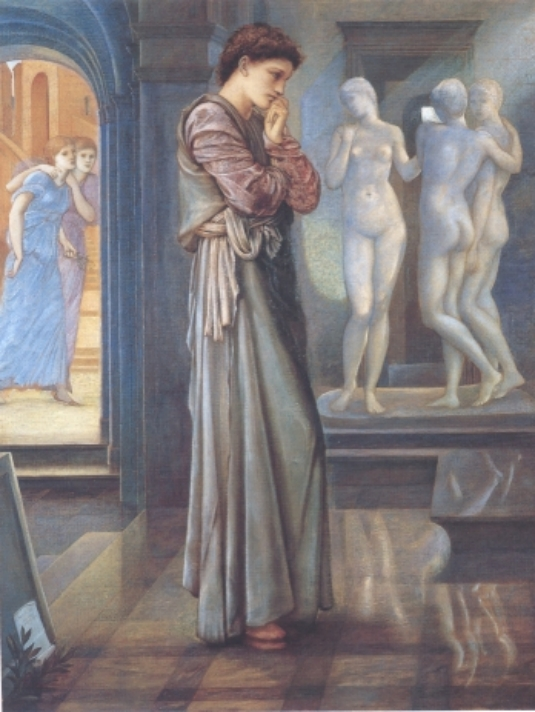
- 1st painting, 2nd series
- Artist: Edward Burne-Jones
- Year: 1875–78
- Medium: oil on canvas
- Dimensions: 99 cm × 76.3 cm (39 in × 30.0 in)
- Location: Birmingham Museum and Art Gallery

Pygmalion and the Image is the second series of four oil paintings in the Pygmalion and Galatea series by the British Pre-Raphaelite artist Edward Burne-Jones which was completed between 1875 and 1878. The two collections may be seen below, in the Gallery, the first being now owned by Lord Lloyd Webber, and the second housed at the Birmingham Museum & Art Gallery. This article deals with an appraisal of the second series.

== The second series ==
=== Pygmalion and Galatea I: The Heart Desires ===
As seen above right (1st image), this is the first of four paintings in the artist's second Pygmalion and Galatea series. This first series, which dates back to 1867–1870, used harsher tones, darker colours and less fluid lines – as may be seen in the Gallery below. This second version, despite being painted in oils, has the sheen and soft tones of chalk.

The story tells of Pygmalion, a sculptor of Cyprus, the birthplace of Aphrodite. It was first related in Ovid's Metamorphoses, although by the time of this series, William Morris had written his own version of the story.

Pygmalion is seen here in his studio, pondering his lonely life, having chosen to remain celibate in disgust at what he saw as the debauched lifestyles of the local women. The statues behind him (in emulation of the Three Graces) echo the curious women peering in through his doorway. All five seem fluid, languorous and unself-conscious. Pygmalion, looking above the proliferation of ankles, thighs and buttocks reflected on the floor and pedestal in front of him, is pondering his next creation. His gaze ignores the women around him as he sees in his mind a statue of the perfect female.

=== Pygmalion and Galatea II: The Hand Refrains ===
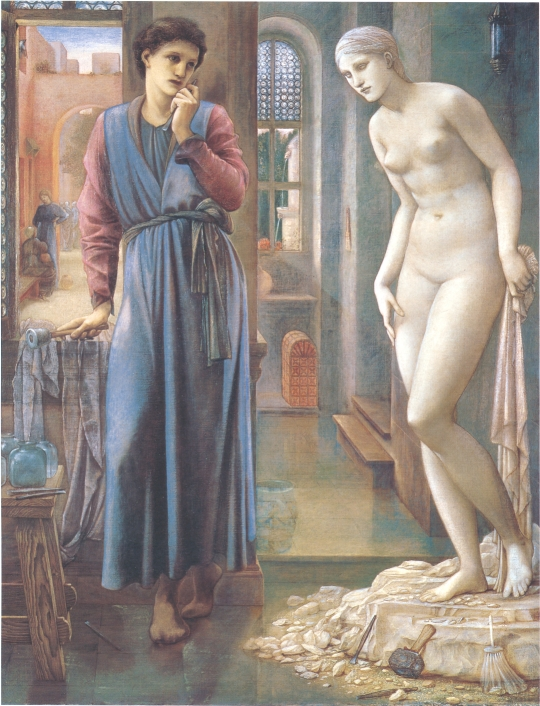
The Hand Refrains, 2nd Series, H.98.7 cm x W.76.3 cm (1878)

In this second picture, Pygmalion's perfect woman is revealed. Playing God, he has created woman and now stands back to admire her, holding the cold chisel against his face as though scared to touch his creation again. The sculptor's expression is softer than The Heart Desires – a look which betrays that he has fallen in love with a woman made of marble.

In spite of his scorning of Aphrodite, Pygmalion has created Galatea in a classical Venusian stance. However, unlike the three statues and two living women in the first picture above, Galatea appears embarrassedly conscious of her nudity – in the act of attempting to cover herself. Pygmalion, despite his contempt for the local women, deliberately created her nude and now takes on the role of voyeur. Although Pygmalion is seen looking, rather than touching, the various tools around the base of the statue show how much work he has done to bring the statue to this finished state. In creating Galatea, he has used a hard mallet, chisel and file as well as an almost transparent, soft-bristled brush.

=== Pygmalion and Galatea III: The Godhead Fires ===
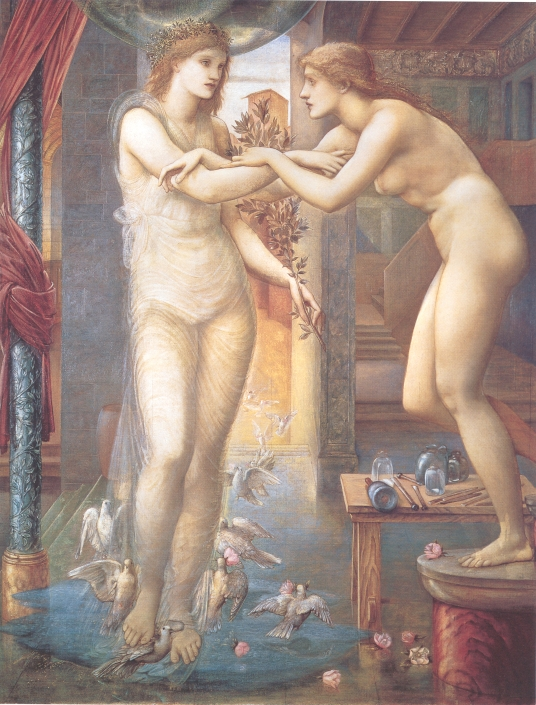
The Godhead Fires, 2nd Series, H.143.7 cm x W.116.8 cm (1878)

In Ovid's version of the story, the scene is set while Pygmalion is at the temple of Aphrodite, praying for forgiveness for the years he has shunned her and begging for a wife as perfect as his marble woman. In his absence, Aphrodite appears in the studio to impart life to Galatea. In physical terms, the painting shows little difference between the two women: the same, unattainable facial expression; the marble colouring; the Amazonian stature. Ironically, their interlaced arms and Aphrodite's penetrating gaze emulate the intertwined women, so despised by Pygmalion, in The Heart Desires.

Aphrodite is identified by the presence of doves and roses – symbols commonly linked with the goddess – and the water at her feet, reminiscent of her birth, fully formed, from the sea. This also represents Galatea's birth, fully formed, as a woman. In a scene that is strongly evocative of Michelangelo's Creation painting on the ceiling of the Sistine Chapel, the goddess adds colour and sensuality to Pygmalion's austere studio and Galatea's soft flesh. The rich-colour drapery, wrapped suggestively around an intricately carved pole at left, is noticeably absent from the other images in the series.

=== Pygmalion and Galatea IV: The Soul Attains ===
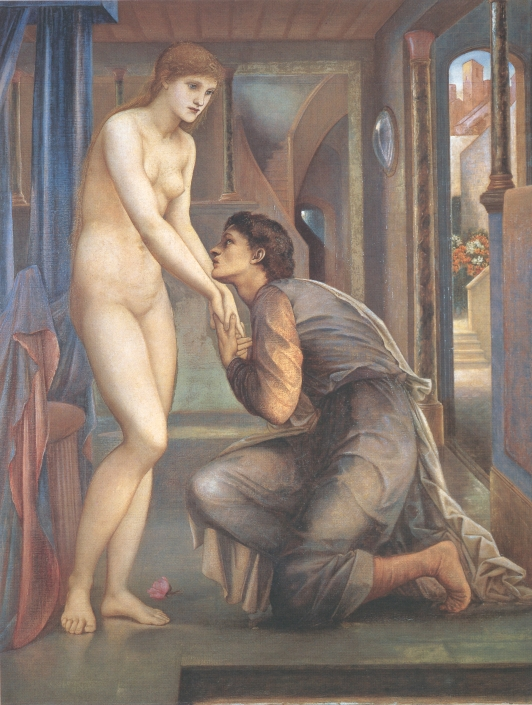
The Soul Attains, 2nd Series, H.99.4 cm x W.76.6 cm (1878)

When Pygmalion returns home, he finds that his statue has come to life and humbles himself at her feet.

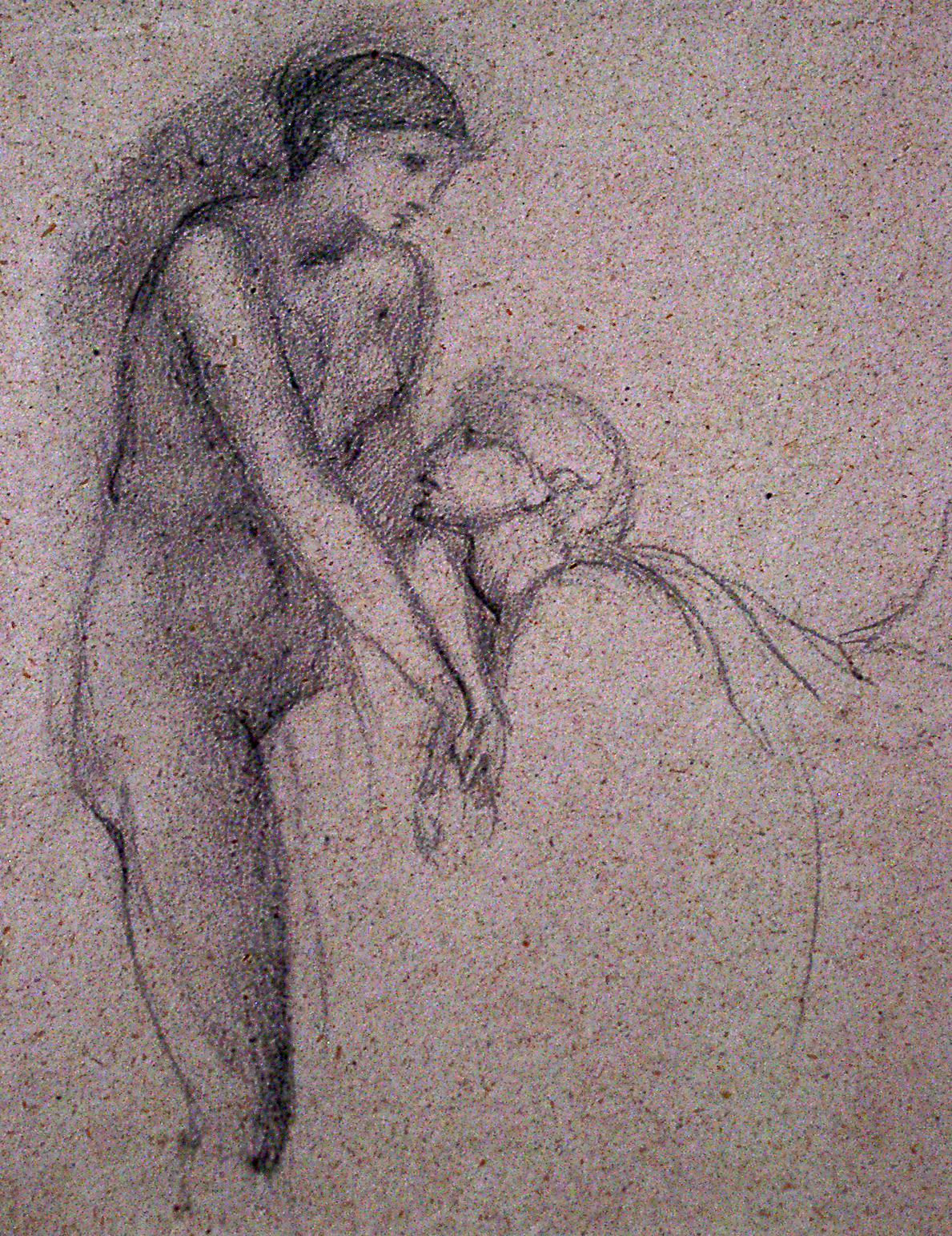
Study for The Soul Attains, in The New Art Gallery Walsall

This was not Burne-Jones' only series of pictures: others include The Briar Rose series (1885–1890), which was based on Charles Perrault's fairy tale, Sleeping Beauty (as retold by the Brothers Grimm), and Burne-Jones' spectacular Cupid and Psyche frieze. Although not imbued with the depth and texture of The Merciful Knight (1863), this second attempt at portraying the tale of Pygmalion and Galatea has become regarded as one of the artist's most important works. It was exhibited at Sir Coutt Lindsay's new Grosvenor Gallery in 1879, thereby establishing Burne-Jones as one of the leading artists in the burgeoning Aesthetic Movement.

A c. 1870 pencil-on-paper study for the work is in The New Art Gallery Walsall.

== Gallery ==
Pygmalion (first series)

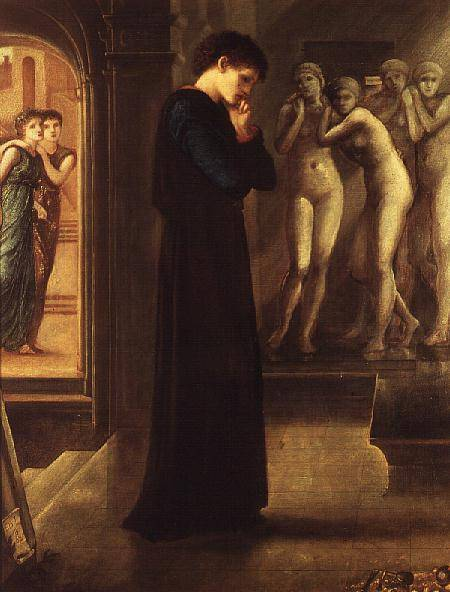
The Heart Desires, 1868–1870

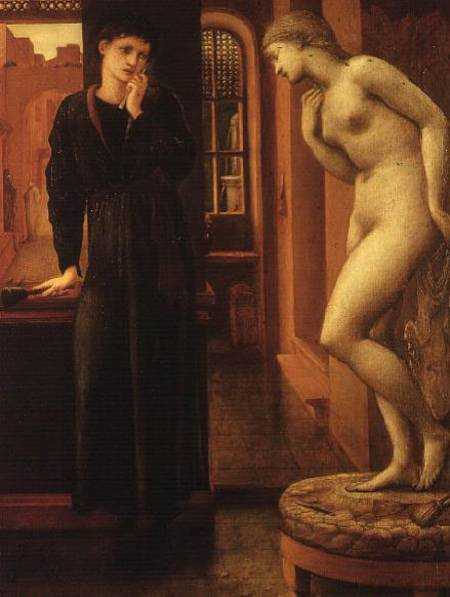
The Hand Refrains, 1868–1870

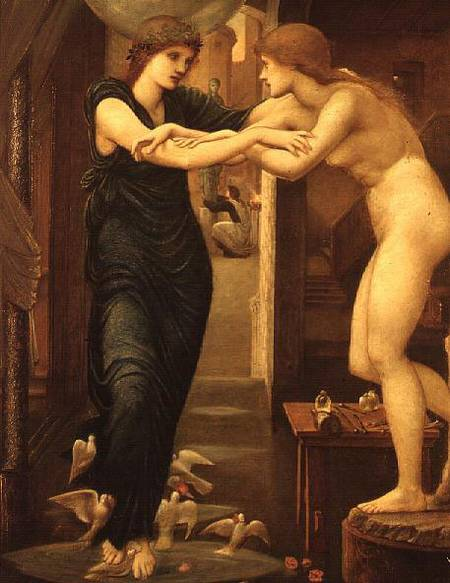
The Godhead Fires, 1868–1870

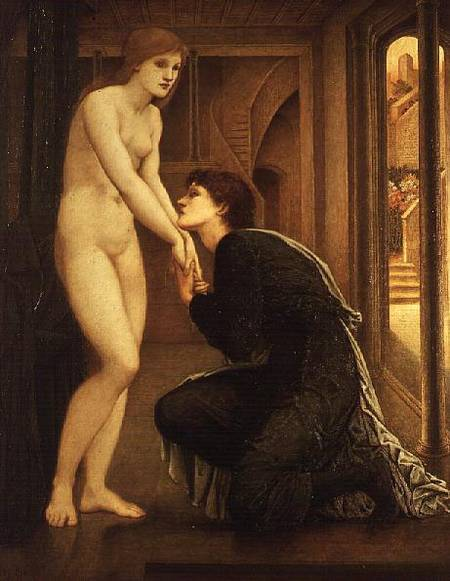
The Soul Attains, 1868–1870

Pygmalion and the Image (second series)

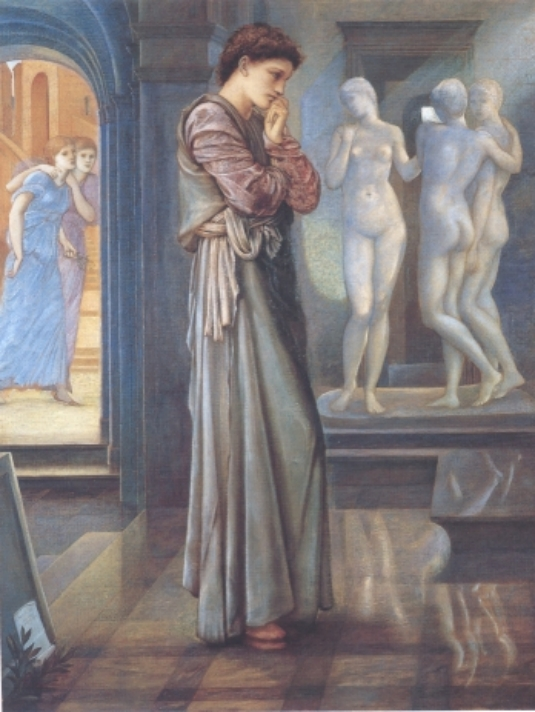
The Heart Desires, 1878

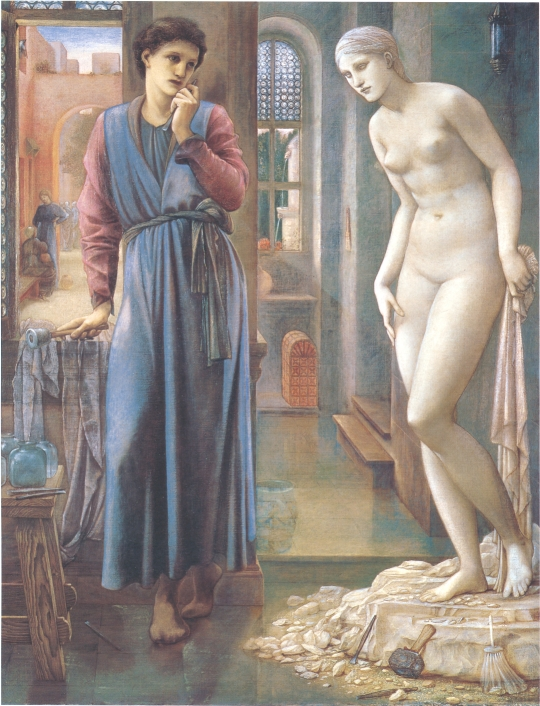
The Hand Refrains, 1878

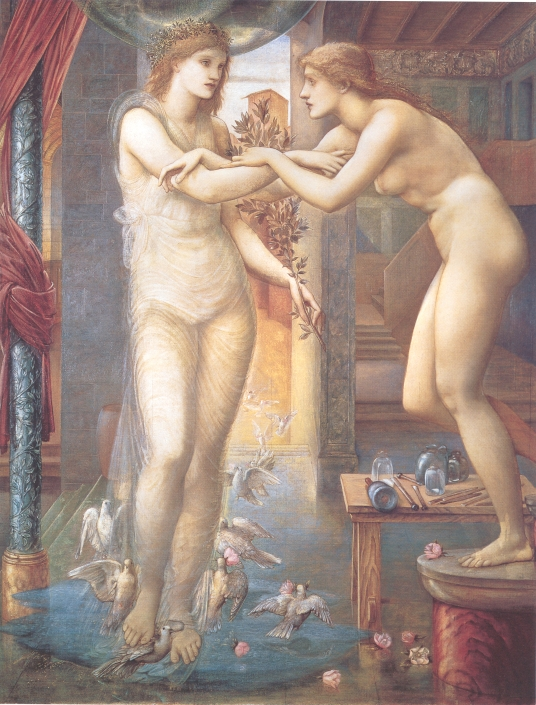
The Godhead Fires, 1878

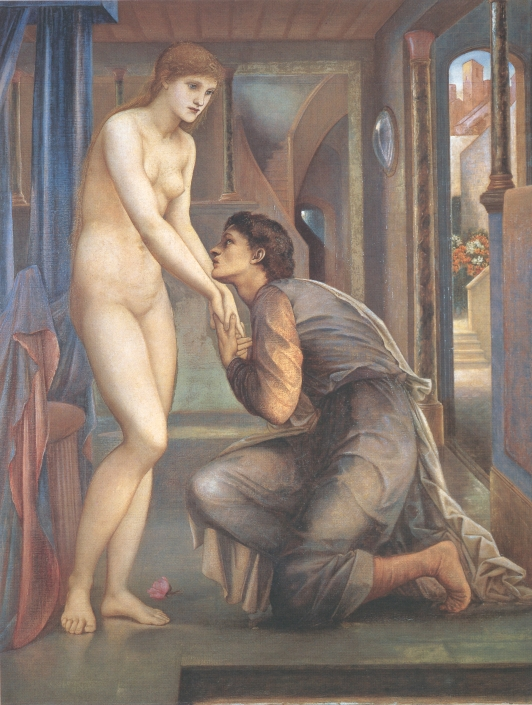
The Soul Attains, 1878

== See also ==
- List of paintings by Edward Burne-Jones
- Galatea (mythological statue) and Pygmalion (mythology)
- Pygmalion and Galatea, painting in several versions by Jean-Léon Gérôme
- Pygmalion and Galatea, a play by W. S. Gilbert
- Ovid's Metamorphoses
