= List of paintings by Edward Burne-Jones =

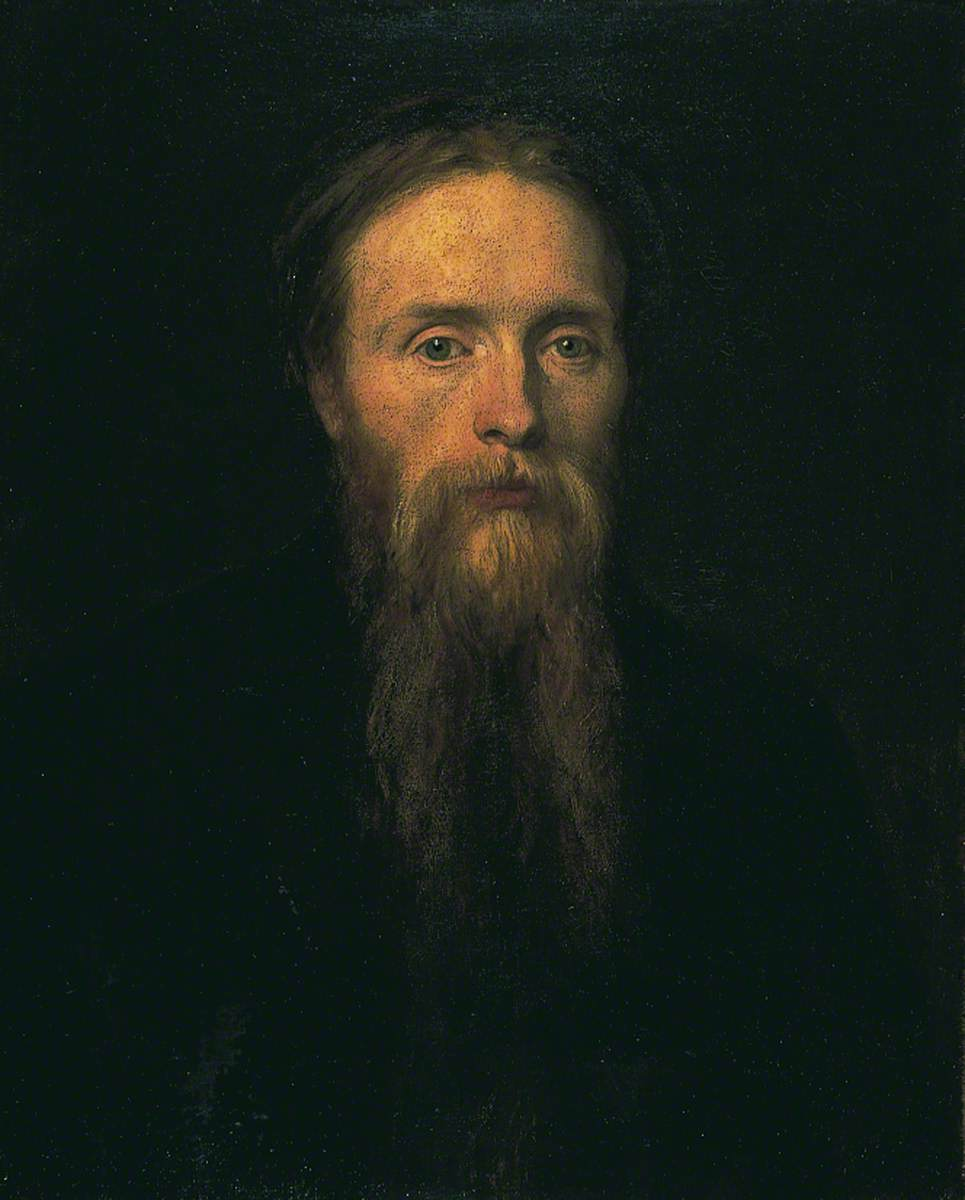
Portrait by George Frederic Watts

This is a list of the paintings of the British Pre-Raphaelite artist Edward Burne-Jones.

== 1850s ==
Image Title	Year	Location	Dimensions (cm.)	Medium
Arthur with Excalibur	1858	Private collection (likely)		
A Knight and his Lady	1859	Private collection (likely)		

== 1860s ==
- Girls in a Meadow (1860), private collection.
- Sidonia von Bork 1560 (1860), Tate Britain, London.
- Clara von Bork 1560 (1860), Tate Britain, London.
- Merlin and Nimue from 'Morte d'Arthur' (1861), Victoria and Albert Museum, London. Listed at Bridgeman Art Library.
- The Goldfish Pool or Girl and Goldfish (1861), Tullie House Museum, Carlisle.
- Clerk Saunders (1861), Tate Britain, London.
- The Annunciation and the Adoration of the Magi (1861), Tate Britain, London.
- The Backgammon Players (1861–62), Birmingham Museum & Art Gallery, Birmingham.
- Morgan le Fay (1862), Cecil French Bequest, London Borough of Hammersmith and Fulham.
- The Madness Of Sir Tristram (1862), private collection.
- King Mark and La Belle Iseult (1862), Birmingham Museum & Art Gallery, Birmingham.
- Fair Rosamund and Queen Eleanor (1862), Tate Britain, London.
- Cinderella (1863), Museum of Fine Arts, Boston.
- The Merciful Knight (1863), Birmingham Museum & Art Gallery, Birmingham.
- Astrologia (1865), private collection. Listed at Bridgeman Art Library.
- Princesse Sabra (1865), Musée d'Orsay, Paris.
- The Lament (1865), William Morris Gallery.
- The Prioress' Tale (1865–98), Delaware Art Museum.
- Cupid and Psyche (1865), Manchester Art Gallery, Manchester. Second version (c. 1865), Yale Centre for British Art, Hartford. Both listed at Bridgeman Art Library.
- The Garland: A Girl Tending Flowers (1866), Cecil French Bequest, London Borough of Hammersmith and Fulham.
- The Mirror of Venus (1866–1877), private collection. Later version, completed simultaneously:
  - 1873–1877 at the Calouste Gulbenkian Foundation, Lisbon.
- Charity (1867), private collection. Listed at Bridgeman Art Library.
- Cupid Delivering Psyche (1867), Cecil French Bequest, London Borough of Hammersmith and Fulham. Three later versions of the same subject (all listed at Bridgeman Art Library).
  - 1867 at the Cecil Higgins Art Gallery.
  - c1871 at Sheffield Galleries and Museums Trust.
  - date unknown, private collection.
- The Love Song (c. 1868–1873), Metropolitan Museum of Art, New York.
- Green Summer (1868), private collection. Listed at Bridgeman Art Library.
- Laus Veneris (1869), Laing Art Gallery, Newcastle upon Tyne.
- Autumn (1869–70), Roy Miles Fine Paintings. Listed at Bridgeman Art Library.

== 1870s ==
- Evening Star (1870), private collection. Listed at Bridgeman Art Library.
- Phyllis and Demophoon (1870), Birmingham Museum & Art Gallery, Birmingham.
- The Sleeping Beauty (1870–1873), Museo de Arte de Ponce, Puerto Rico. Study in Manchester Art Gallery, Manchester.
- The Wheel of Fortune (1870 onwards), there are at least seven versions of this composition including:
  - c.1870 at the Carlisle City Art Gallery, Carlisle.
  - c.1870 at the Watts Gallery, Compton.
  - 1871–1877 at the National Gallery of Victoria, Melbourne. and
  - 1871–1885 part of the Cecil French Bequest, London Borough of Hammersmith and Fulham.
  - 1877–1883 at the Musée d'Orsay, Paris.
  - c.1882 at the National Museum of Wales, Cardiff (unfinished).
- Fame (c.1870), Watts Gallery, Compton.
- Love or The Triumph of Love (c.1870), Watts Gallery, Compton.
- Oblivion (c.1870), Watts Gallery, Compton.
- Flying Figure (c.1870), Cecil French Bequest, London Borough of Hammersmith and Fulham.
- Day (1870), Fogg Art Museum, Harvard University.
- Night (1870), Fogg Art Museum, Harvard University.
- The Garden of Hesperides (1870–73), private collection.
- Spes or Hope (1871), Dunedin Public Art Gallery, Dunedin. Other versions of this subject:
  - 1872–1877 at the National Gallery of Victoria, Melbourne
  - 1896 at the Museum of Fine Arts, Boston.
- Dorigen of Bretaigne longing for the Safe Return of her Husband (1871), Victoria and Albert Museum, London. Listed at Bridgeman Art Library.
- Fides (1871), Vancouver Art Gallery.
- Venus Epithalamia (1871), Fogg Art Museum, Harvard University.
- Pan and Psyche (1872–1874), Fogg Art Museum, Harvard University. Second version in private collection. Both listed at Bridgeman Art Library.
- Danäe and the Brazen Tower (1872), Ashmolean Museum, Oxford. There are two later versions of this composition (both listed at Bridgeman Art Library):
  - Danaë Watching the Building of the Brazen Tower (1872), Fogg Art Museum, Harvard University
  - Danae or the Tower of Brass (1887–88), Glasgow Museums, Glasgow.
- The Beguiling of Merlin (1872–1877), Lady Lever Art Gallery, Port Sunlight.
- Psyche entering the Portals of Olympus (1872–1881), Birmingham Museum & Art Gallery, Birmingham.
- The Feast of Peleus (1872–1881), Birmingham Museum & Art Gallery, Birmingham.
- Troy Triptych (1872–1898), Birmingham Museum & Art Gallery, Birmingham.
- The Mirror of Venus (1875), Museu Calouste Gulbenkian, Lisbon.
- Frieze of Eight Women Gathering Apples (1876), Tate Britain, London.
- The Annunciation (1876), Lady Lever Art Gallery, Port Sunlight.
- Atlas Turned to Stone (c. 1876), Southampton City Art Gallery. Listed at Bridgeman Art Library.
- The Avenging Angel of St Catherine (1878), Cecil French Bequest, London Borough of Hammersmith and Fulham.
- An Angel Playing a Flageolet (1878), Sudley House, National Museums Liverpool. Two further versions exist one in an unidentified private collection and one in Makins Collection. All are listed at Bridgeman Art Library.
- A Musical Angel (c. 1878–1880), unknown.

== 1880s ==
- The Golden Stairs (1880), Tate Britain, London.
- Lady Frances Balfour (1880), Musée des Beaux-Arts de Nantes
- The Angel (1881), Glasgow Museums, Glasgow.
- The Last Sleep of Arthur in Avalon (1881), Museo de Arte de Ponce, Puerto Rico.
- Earth Mother (1882), Worcester Art Museum, Massachusetts. Second version in a private collection (both listed at Bridgeman Art Library.
- The Mermaid (1882), Tate Britain, London.
- The Mill (1882), Victoria and Albert Museum, London.
- The Tree of Forgiveness (1882), Lady Lever Art Gallery, Port Sunlight.
- The Magic Circle (c. 1882), Tate Britain, London.
- Georgiana Burne-Jones (1883), private collection (?).
- King Cophetua and the Beggar Maid (painting) (1884), Tate Britain, London.
- The Pilgrim at the Gate of Idleness (1884), Dallas Museum of Art.
- The Morning of the Resurrection (1886), Tate Britain, London.
- Sibylla Delphica (1886), Manchester Art Gallery, Manchester.
- The Garden of Pan (c. 1886), National Gallery of Victoria, Melbourne.
- The Depths of the Sea (1887), Fogg Art Museum, Harvard University.
- The Star of Bethlehem (1887–1891), Birmingham Museum & Art Gallery, Birmingham.
- The Nativity (1888), Carnegie Museum of Art, Pittsburgh.
- The King and the Shepherd (1888), Carnegie Museum of Art, Pittsburgh.
- The Heart of the Rose (1889), private collection.

== 1890s ==
Image	Title	Year	Collection
	Sponsa de Libano	1891	Walker Art Gallery, Liverpool
	The Sirens	1891-1898	Ringling Museum of Art, Florida.
	Vespertina Quies	1893	Tate Britain, London.
	Love Among the Ruins	1894	Wightwick Manor, Wolverhampton
	Fall of Lucifer	1894	The Ashmolean Museum, Oxford. (On loan from Lord Lloyd Webber's private collection)
	Psyche's Wedding	1895	Royal Museums of Fine Arts of Belgium.
	The Dream of Launcelot at the Chapel of the San Graal	1895	Southampton City Art Gallery, Southampton.
	Hope	1896	Museum of Fine Arts, Boston.
	Aurora	1896	Brisbane Gallery of Modern Art, Brisbane.
	The Wizard	1896-1898	Birmingham Museum & Art Gallery, Birmingham.
	Love and the Pilgrim	1896-97	Tate Britain, London.

== Series ==
=== The Legend of St George and the Dragon (1865–1867) ===
A series of seven works:
No.	Image	Title	Collection
1		The King's Daughter	Musée d'Orsay, Paris
2		The Petition to the King	Hanover College, Indiana
3		The Princess Drawing the Lot	Hanover College, Indiana
4		The Princess Sabra Led to the Dragon	Private collection
5		The Princess Tied to the Tree	Private collection
6		St George Slaying the Dragon	Art Gallery of New South Wales, Sydney. Second version, 1868, in the William Morris Gallery
7		The Return of the Princess	Bristol City Museum and Art Gallery, Bristol

=== The Legend of Briar Rose (1885–1890) ===
Farringdon Collection Trust, Buscot Park, Oxfordshire. Four major paintings with 10 "joining panels":

1. Briars
2. The Briar Wood (1st major painting)
3. Briars
4. Briars, with Helmet and Greave
5. A Terrace, with a Curtain hanging before a flowering Briar
6. The Council Chamber (2nd major painting)
7. A Terrace, with a Curtain hanging before a flowering Briar
8. A Stone Hall with flowering Briars
9. The Garden Court (3rd major painting)
10. A Stone Hall with flowering Briars
11. A Stone Kitchen overgrown with Briars
12. A Kitchen with a Cupboard overgrown with Briars
13. The Rose Bower (4th major painting)
14. A Kitchen, with a Basin, Towel and Briars

=== Small Briar Rose series (1871–1873) ===
Museo de Arte de Ponce, Puerto Rico.

- The Briar Wood
- The Council Chamber
- The Rose Bower

=== Third Briar Rose series ===
- The Garden Court, Bristol City Museum and Art Gallery, Bristol.
- The Council Chamber, Delaware Art Museum, Wilmington.
- The Rose Bower, Hugh Lane Gallery of Modern Art, Dublin.

=== The Days of Creation (1870–1876) ===
Fogg Art Museum, Harvard University:

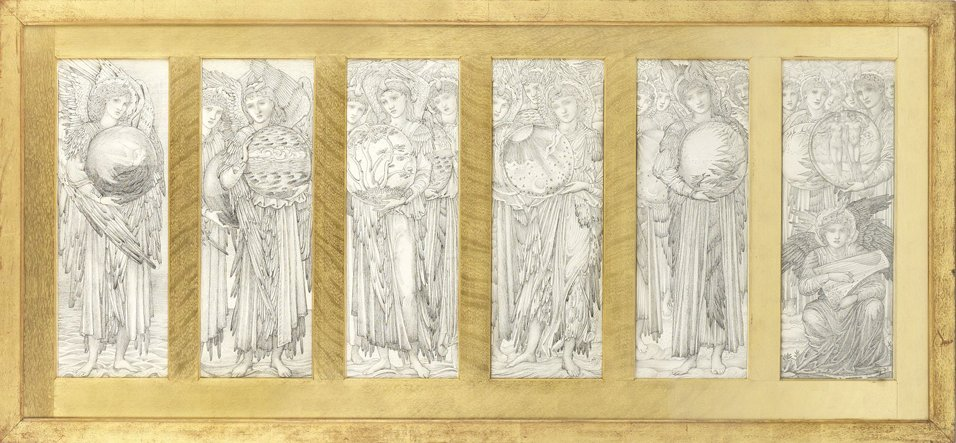
Pencil study

Image	Title
	The First Day
	The Second Day
	The Third Day
	The Fourth Day
	The Fifth Day
	The Sixth Day

=== Pygmalion Series (1868–1870) ===
Joseph Setton Collection (private), Paris – now owned by Lord Lloyd Webber:

No.	Image	Title
1		The Heart Desires
2		The Hand Refrains
3		The Godhead Fires
4		The Soul Attains

=== Pygmalion and the Image Series or "Pygmalion and Galatea Series" (1875–1878) ===
Birmingham Museum & Art Gallery, Birmingham:

No.	Image	Title
1		The Heart Desires
2		The Hand Refrains
3		The Godhead Fires
4		The Soul Attains

=== The Perseus Cycle (1875-1890s) ===
Only four of the paintings were completed in oil, although full size gouache studies were rendered of all the images.

1. The Call of Perseus, full size study in Southampton Art Gallery.
2. Perseus and the Graiae completed work in oil at Staatsgalerie, Stuttgart. Study in private collection, sketches at the Cecil Higgins Gallery and a full size study Southampton Art Gallery.
3. The Arming of Perseus or Perseus and the Nereids (Sea Nymphs), study in Southampton Art Gallery.
4. The Finding of Medusa, full size study in Southampton Art Gallery.
5. The Death of Medusa, full size study in Southampton Art Gallery.
6. The Birth of Pegasus and Chrysaor, full size study in Southampton Art Gallery.
7. The Rock of Doom, completed work in oil at Staatsgalerie, Stuttgart; full size study in Southampton Art Gallery.
8. The Doom Fulfilled, completed work in oil at Staatsgalerie, Stuttgart; full size study in Southampton Art Gallery. Perseus and Andromeda (1876) Art Gallery of South Australia, Adelaide. Same composition as Doom Fulfilled.
9. The Baleful Head, completed work in oil at Staatsgalerie, Stuttgart; full size study in Southampton Art Gallery.
10. Atlas turned to Stone, full size study in Southampton Art Gallery

== Portraits ==
- Portrait of Lady Lewis (1870), private collection.
- Portrait of Maria Zambaco (1870)
- Portrait of La Baronne Madeleine Desandes (1895–96), National Gallery of Victoria, Melbourne. Second version in a private collection (both listed at Bridgeman Art Library).
- Portrait of Katie Lewis (1886),

== Undated ==
- The Temple of Love, Tate Britain, London.
- Flamma Vestalis, Fogg Art Museum, Harvard University.
- Venus Discordia, National Museum of Wales, Cardiff (unfinished).
- Heart of the Rose. Listed at Bridgeman Art Library.

== See also ==
- List of Pre-Raphaelite paintings
