= The Wheel of Fortune (Burne-Jones) =

1875-1883 painting by Edward Burne-Jones

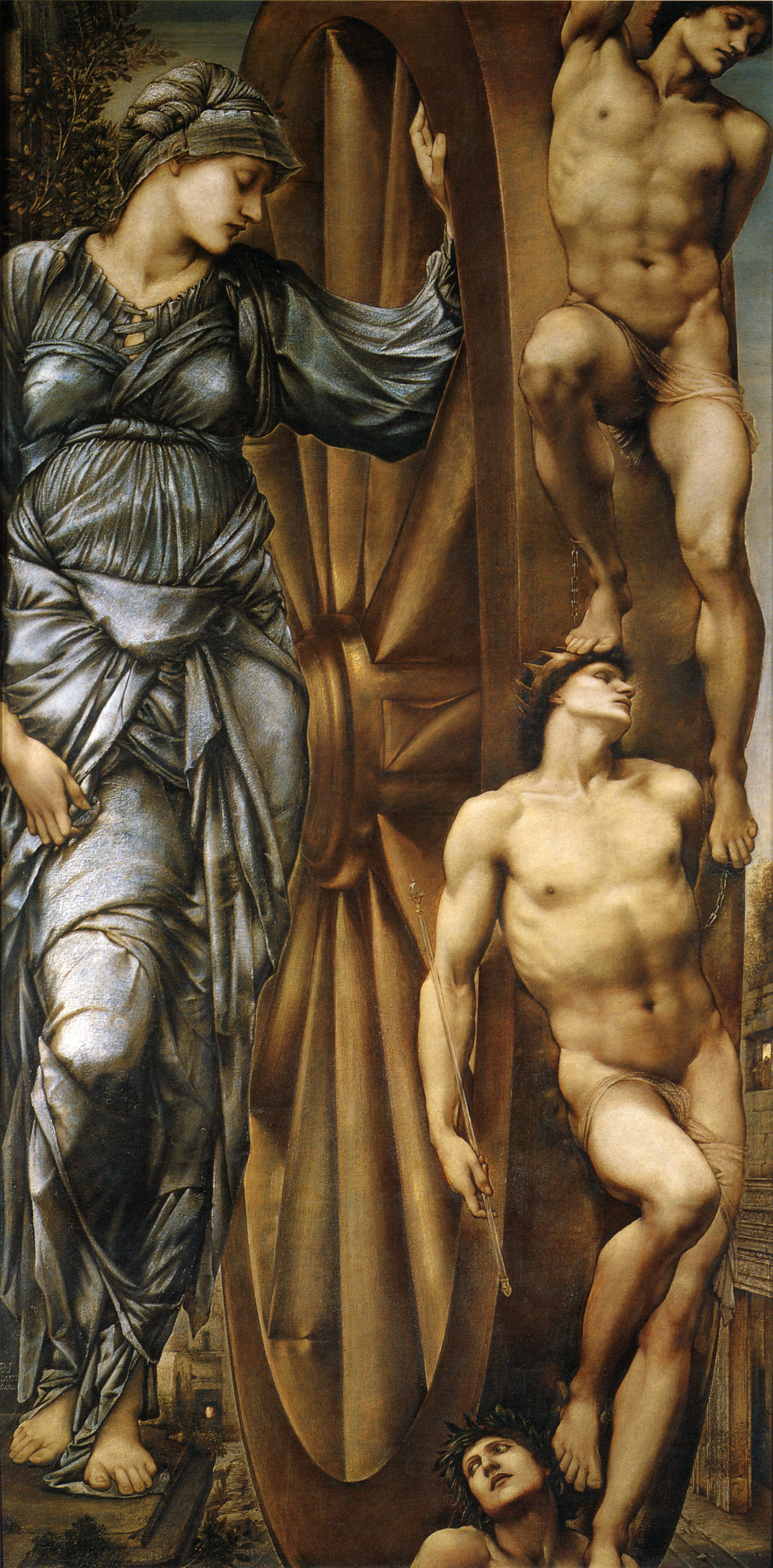
- Artist: Edward Burne-Jones
- Year: 1875–1883
- Medium: oil on canvas
- Movement: Pre-Raphaelite Brotherhood
- Dimensions: 200 cm × 100 cm (79 in × 39 in)
- Location: Musée d'Orsay; Paris

The Wheel of Fortune is an oil painting on canvas by the British Pre-Raphaelite painter Edward Burne-Jones, made from 1875 to 1883. The painting combines classical and medieval themes to present an allegory of the vagaries of life, a vanitas, with individual lives elevated or cast down as the wheel of fortune turns. Burne-Jones commented: "My wheel of Fortune is a true-to-life image; it comes to fetch each of us in turn, then it crushes us." The prime version has been in the collection of the Musée d'Orsay in Paris since 1980.

== Prime version ==
The painting measures 200 cm × 100 cm (79 in × 39 in), with its frame, 259 cm × 151.5 cm (102.0 in × 59.6 in). It employs a dull palette of greys, browns, greens and blues. It was originally conceived as part of the predella for an unrealised triptych on the Fall of Troy.

The tall frame is filled by a gigantic spoked wooden wheel, turned by a giant personification of the goddess Fortune standing in a contrapposto position, wrapped in the voluminous folds of a metallic blue classical gown, head swathed in a matching cloth, with closed eyes cast down. Three smaller male nudes are being carried around by the wheel: at the top, a slave standing on the head of the second, a king with a crown and sceptre, and at the bottom the head and shoulders of a poet with laurel wreath, looking towards Fortune's feet. The nude male figures were influenced by Michelangelo's paintings at the Sistine Chapel. The wheel and the figures fill most of the composition, but fragments of a wall and a tree can be seen in the top left, with a small patch of grey sky.

The completed painting was exhibited at the Grosvenor Gallery in London in 1883, and acquired that year by the politician Arthur Balfour, who later served as British Prime Minister and was created 1st Earl of Balfour in 1922. It was exhibited at the Royal Jubilee Exhibition in Manchester in 1887, the Brussels International Exposition in 1897 and at a Burne-Jones exhibition at the New Gallery in London in 1898.

After Balfour's death in 1930, it was inherited by his brother, Gerald Balfour, 2nd Earl of Balfour, and sold in 1932 to the vicomte Charles de Noailles, who gave it to his daughter Nathalie de Noailles. It was acquired by the French state in 1980, and allocated to the Musée d'Orsay in Paris.

== Other versions ==
A second, smaller version in oils on canvas, painted from 1871 to 1885, is in the National Gallery of Victoria in Melbourne, Australia. Measuring 151.4 cm × 72.5 cm (59.6 in × 28.5 in), it was acquired as part of the Felton Bequest in 1909. It is displayed in a heavy gilded tabernacle-style frame, a modern reconstruction based on fragments of the original, which has a decorative frieze with candelabrum ornament and egg and dart outer border, similar to those of other Burne-Jones paintings such as his Vespertina Quies (1893) in Tate Britain.

National Museum Cardiff has an unfinished version from about 1882, and preparatory sketches are in the Lady Lever Art Gallery.

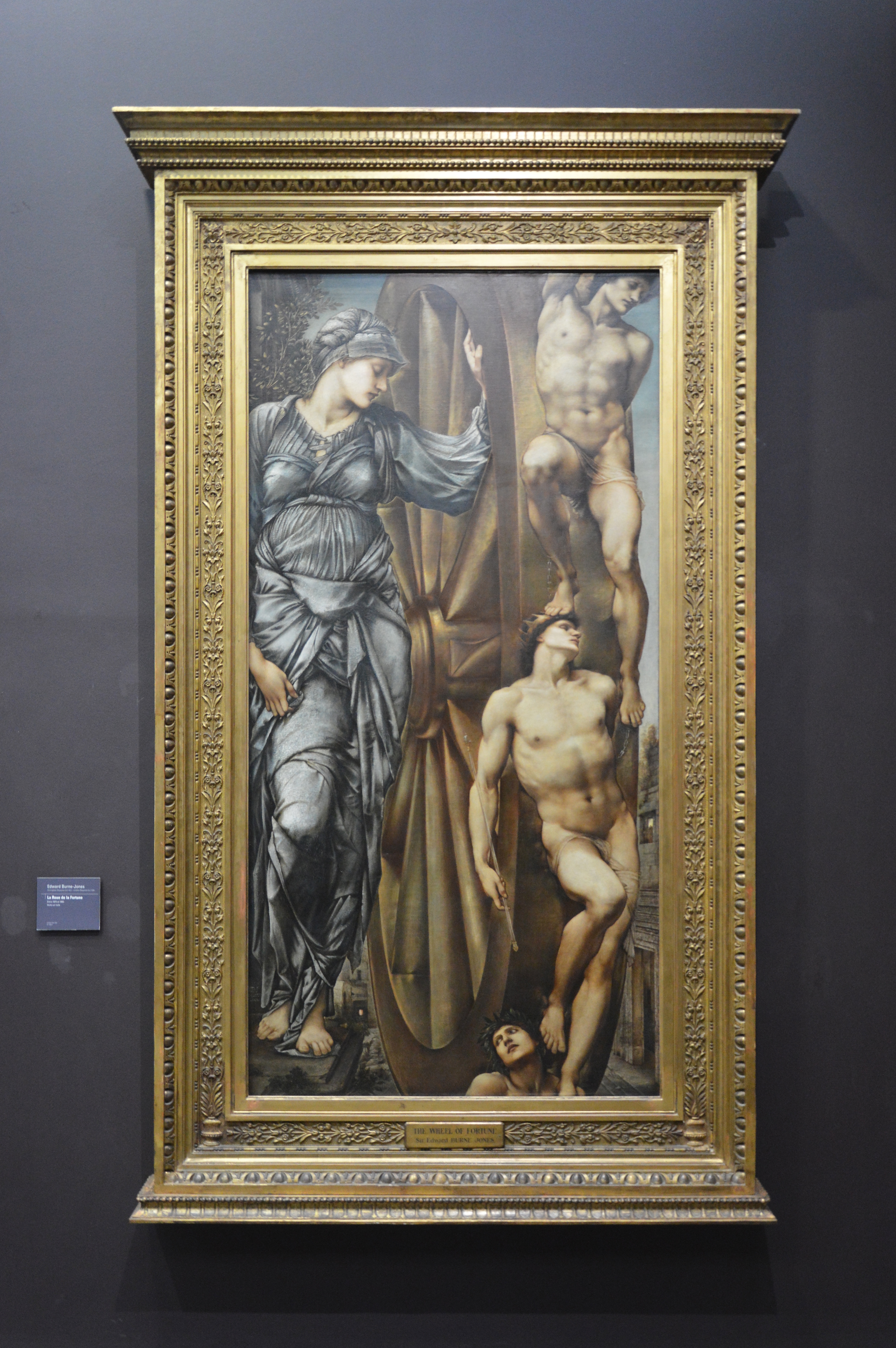
The prime version in its frame in the Musée d'Orsay

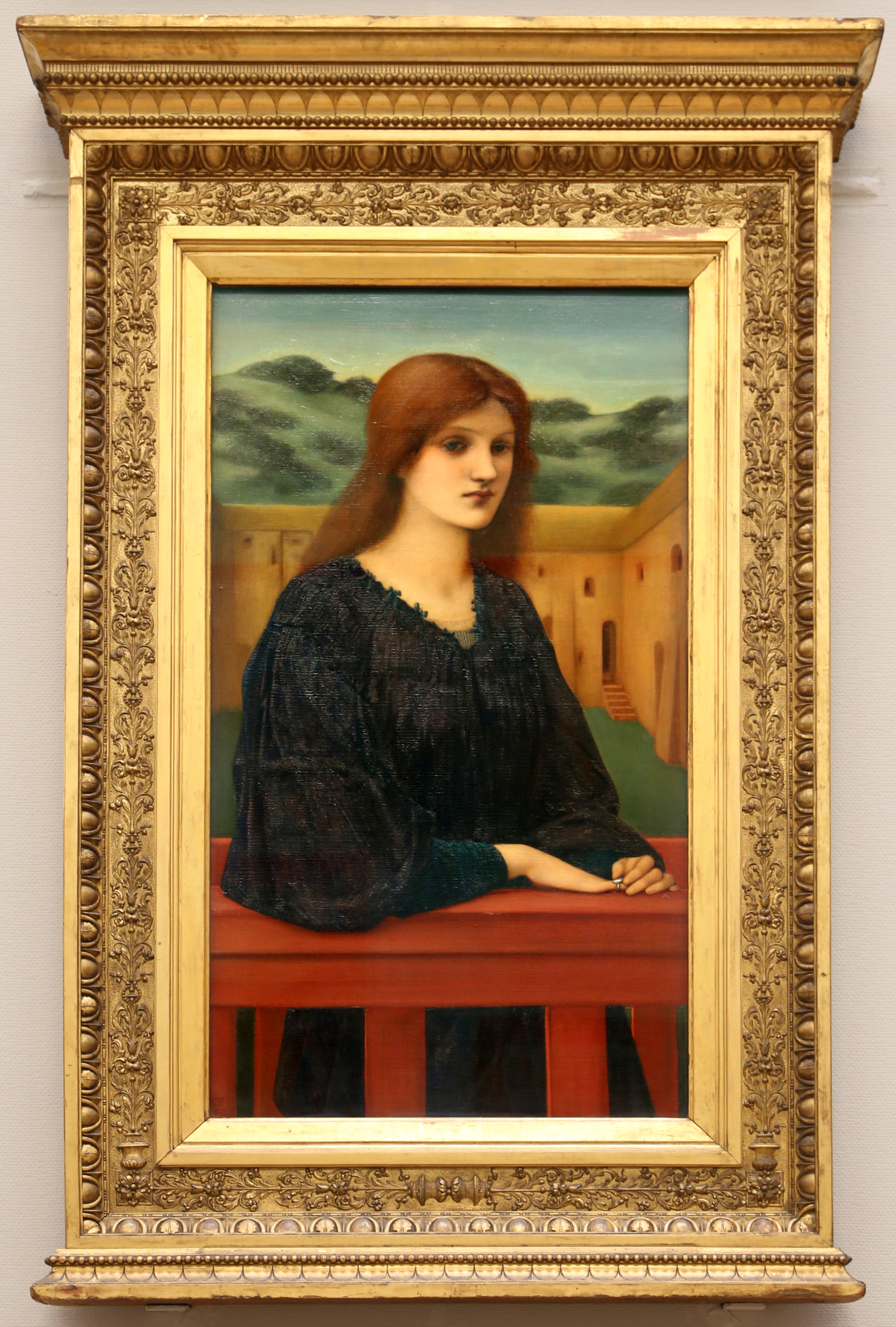
Vespertina Quies, 1893, in Tate Britain

== See also ==
- List of paintings by Edward Burne-Jones
