= Love Among the Ruins (Burne-Jones) =

Painting by Edward Burne-Jones

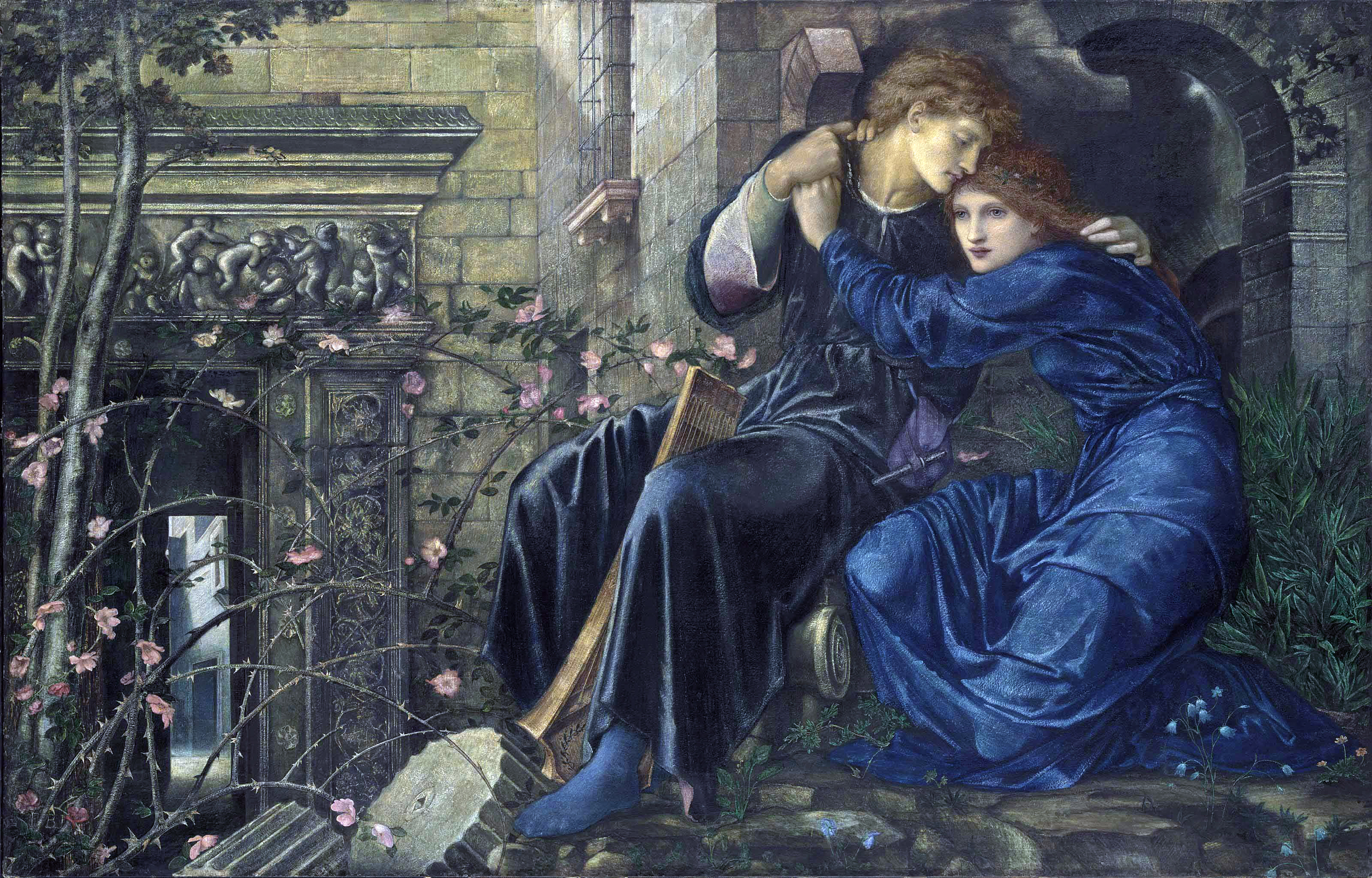
- Artist: Edward Burne-Jones
- Year: 1870년-1873년
- Medium: gouache paint and gum arabic on paper
- Dimensions: 96.5 cm × 152.4 cm (38.0 in × 60.0 in)
- Location: Private collection

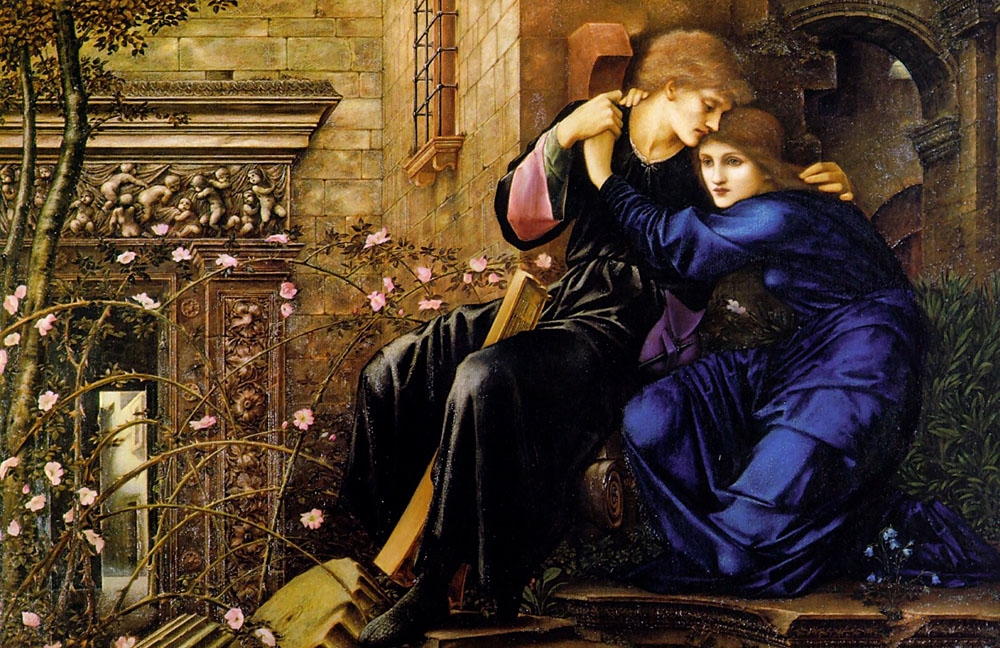
Oil painting, 1894, now in the National Trust collection at Wightwick Manor

Love Among the Ruins is a painting by English artist Edward Burne-Jones which exists in two versions, a watercolour completed in 1873 (damaged in 1893 and restored in 1898) and an oil painting completed in 1894. It depicts a man and a woman amid ruined architecture. The work is a synthesis of influences from the Pre-Raphaelite, Symbolist and Aesthetic art movements. The ambiguous scene without a clear narrative is considered one of Burne-Jones' best works.

== Description ==
The title refers to Robert Browning's poem Love Among the Ruins, published in Men and Women in 1855. The subtext is the ending of Burne-Jones' four-year love affair with his model Maria Zambaco. She attempted to commit suicide in the Regent's Canal in 1869 after he attempted to end their affair.

The work depicts two lovers in blue robes, a man and a woman, seated together on a stone capital amid the ruins of buildings. A broken column is at their feet, covered with briar rose, perhaps an allusion to Burne-Jones' Briar Rose series. In the background is a door with a frieze of putti, and arches leading into the distance. The setting may be influenced by the ruins of Polyandrion from the Hypnerotomachia Poliphili, published in 1499 and attributed to Francesco Colonna.

When sold at Christie's in 2013, the lot essay identified the models as the Italians Alessandro di Marco and Antonia Caiva. Others have suggested that they may be Maria Zambaco and Gaetano Meo. The model in the second version may be Bessie Keeane. Whoever the models are, the male and female figures are taken to allude to Burne-Jones himself and his lover Maria Zambaco.

== Watercolour ==
The watercolour was painted on paper from 1870 to 1873 at the studio of John Roddam Spencer Stanhope at Little Campden House, on Campden Hill in Kensington. It was made from watercolour mixed with gouache and gum arabic, giving it a finished appearance resembling an oil painting. It measures 96.5 cm × 152.4 cm (38.0 in × 60.0 in) (37.9″ x 60 ″) and is signed with the initials "EBJ" to the lower left, and signed "Edward Burne Jones" on the backboard. The backboard bears the typed inscription "This Picture, being painted in WATER/COLOUR, would be injured by the slight-/est moisture./Great care must be used whenever/it is removed from the Frame".

While he was working on the painting, Burne-Jones painted a miniature watercolour version in 1872 for William Morris's calligraphic manuscript of Edward FitzGerald's translation of The Rubáiyát of Omar Khayyám.

The completed full-size watercolour was first exhibited at the Dudley Gallery at the Egyptian Hall, Piccadilly in 1873, alongside another watercolour, The Garden of the Hesperides (now in the Kunsthalle Hamburg). It was one of few works that Burne-Jones exhibited after his indignant withdrew from the Old Watercolour Society in 1870, over the negative reception of his watercolour of Phyllis and Demophoön (which included a full-frontal naked male figure and a portrait of his mistress Maria Zambaco), and before he started to exhibit at the Grosvenor Gallery when it opened in 1877. It was an immediate critical and popular success. Burne-Jones himself rated it very highly, and it was praised by George du Maurier as "very stunning - almost the best thing he's done". Writing later, Julia Cartwright has said it was "one of the master's most perfect and beautiful creations", and Malcolm Bell called it "the most impressive of the painter's works, with its vague hint of an untold tragedy that haunts the memory".

Love Among the Ruins and The Garden of Hesperides were bought from the artist in 1873 by his patron the Manchester businessman Fredrick Craven. Love Among the Ruins was lent for exhibition at the 1878 Exposition Universelle in Paris, the inaugural exhibition at the Birmingham Museum and Art Gallery in 1885, the Royal Jubilee Exhibition in Manchester in 1887, and for exhibition at the Guildhall, London and then at the Burne-Jones retrospective at the New Gallery both in 1892.

After Burne-Jones' 1884 painting King Cophetua and the Beggar Maid was a great success at the 1889 Exposition Universelle in Paris, Love Among the Ruins was lent for exhibition at the Société Nationale des Beaux-Arts in 1893. While back in Paris, the prominent label warning that it was a watercolour and so susceptible to water damage was ignored, and an egg white wash was applied at the Goupil Gallery as a temporary varnish while the painting was being prepared for reproduction in photogravure.

The watercolour was thought to be damaged beyond repair, and remained in Burne-Jones' studio for five years, turned against the wall. At the suggestion of the owner and his former assistant Charles Fairfax Murray, Burne-Jones was eventually persuaded in 1898 to attempt a restoration, using ox gall to remove the egg white and then repainting the damaged head of the woman. The restoration was completed in May 1898, just a few weeks before his death in June 1898.

The work was sold at Christie's in London in March 1908 for 1,575 guineas. Acquired by the art dealer Agnew's, it passed through several collections before being sold at Sotheby's in London in May 1958 for 480 guineas, and it was acquired by Agnew's again. The original watercolour was auctioned again at Christie's in London in July 2013. Estimated at £3m to £5m, it sold for £14.8m, then the highest sale price for a Pre-Raphaelite work. It is now in a private collection.

== Oil painting ==
Distraught that his treasured watercolour was irretrievably damaged in Paris in 1893, Burne-Jones immediately painted a second version in oils, which was exhibited at the New Gallery in 1894. The oil painting measures 95.3 cm × 160 cm (37.5 in × 63.0 in). It is signed and dated, bottom right: "EBJ 1894". A hand-written note by Burne-Jones on the back of the painting reads: "This oil painting of ‘Love Among the Ruins’ is the same design as the one of the same name which I painted in watercolours, twenty one years ago, but which was destroyed in August last year. The present picture I began at once, and have made it as like as possible to the other, and have finished it this day. APRIL 23. 1894.Edward Burne Jones."

The second painting was in the collection of Mrs Robert Henry Benson by 1898. It was sold at Christie's in 1913, and acquired by Sir Marcus Samuel, 1st Viscount Bearsted. Inherited by his son Walter Samuel, 2nd Viscount Bearsted, it was donated to the National Trust in 1948, since when it has been exhibited among the Arts and Crafts interior décor and Pre-Raphaelite paintings of Geoffrey Mander at Wightwick Manor, in Wolverhampton.

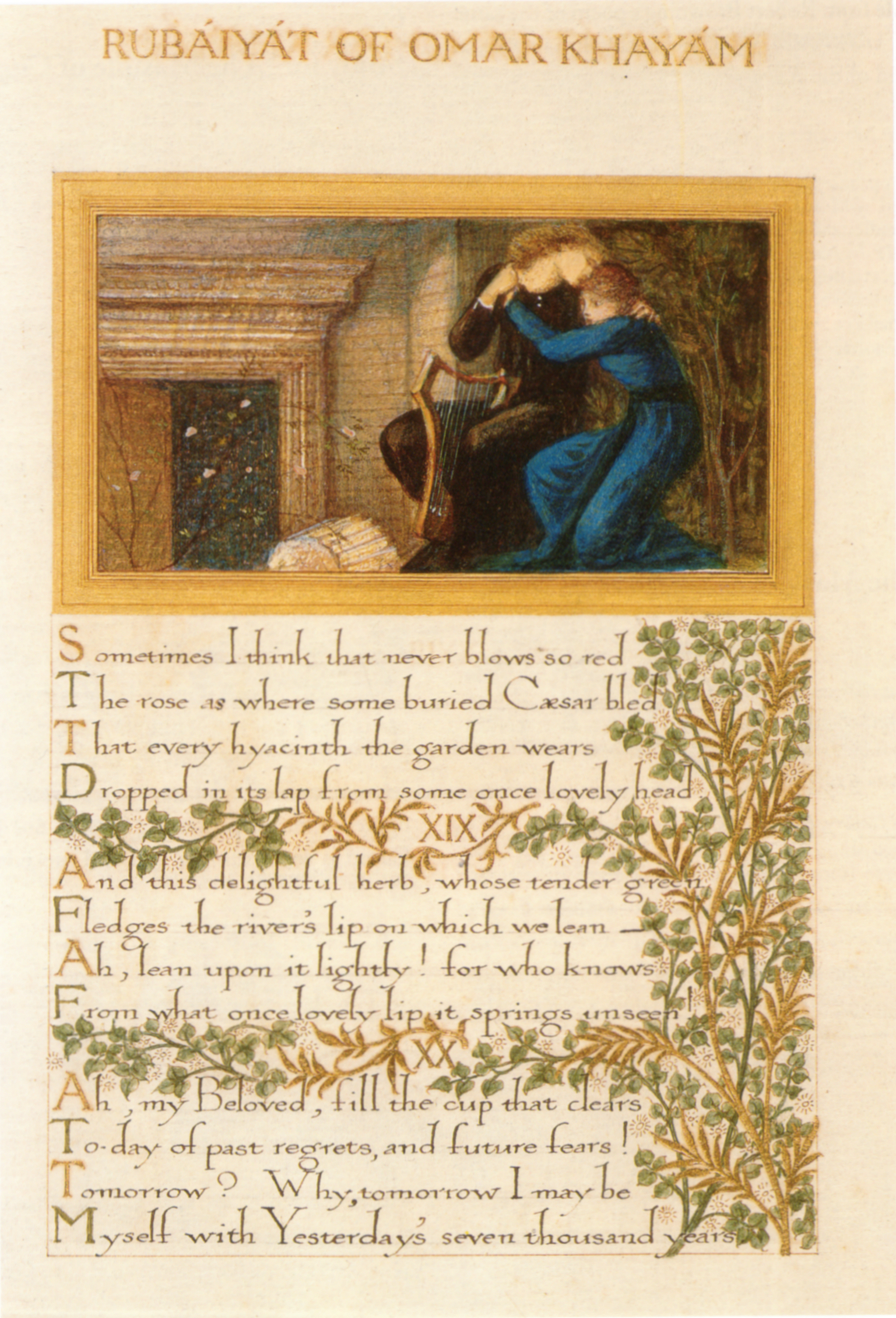
Illustration from an illuminated manuscript of The Rubáiyát of Omar Khayyám

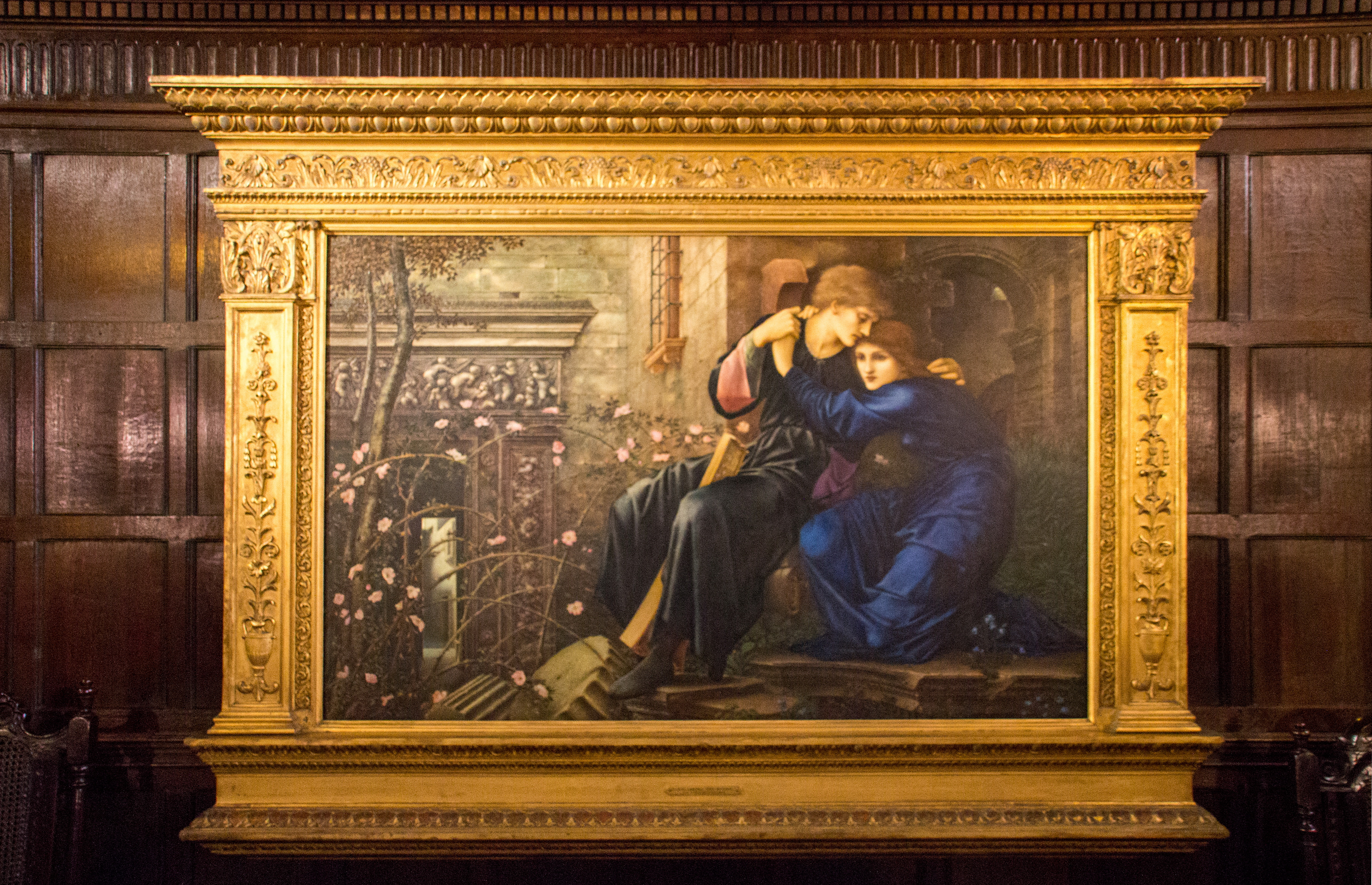
Oil painting displayed at Wightwick Manor

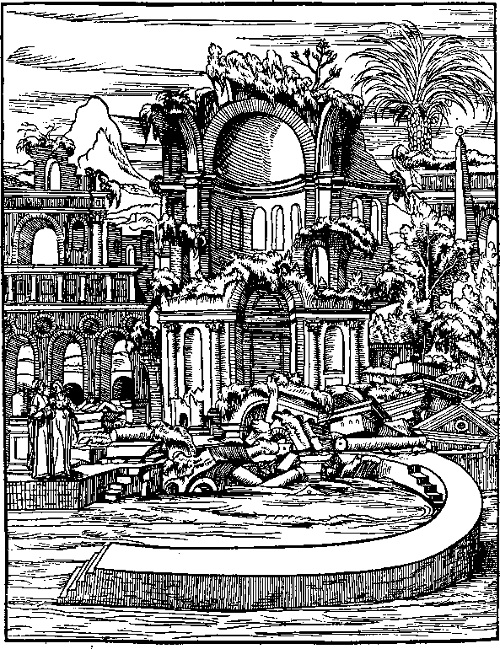
Illustration from the Hypnerotomachia Poliphili ("The Dreanm of Poliphilus"), published in 1499 and attributed to Francesco Colonna

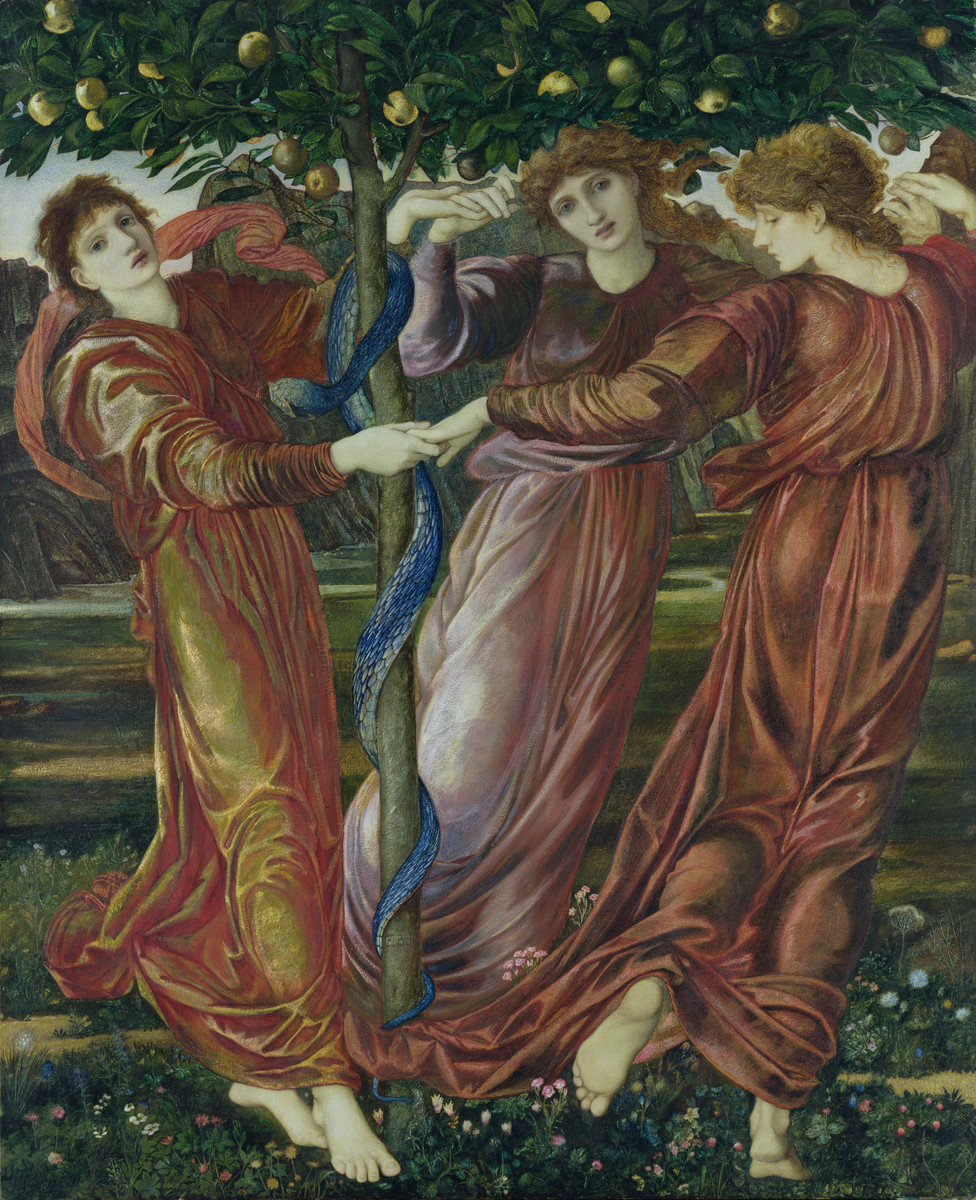
Edward Burne-Jones, Garden of the Hesperides, 1869–1873, Hamburger Kunsthalle

== See also ==
- List of paintings by Edward Burne-Jones
