= Sponsa de Libano =

1891 painting by Edward Burne-Jones

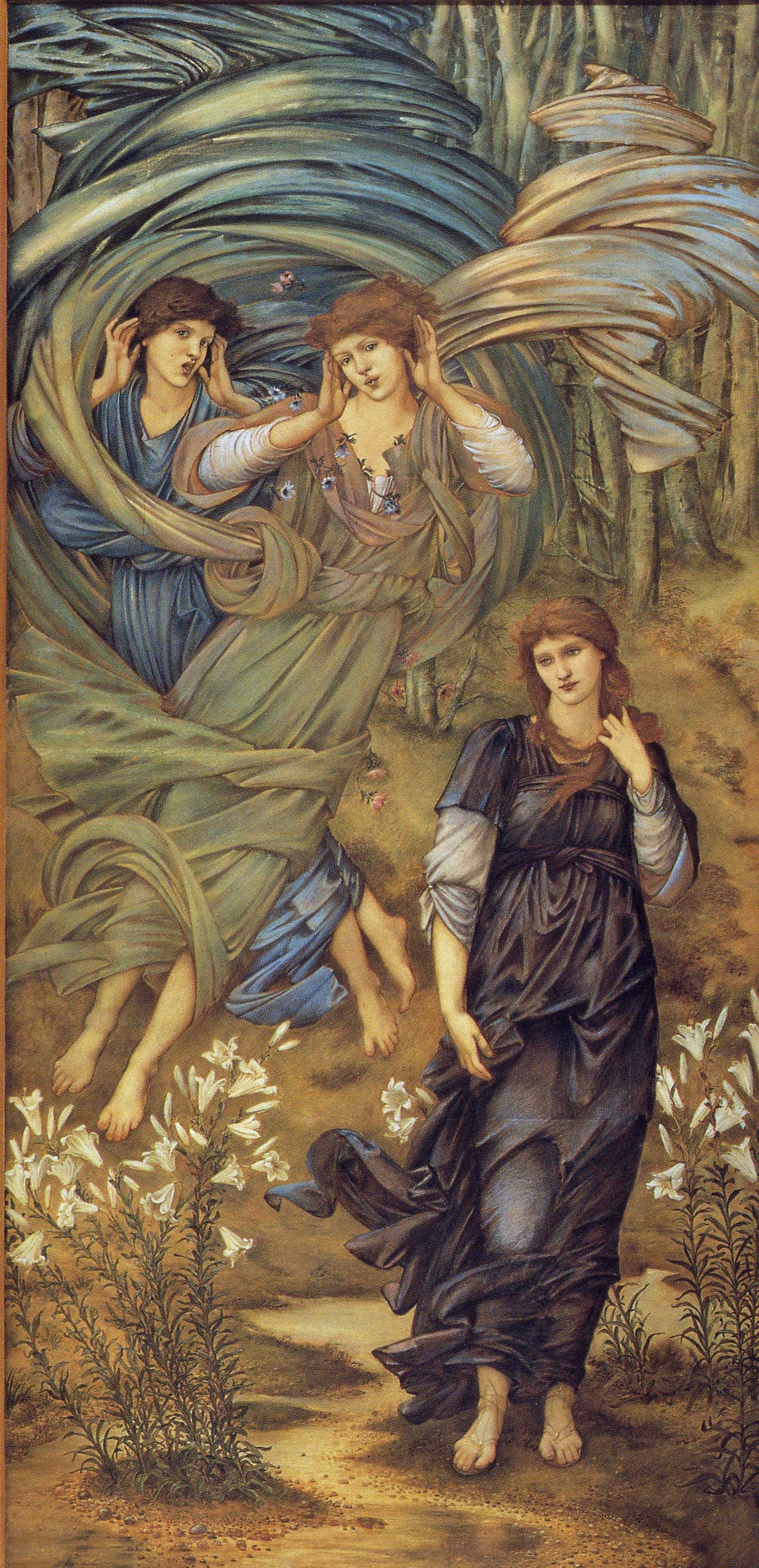
- Artist: Edward Burne-Jones
- Year: 1891
- Type: Gouache and tempera on paper
- Dimensions: 332.5 cm × 155.5 cm (130.9 in × 61.2 in)
- Location: Walker Art Gallery; Liverpool

Sponsa de Libano (The Bride of Lebanon) is a painting by the Pre-Raphaelite artist Edward Burne-Jones dated 1891.

The painting is based on extracts from the Song of Solomon in the Bible. "Come with me from Lebanon, my spouse ..." "Awake, O north wind; and come thou south; blow upon my garden ..." It may be relevant that at her appearance in Dante's Purgatorio Beatrice is accompanied by a group of female attendants singing Veni sponsa de Libano from the Song (Purgatorio, Canto XXX, line 12).

The painting shows the bride walking in the garden with female personifications of the two winds blowing towards her. On each side of the bride are white lilies, symbolising her virginity. The pose of the bride is inspired by Botticelli's figures. The painting is based on an earlier design by Burne-Jones for a tapestry.

Sponsa de Libano forms part of the Victorian collection in the Walker Art Gallery, Liverpool, Merseyside, England. It is painted in gouache and tempera on paper and measures 332.5 centimetres (131 in) by 155.5 centimetres (61 in). The picture was purchased by the gallery in 1896. In the same year the gallery purchased a study for the painting. This had been prepared in about 1891, drawn in chalk on paper, and shows the head used for one of the winds. The model was a twelve-year-old Jewish girl, who modelled for both winds, and was told to "look wild and blow with your lips". The study is now held by the Lady Lever Art Gallery in Port Sunlight, Merseyside.

== See also ==
- List of paintings by Edward Burne-Jones
