= The Garden of Pan =

Painting by Edward Burne-Jones

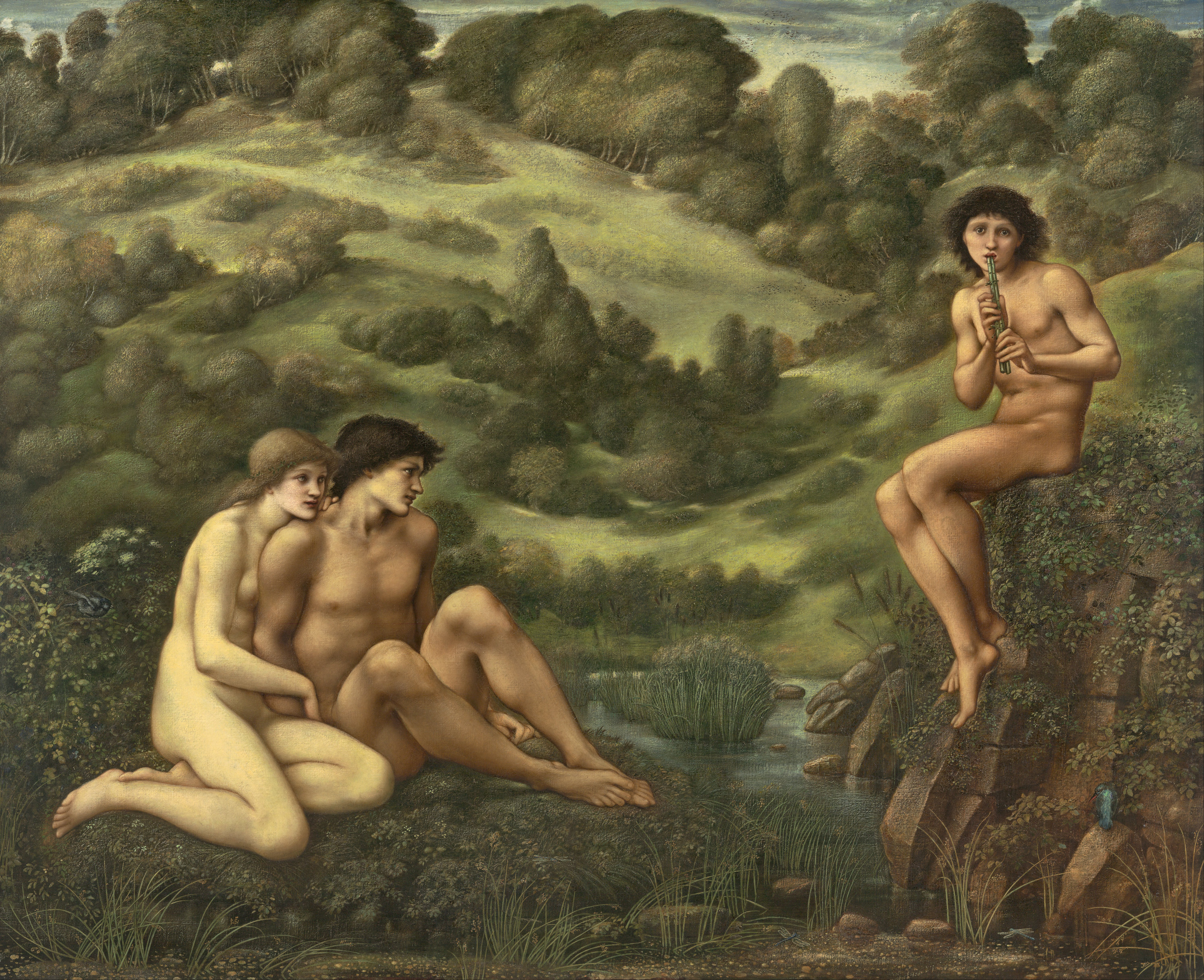
- Artist: Edward Burne-Jones
- Year: c. 1886
- Medium: oil on canvas
- Dimensions: 152.8 cm × 186.9 cm (60.2 in × 73.6 in)
- Location: National Gallery of Victoria; Melbourne

The Garden of Pan is a painting by the pre-Raphaelite artist Edward Burne-Jones which was completed around 1886 and is currently housed at the National Gallery of Victoria.

== History ==
The subject of this painting was originally to form part of a piece inspired by Burne-Jones's visit to Italy in 1872. The original had intended to depict "the beginning of the world — with Pan and Echo and sylvan gods, and a forest full of centaurs, and a wild background of woods, mountains and rivers." The artist, at some point, decided that the subject was too large and settled on the present design in a series of sketches made in the mid-1870s.

A note in Burne-Jones's work record for 1876 states that he had started work on "the large picture of Pan in the woods", but it was not until 1886 that the picture could be said to be truly begun. The final picture was exhibited in the summer of 1887 at the Grosvenor Gallery.

The painting was purchased by the National Gallery of Victoria in 1919 as part of the Felton Bequest.

== See also ==
- List of paintings by Edward Burne-Jones
- Pan
