= The Sleeping Beauty (Edward) =

Painting by Sir Edward Coley Burne-Jones

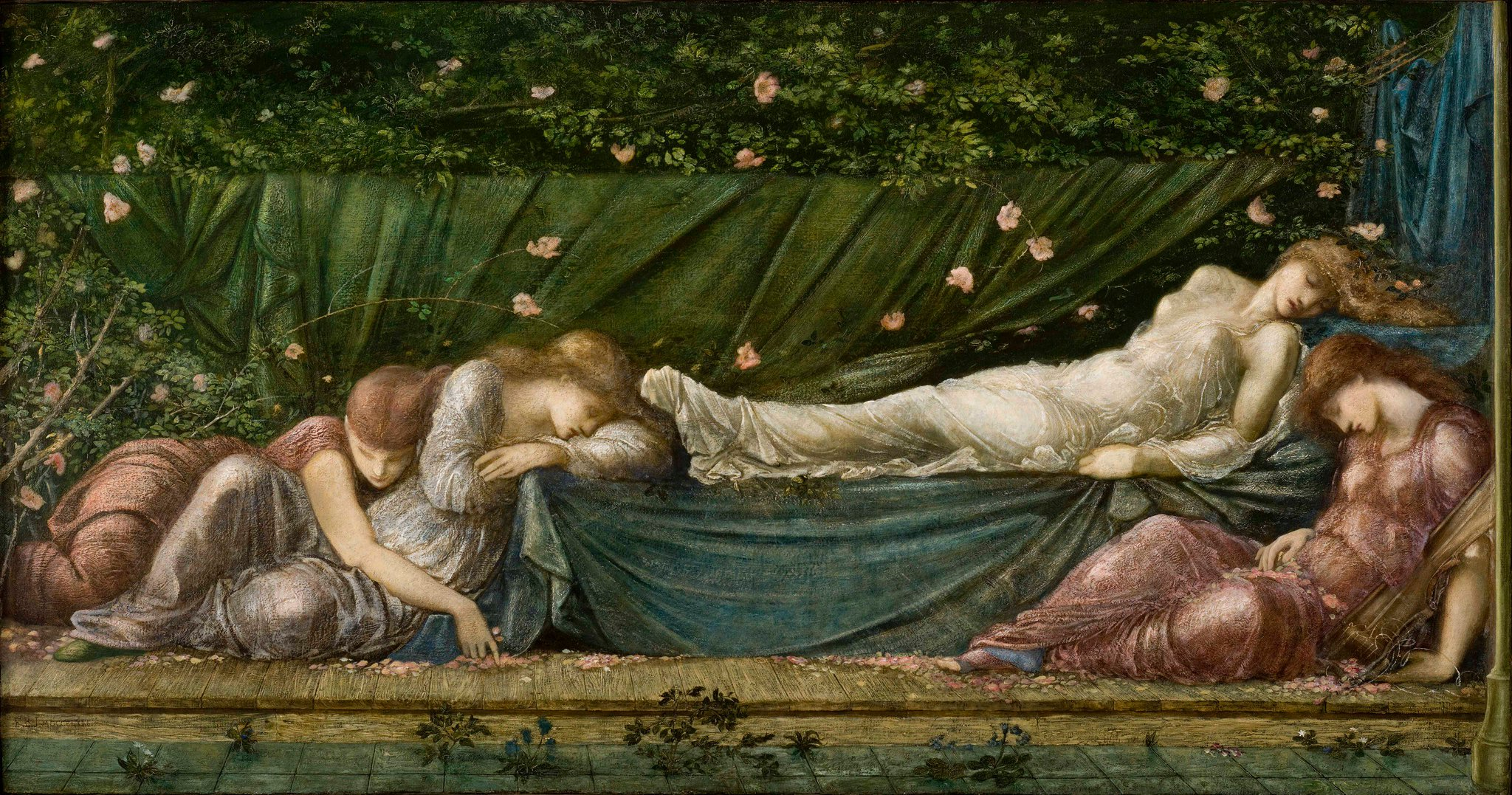
- Artist: Edward Burne-Jones
- Year: 1871–1873
- Medium: Oil on canvas
- Dimensions: 60 cm × 115 cm (24 in × 45 in)
- Location: Museo de Arte de Ponce, Puerto Rico

The Sleeping Beauty is an oil-on-canvas painting by Sir Edward Coley Burne-Jones, executed between 1871 and 1873. It is part of his Small Briar Rose series and depicts the fairy-tale moment of enchanted slumber.

== Provenance and Location ==
The painting was completed between 1871 and 1873. It entered the collection of the Museo de Arte de Ponce, Puerto Rico, in 1959, supported by the John Nicholson fund.

== See also ==
- List of paintings by Edward Burne-Jones
