= The Martyr (sculpture) =

Sculpture by Auguste Rodin

- La Martyre (French)
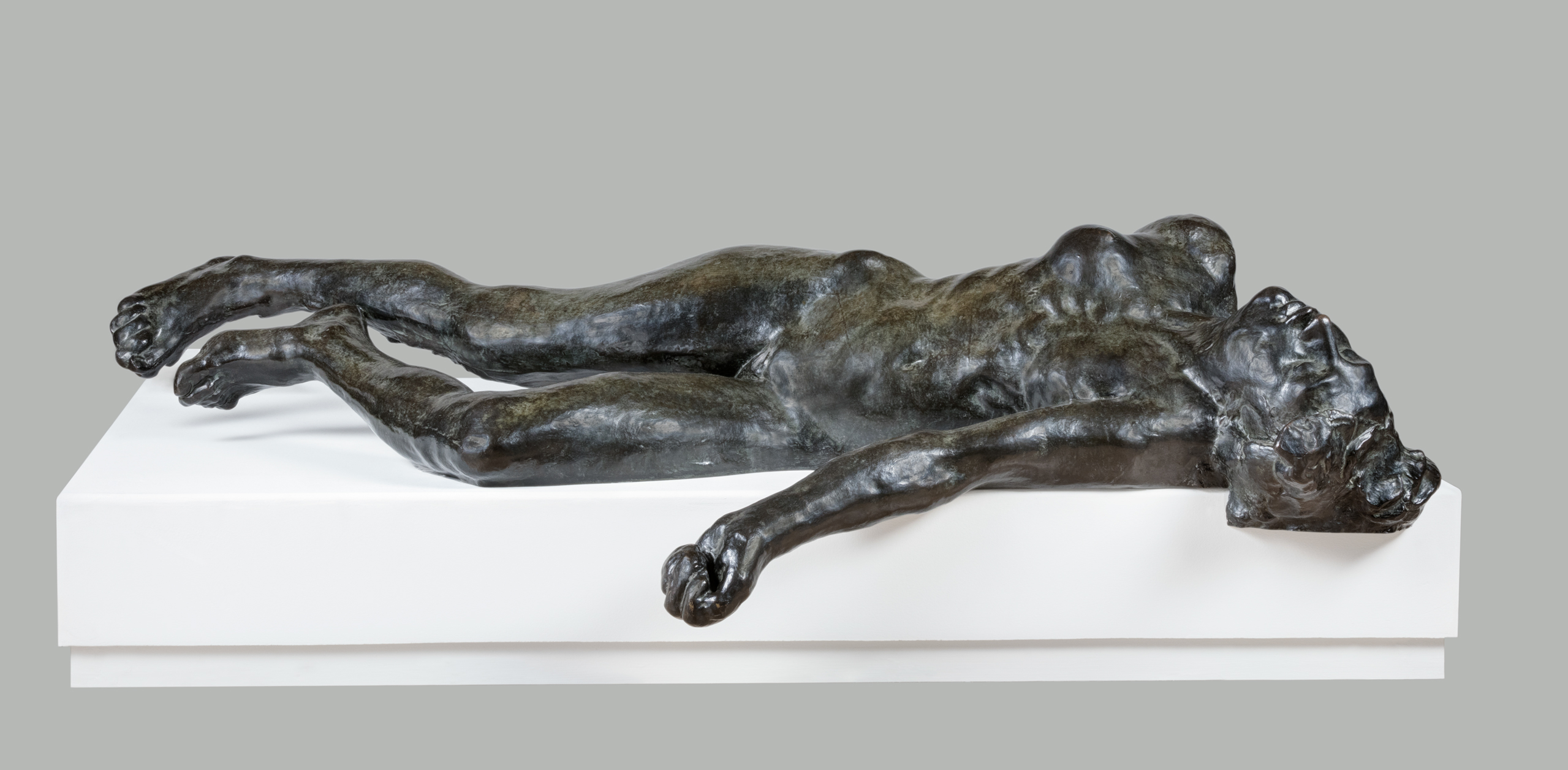
- at Museo Soumaya
- Artist: Auguste Rodin
- Year: 1885
- Type: Sculpture
- Medium: Bronze
- Dimensions: 27.6 cm × 148 cm × 98.5 cm (7.0 in × 37.6 in × 25 in)
- Location: Museo Soumaya; Mexico City

The Martyr or The Little Martyr is a c.1885 plaster sculpture of a naked dead or sleeping female figure by Auguste Rodin, now in the Musee Rodin.

== Gates of Hell ==
The sculpture is a study for a figure in the top left of Rodin's major work The Gates of Hell, though he later removed the corresponding figure from Gates. It was originally exhibited at the Exposition Universelle, representing the Bronze Age, and is now in the Musée Rodin in Paris.

== Versions ==
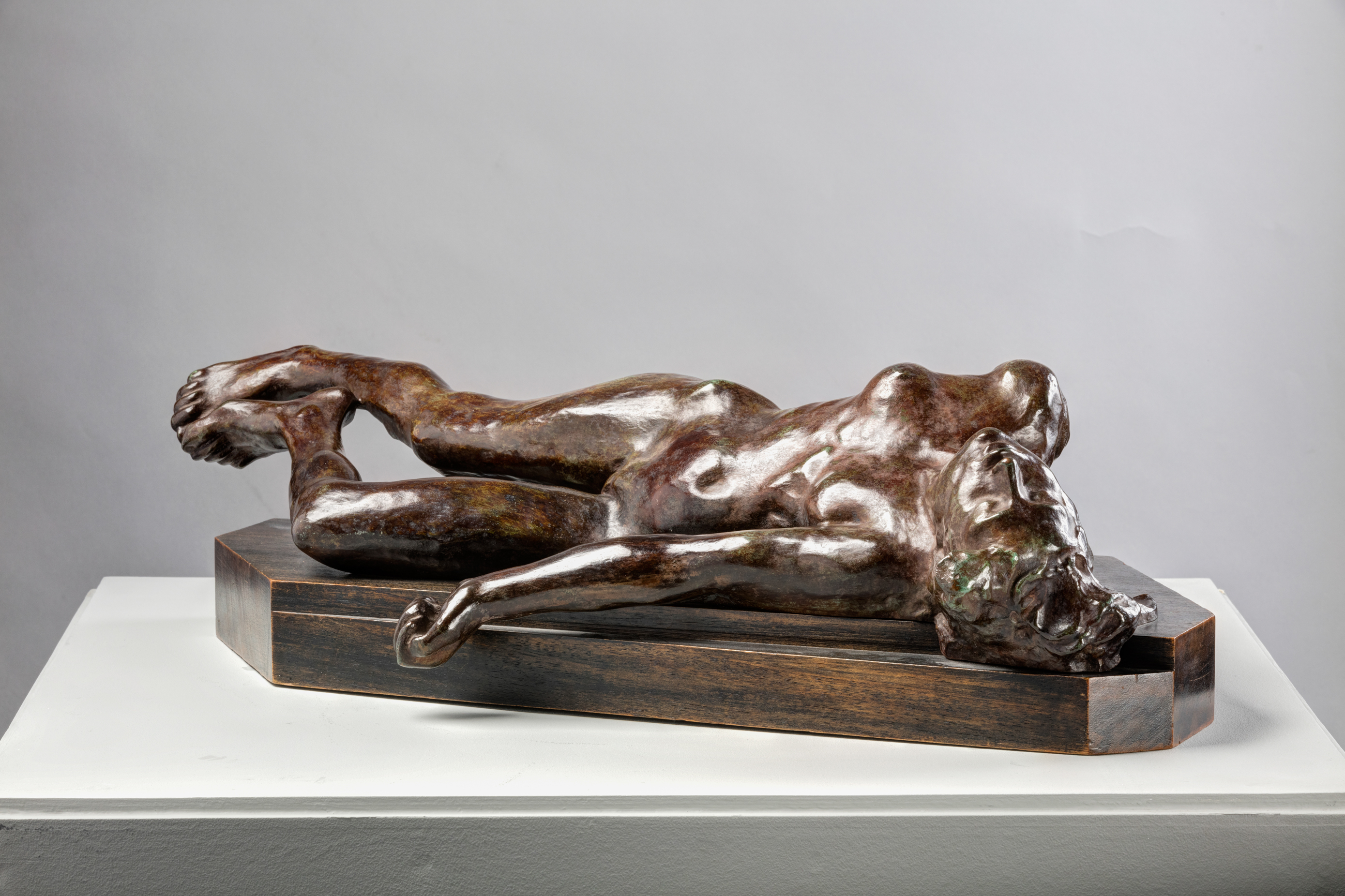
Musee Rodin casting

There is an enlarged blackened bronze cast of the work now in The Metropolitan Museum of Art. He later removed the figure's head to produce Flying Figure (c.1890) - a cast of this is now also in the Metropolitan.

== See also ==
- List of sculptures by Auguste Rodin
