= Queen Eleanor's Vengeance and Other Poems =

1857 book of poetry by William Cox Bennett

Queen Eleanor's Vengeance and Other Poems is a book of poetry written by William Cox Bennett, consisting of thirty-four poems printed on 232 pages, published in 1857.
