= Vespertina Quies =

1893 oil-on-canvas painting

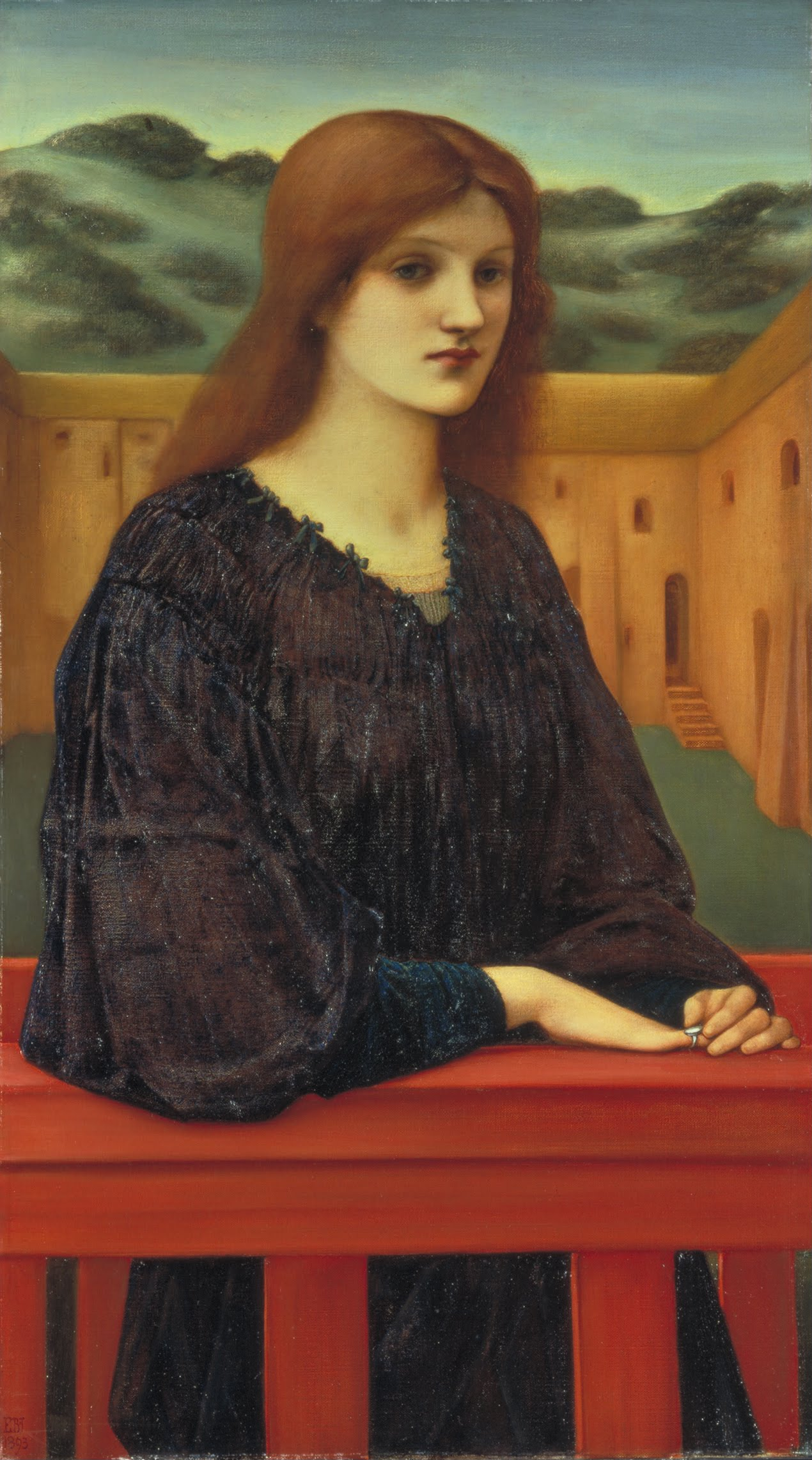
- Artist: Edward Burne-Jones
- Year: 1893
- Dimensions: 107.9 cm × 62.2 cm (42.5 in × 24.5 in)
- Location: Tate Britain, London

Vespertine Quies (Latin: "Evening Quiet") is an oil-on-canvas painting created in 1893 by Sir Edward Coley Burne-Jones. The work is part of the collection of Tate Britain, London.

== Provenance ==
The painting was previously in the Beddington family collection and was bequeathed to Tate Britain in 1940 by Miss Maud Beddington.

== See also ==
- List of paintings by Edward Burne-Jones
