= The Legend of Briar Rose =

Series of paintings by Edward Burne-Jones

View of the Saloon at Buscot Park showing two of the major panels – The Garden Court and The Rose Bower – in their context between the adjoining panels

The Legend of Briar Rose is the title of a series of paintings by the Pre-Raphaelite artist Edward Burne-Jones which were begun before 1874 but not completed until 1890. The four original paintings – The Briar Wood, The Council Chamber, The Garden Court and The Rose Bower – and an additional ten adjoining panels, are located at Buscot Park in Oxfordshire, England.

The four major panels were first exhibited at Thomas Agnew & Sons Gallery in Bond Street, London in 1890. They were acquired by Alexander Henderson, later to become the Lord Faringdon, for Buscot Park. When Burne-Jones visited the house and saw the paintings in their new setting he advised on the extension of the frames of each of the four paintings and painted ten smaller panels to fill in the gap, which continued the rose motif from the main paintings.

== Subject ==
The paintings depict a moment in the story of "Sleeping Beauty", the title of the series coming from the version presented by the Brothers Grimm in their collection of 1812.

== Major panels ==
Each major panel measures 49 by 98¼ inches but the ten joining panels vary in width. The paintings do not tell a sequential story but record the same moment in each location. Running beneath each of the major panels is an inscription of a poem by William Morris.

=== The Briar Wood ===
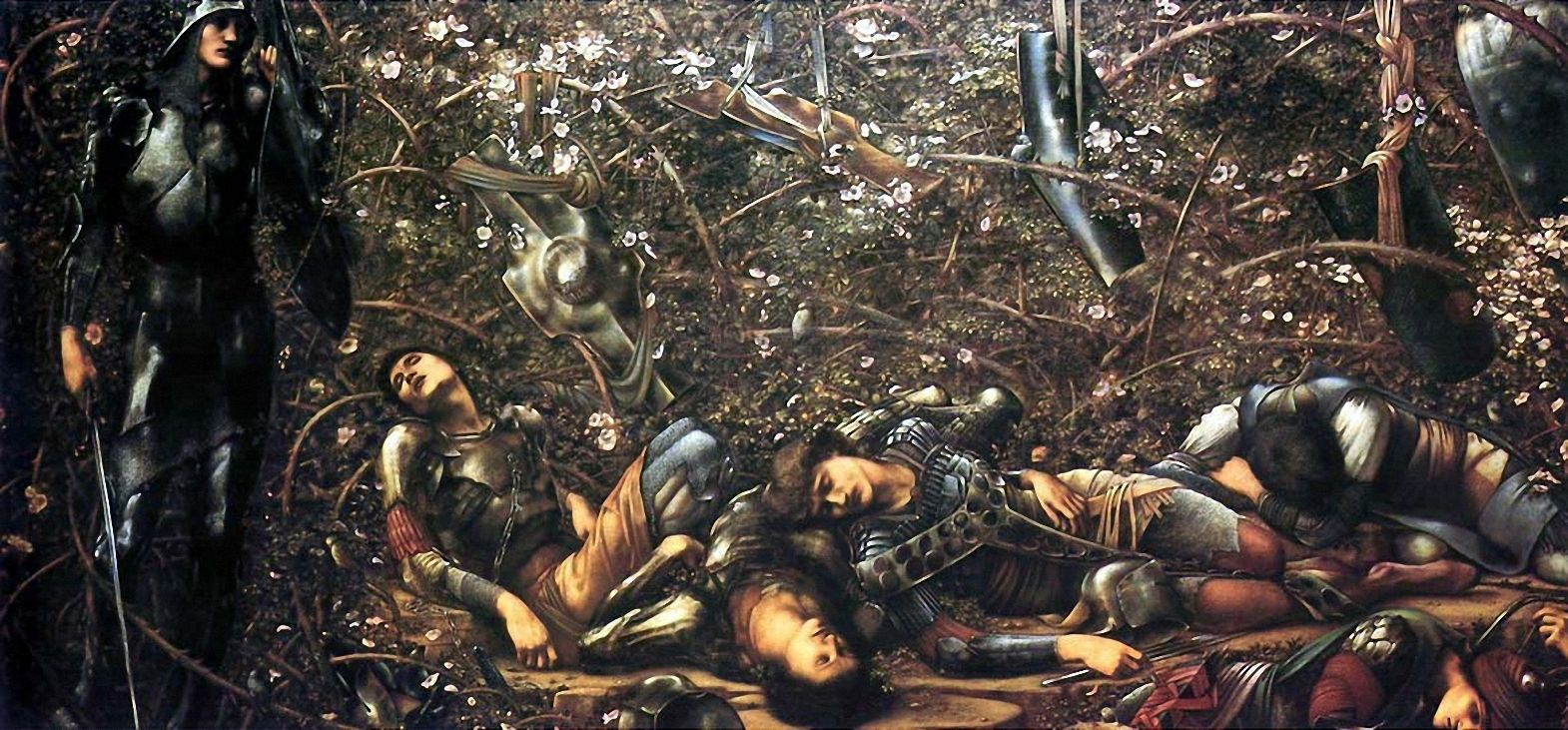
The Briar Wood

The painting depicts the discovery of the sleeping soldiers by a Knight. In their slumber they have become completed entwined by the barbed thorns of the Briar rose.

Under The Briar Wood the inscription reads:

"The fateful slumber floats and flows
About the tangle of the rose;
But lo! the fated hand and heart
To rend the slumberous curse apart!"

=== The Council Chamber ===
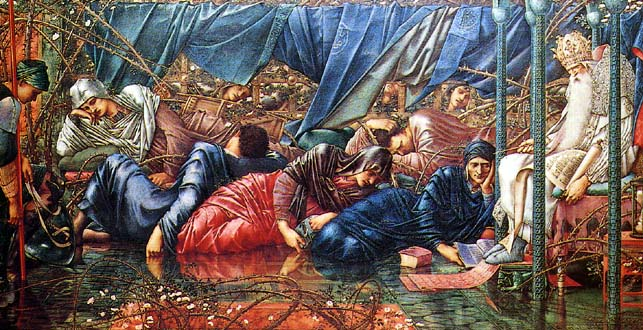
The Council Chamber

The painting shows the scene in the Council chamber. The members of the council sleep, as does the King who is slumped on his throne. Under the draped curtains and through the window further soldiers can be seen sleeping.

Under The Council Chamber, the inscription reads:

"The threat of war, the hope of peace,
The Kingdoms peril and increase
Sleep on, and bide the latter day
When Fate shall take her chain away."

=== The Garden Court ===
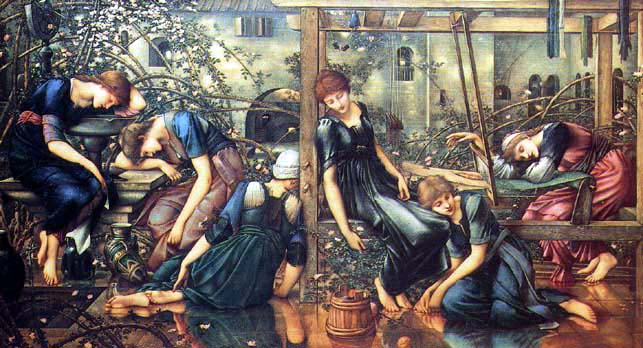
The Garden Court

The painting shows the weavers having fallen asleep at their loom. The walls of the castle form the backdrop to the painting as do arches of roses.

Under The Garden Court, the inscription reads:

"The maiden pleasance of the land
Knoweth no stir of voice or hand,
No cup the sleeping waters fill,
The restless shuttle lieth still."

=== The Rose Bower ===
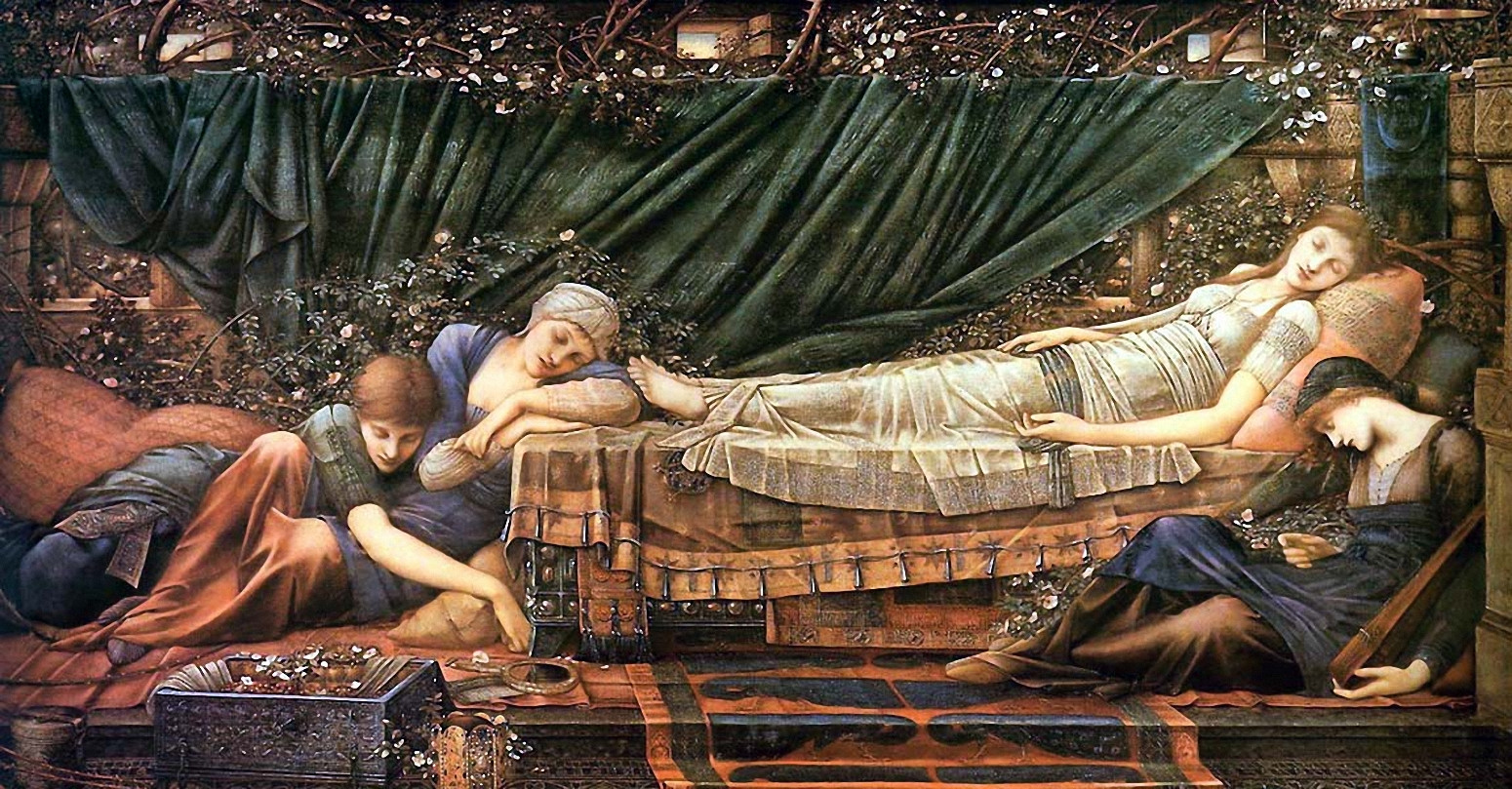
The Rose Bower

The sleeping beauty lies on her bed surrounded by her slumbering attendants. The rose is seen encircling the drapery in the background

Under The Rose Bower, the inscription reads:

Here lies the hoarded love, the key
To all the treasure that shall be;
Come fated hand the gift to take
And smite this sleeping world awake."

== Related works ==
Burne-Jones created two other series of paintings on the same subject.

- The Small Briar Rose series was completed before the Buscot Park series. All three paintings – The Briar Wood, The Council Chamber, The Rose Bower – are now in the Museo de Arte de Ponce, Puerto Rico.
- The Third Briar Rose series was completed after the Buscot Park series. The three paintings have been split between three collections. The Garden Court is in Bristol City Museum and Art Gallery, The Council Chamber is in the Delaware Art Museum, Wilmington and The Rose Bower is in the Hugh Lane Gallery of Modern Art, Dublin.

== See also ==
- List of paintings by Edward Burne-Jones
