= Georgiana Burne-Jones =

British painter and engraver (1840-1920)

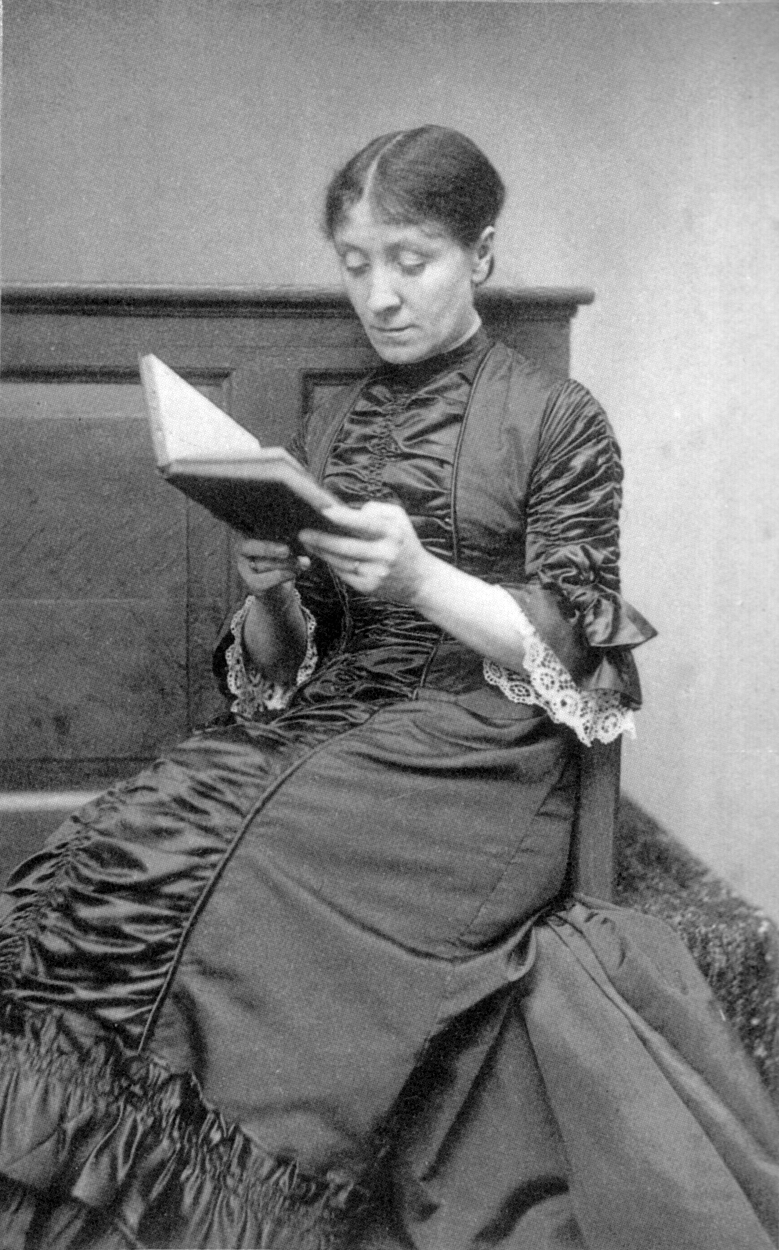
- Georgiana Burne-Jones, née MacDonald c. 1882, photographed by Frederick Hollyer
- Born: Georgiana MacDonald; 21 July 1840; Birmingham, England, United Kingdom of Great Britain and Ireland
- Died: 2 February 1920 (aged 79)
- Movement: Pre-Raphaelite Brotherhood, Aesthetic Movement, Arts and Crafts Movement
- Spouse: Edward Burne-Jones (m. 1860; died 1898)

Georgiana, Lady Burne-Jones (née MacDonald; 21 July 1840 – 2 February 1920) was a British painter and engraver, and the second oldest of the MacDonald sisters. She was married to the Late Pre-Raphaelite artist Edward Burne-Jones, and was also the mother of painter Philip Burne-Jones, aunt of novelist Rudyard Kipling and Prime Minister Stanley Baldwin, confidante and friend of George Eliot, William Morris, and John Ruskin. She was a Trustee of the South London Gallery and was elected to the parish Council of Rottingdean, near Brighton in Sussex.

She is known for the biography of her husband, The Memorials of Edward Burne-Jones and for publishing his Flower Book. She became the mother-in-law of John William Mackail, who married her daughter Margaret. Their children were the novelists Angela Thirkell, Denis Mackail and Clare Mackail.

== Early life ==
Georgiana, always called "Georgie", was born in Birmingham on 21 July 1840, one of eight surviving children born to the Reverend George Browne Macdonald (1805–1868), a Methodist minister, and his second wife Hannah Macdonald, née Jones (1809–1875).

The Macdonald family moved frequently since the usual time in each of George's postings was three years, returning to Birmingham in September 1850, where Georgiana's elder brother Harry attended King Edward's School. Through him Georgiana and her sisters were introduced to a group of students who would become known as the Birmingham Set or "Pembroke Set" at the University of Oxford, most of whom were from Birmingham or had studied at King Edward's. Among them was the young Edward Burne-Jones (then plain Edward or Ned Jones). Edward went up to Exeter College, Oxford, to study theology. There he met William Morris as a consequence of a mutual interest in poetry. The two Exeter undergraduates formed a very close and intimate society, which they called "The Brotherhood", with other members of the Birmingham set. The members of the Brotherhood read John Ruskin and Tennyson, visited churches, and worshipped the Middle Ages. At that time neither Burne-Jones nor Morris knew Dante Gabriel Rossetti personally, but both were much influenced by his works, and met him by recruiting him as a contributor to their Oxford and Cambridge Magazine which Morris founded in 1856 to promote their ideas. Under Rossetti's influence both Burne-Jones and Morris decided to become artists, and Burne-Jones left college before taking a degree to pursue a career in art.

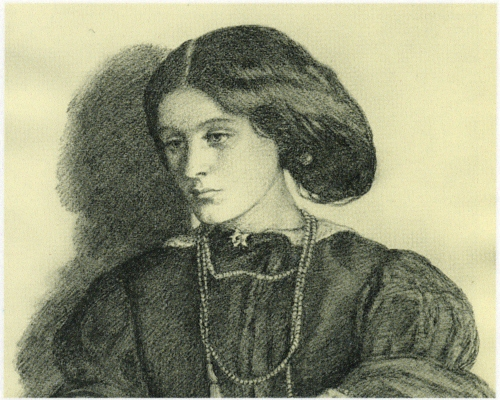
Georgiana Burne-Jones by Dante Gabriel Rossetti, about the time of her marriage in 1860

Georgiana moved to London with her family in 1853, following the death of her sister Carrie from tuberculosis; first to Sloane Square, and then to 33 Walpole Street. The family then moved to 17 Beaumont Street in Marylebone, in August 1856. After a brief family relocation to Manchester, Georgiana moved on her marriage into Russell Street in 1860.

Through her friendship with, and eventual engagement to Edward, at age 15 in June 1856, she was able to visit the studio where he worked with Rossetti and Morris. She was also introduced to John Ruskin. She said, "I wish it were possible to explain the impression made upon me as a young girl whose experience so far had been quite remote from art, by sudden and close intercourse with those to whom it was the breath of life ... I felt in the presence of a new religion."

The artist Ford Madox Brown and his wife Emma invited Georgiana to an extended stay at their London home in April, 1860, so that she could spend time with Edward, and the two were married two months later.

== Marriage and family ==
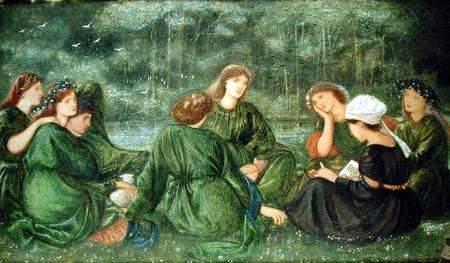
Green Summer, watercolour by Edward Burne-Jones, 1864. Louisa and Agnes Macdonald, Jane Morris, and others listening to Georgiana reading aloud in the garden at Red House.

Georgiana and Edward married in Manchester on 9 June 1860. Georgiana was 19, and Edward 27. They had been engaged for four years to the day. Between them they had £30 and a deal table containing her engraving tools, but "Light-hearted indifference, however, to many things generally regarded as essential lent boldness to domestic arrangements, and I remember thinking it quite natural that in the middle of the morning I should ask our only maid – a pretty one – to stand for me that I may try to draw her; to which she, being good tempered as well as pretty, cheerfully consented."

Georgiana moved on her marriage into rented rooms in Great Russell Street. The early years of their marriage were idyllic; they spent a summer with William and Jane Morris at Red House, working together on decorating projects. Their first child, Philip Burne-Jones, was born on 21 October 1861. But in the summer of 1864 little Phil caught scarlet fever, and Georgiana soon contracted the dread disease, which brought on the premature birth of her second child, Christopher, who was also infected and died soon after. Georgiana was ill for months, and on her recovery refused to return to their old rooms where so much tragedy had occurred. The family soon moved to 41 Kensington Square, and their daughter Margaret was born there in the summer of 1866.

After Georgiana's marriage, her sisters Louisa, Alice and Agnes, married Alfred Baldwin, John Lockwood Kipling and Edward Poynter respectively. Their youngest sister, Edith, cared for their parents in the family home and published a brief family history.

== Artistic career ==
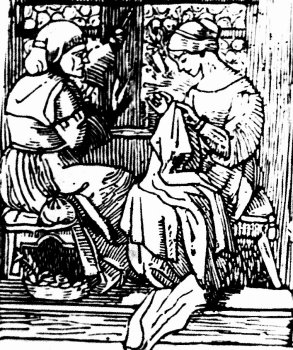
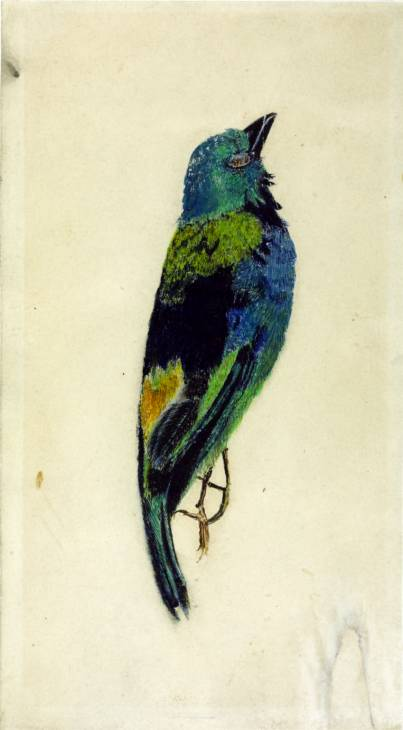
Surviving works by Georgiana Burne-Jones. Left: Undated woodcut.
Right image: Dead Bird, watercolour, 1857.

Georgiana attended the Government School of Design, which was part of the South Kensington museums complex in a building that is now part of the Victoria and Albert Museum. Georgiana dismissed her time at the school in a single sentence in Memorials by saying she had not learned anything of importance.

In 1856, Georgiana took lessons from Ford Madox Brown and remembered, "Madox Brown's incredible kindness in allowing me and Miss Seddon, sister to his dead friend Thomas Seddon the artist, to come and try to paint from a model in his studio".

There are few surviving examples of her artwork. One of her woodcuts and a small, exquisitely coloured watercolour and pencil rendering of a dead bird show a focus on small scale personal drawings and woodcuts to be used as book illustrations. The bird was done in 1857 and is held by the Tate Britain.

In 1861, the decorative arts firm Morris, Marshall, Faulkner & Co., "Fine Art Workmen in Painting, Carving, Furniture and the Metals," was jointly created by William Morris, Madox Brown, Burne-Jones, Charles Faulkner, Rossetti, P. P. Marshall, and Philip Webb to create and sell medieval-inspired, handcrafted items for the home. Jane Morris directed the embroidery arm, and Georgiana was employed painting tiles, but with the birth of her son Philip in October of that year she gave up the art studio to become a full-time caregiver. "I remember the feeling of exile with which I now heard through its closed door the well-known voices of friends together with Edward's familiar laugh, while I sat with my little son on my knee and dropped selfish tears on him as 'separator of companions and the terminator of delights'". As late as 1868 she was still attempting to learn to etch but none of her work was published.

== Friendships ==
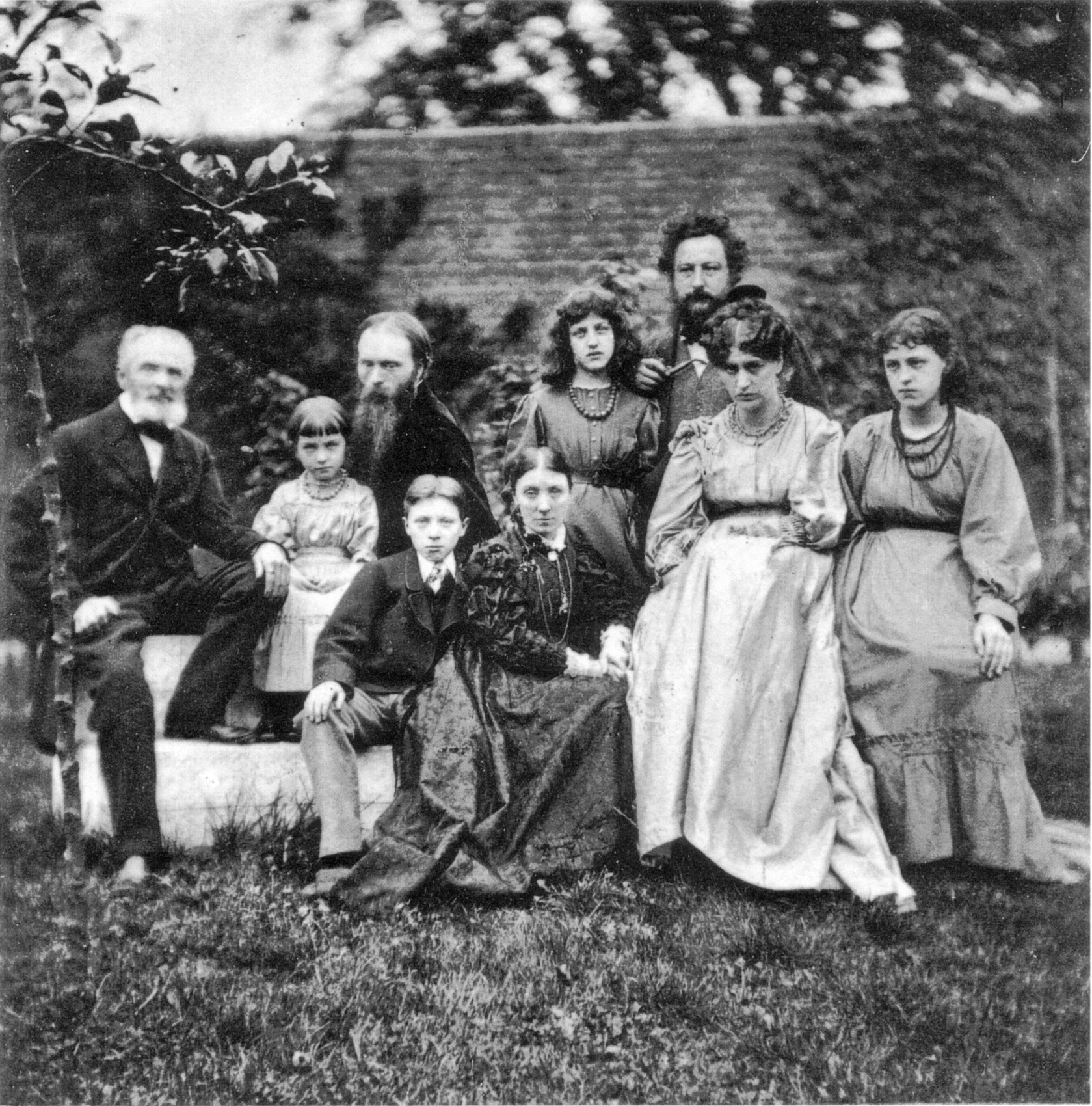
The Morris and Burne-Jones families, 1874.

In 1867 the Burne-Jones family moved again, to the Grange, an 18th-century house set in a large garden in North End Road, Fulham, London. For much of the 1870s Burne-Jones did not exhibit, following a spate of bitterly hostile attacks in the press, and a passionate affair (described as the "emotional climax of his life") with his Greek model Maria Zambaco which became a public scandal bordering on farce when she tried to commit suicide by throwing herself in Regent's Canal in 1869. During these difficult years Georgiana developed a close friendship with William Morris, whose wife Jane had fallen in love with Rossetti. Morris and Georgiana may have been in love, but if he asked her to leave her husband (as some of his poetry of these years suggests), she refused.

Of the Zambaco affair, which would sputter on for some years, Georgiana wrote to her dear friend Rosalind Howard "Dearest Rosalind, be hard on no one in this matter, and exalt no one, and may we all come through it at last. I know one thing, and that is that there is enough love between Edward and me to last out a long life if it is given us".

In the end, the Burne-Joneses remained together for another 30 years, as did the Morrises. William Morris and Georgiana remained close until his death.

Another close friend was George Eliot, whom Georgiana met in February 1868. The self-educated novelist encouraged her young friend to make up for her lack of education, and Georgiana studied to improve her scant French and German, and took Latin lessons. They remained close until Eliot's sudden marriage in 1880, of which Georgiana had no inkling in advance, left her feeling betrayed and untrusted. The rift was never mended, for Eliot died that December.

== Public life ==
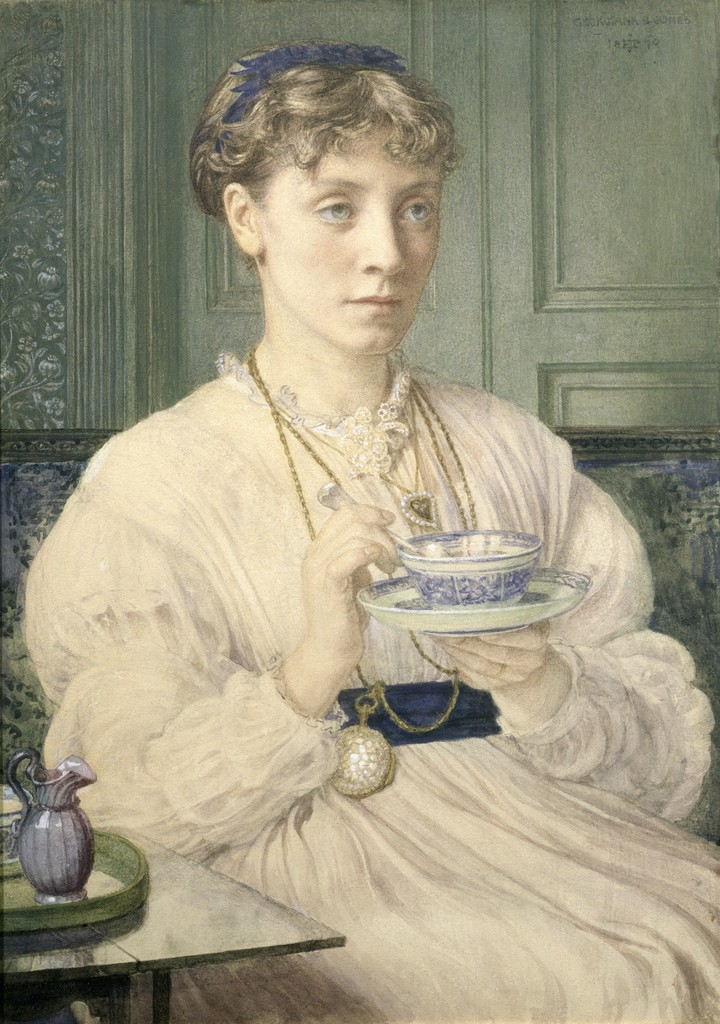
Georgiana Burne-Jones by Edward Poynter, c. 1870

In 1880 the Burne-Joneses bought Prospect House in Rottingdean, near Brighton in Sussex, as their holiday home, and in 1889 they acquired Aubrey Cottage next door to create North End House, reflecting the fact that their Fulham home was in North End Road. Georgiana loved her new country house and garden, and became active in village affairs. Rottingdean became her home in way that it never was for her husband, who preferred the Grange and its studio.

Although she had abandoned organized religion at the time of her marriage, Georgiana's Methodist upbringing emphasized service to the community, and she had been a supporter of William Morris's active role in the Social Democratic Federation and later the Socialist League. Her close friends Morris, John Ruskin, and Rosalind Howard were all involved in progressive causes. Georgiana's first steps into public service came as a supporter of the South London Fine Art Gallery, which had been established in 1891 to arts education for the working classes of South London. Georgiana encouraged the loan of her husband's paintings and those of others in her circle. She and Walter Crane championed the addition of a library to the gallery. She became the only woman on the committee established to turn governance of the gallery over to the local authority, and discovered a talent for detail-oriented committee work.

In the mid-1880s Burne-Jones had begun hyphenating his name, merely - as he wrote later - to avoid "annihilation" in the mass of Joneses, and thus Georgiana became Lady Burne-Jones when her husband reluctantly accepted a baronetcy in 1894, partially at least as the title would descend to his son Philip, who ran with the smart set around the Prince of Wales and cared very much for the honour. Jane Morris wrote that her husband had commented "Well, a man can be an ass for the sake of his children", but in general the Socialists of their circle and Georgiana herself were appalled.

In 1895, the new Lady Burne-Jones took her first steps into elected office, winning a seat on the parish council of her beloved Rottingdean (an office established by the Local Government Act 1894), to the apparent delight of both her husband and her old friend William Morris. She supported interests of the working class and women's issues, taking positions in her electioneering materials that were radical for the wife of a baronet and simply baffling to the villagers of Rottingden. But her day-to-day work in the parish focused on street lighting, fire brigades, and the provision of a village nurse for the community.

== Widowhood and memorials ==
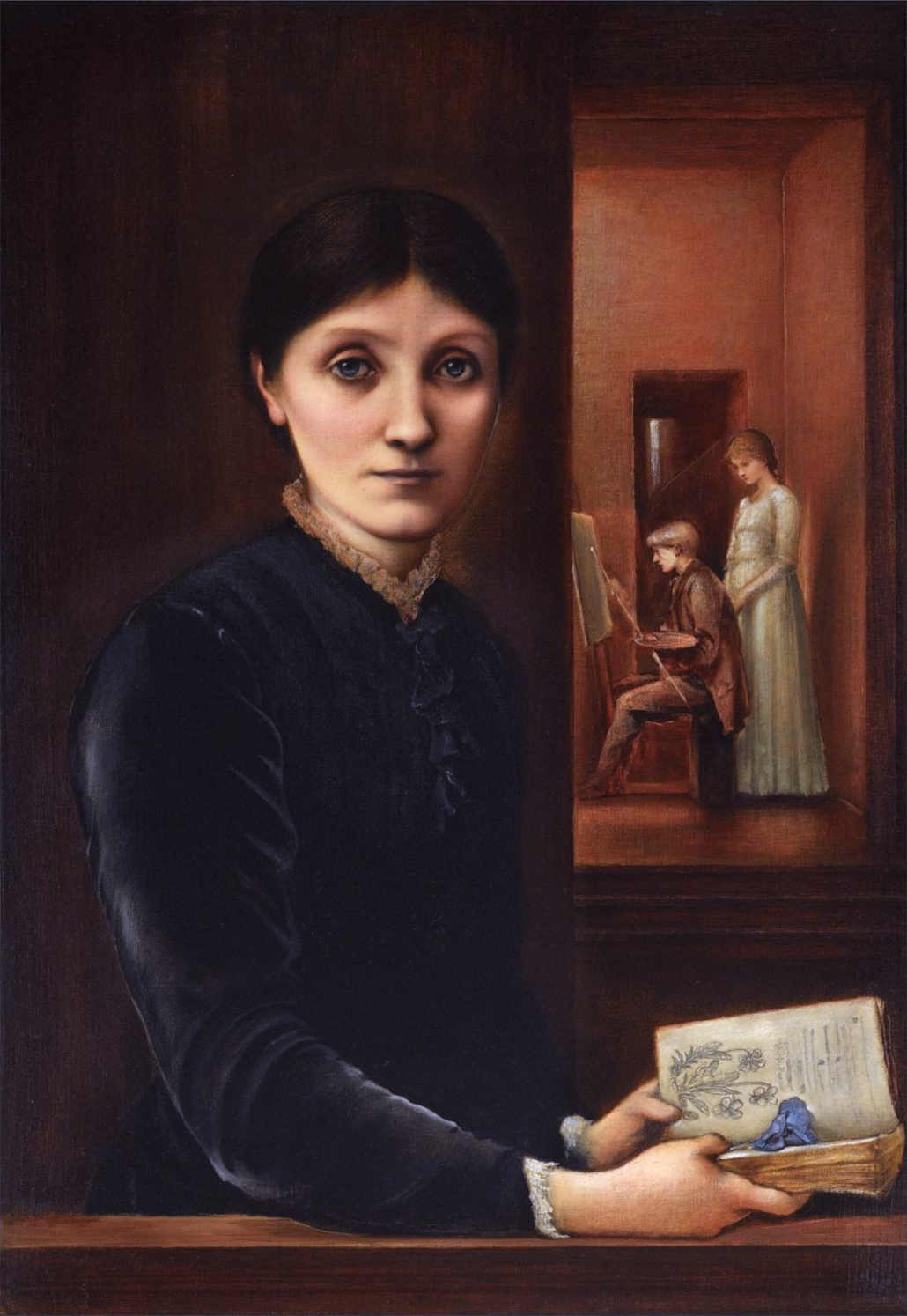
Georgiana Burne-Jones and her children by Edward Burne-Jones, begun 1883

William Morris died after a lingering illness in October 1896. Edward Burne-Jones, who had been Morris's friend and partner since their college days, was devastated, and his health declined substantially. In 1898 he had an attack of influenza, and had apparently recovered, when he was again taken suddenly ill, and died of a heart attack in the early hours of 17 June 1898. Six days later, at the intervention of the Prince of Wales, a memorial service was held at Westminster Abbey. It was the first time an artist had been so honoured. Burne-Jones was cremated and his ashes were buried in a grave lined with moss and roses at the village church in Rottingdean.

Edward Burne-Jones had dreaded that someone unsympathetic would attempt his biography, and had asked his wife to take up the task. Georgiana, now aged 58, began work within months of Edward's death, reveling in memory. In a letter to F. G. Stephens, she wrote, "There are so few left now who can recall those early days when Gabriel [Rossetti] was in his glory and Edward and Morris sat at his feet and rejoiced in his light".

Memorials of Edward Burne-Jones was published six years later, in 1904, in two volumes, and remains a standard reference. In keeping with the standards of the times, much of the vagaries of his personal life were glossed over (the years of the episode with Maria Zambaco fall neatly into a period somewhere between the end of Volume 1 and the beginning of Volume 2).

While she worked on the Memorials, Georgiana remained active on the Rottingdean parish council, and her politics became if anything more radical as she grew older. At the outbreak of the Boer War, England was swept up in a wave of pro-war patriotism, but Georgiana opposed Britain's action in South Africa. When news of the relief of the siege of Mafeking arrived, Georgiana hung a banner at North End House reading "We have killed and also take possession," paraphrasing a verse from the Bible. Her nephew, Rudyard Kipling, rushed to her house to ensure she would not fall victim to an outraged mob of villagers.

In 1905, Georgiana arranged the publication of The Flower Book, a limited-edition facsimile of an album of watercolour flower paintings by Edward Burne-Jones. Three hundred copies were issued in cooperation with the Fine Art Society of London. It was printed by Henri Piazza, who hand-stencilled watercolour over collotypes using the pochoir technique to produce brilliant colours. These copies of the Flower Book were sold in both bound and unbound form, with the unbound copies contained in a clamshell box.

Georgiana Burne-Jones died on 2 February 1920 after a short illness. Her son Philip, who had become a portrait painter, died in 1926. Her daughter Margaret married John William Mackail (1850–1945), the friend and biographer of Morris, and Professor of Poetry at Oxford from 1911 to 1916, and died in 1953. Their children were the novelists Angela Thirkell and Denis Mackail.

== In portraits ==
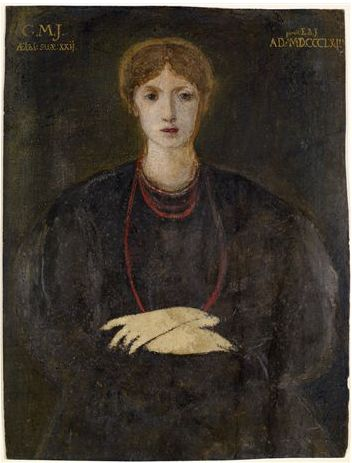
Georgiana Burne-Jones by Edward Burne-Jones, 1863.

Georgiana Burne-Jones, in common with others of her circle, is portrayed in a number of drawings and paintings by her husband and other artists. A portrait by her husband, dated 1863 and now in the Birmingham Museum and Art Gallery portrays the 22-year-old Georgiana in a format heavily influenced by Renaissance portraiture, including the Latin inscription. It is one of Burne-Jones's first attempts at formal portraiture.

Green Summer, a watercolour by Burne-Jones painted at Red House in the summer of 1864 while Georgiana's sisters Louisa and Agnes were visiting London, depicts Louisa, Agnes, Jane Morris, and others listening to Georgiana reading aloud. A version in oils was painted in 1868.

A portrait of Georgiana drinking tea of c. 1870 was painted by her brother-in-law, the artist Edward Poynter.

Burne-Jones's best-known portrait of his wife was begun in 1883, and shows her holding an herbal, with her children in the background, Philip (aged about 22) at his easel and Margaret (about 17) standing behind him. Burne-Jones tinkered with the portrait for years, and it remained unfinished at his death. It was never exhibited in his lifetime.
