= MacDonald sisters =

Four English sisters who married well

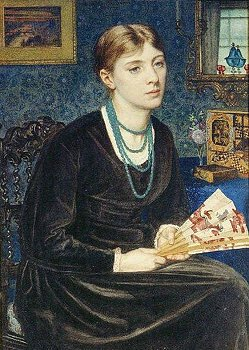
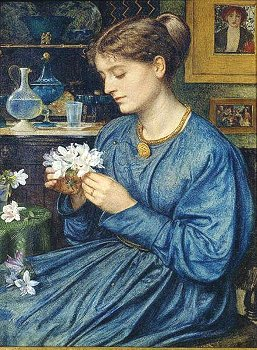
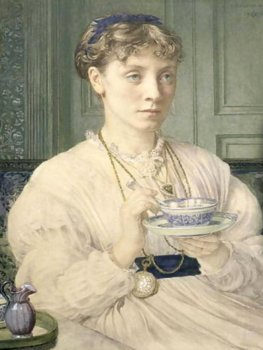
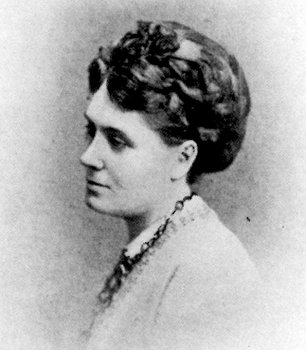
Images of the four MacDonald sisters: Louisa Baldwin (top left), Agnes Poynter (top right), Georgiana Burne-Jones (bottom left), all in paintings by Edward Poynter, and Alice Kipling (bottom right), in a photograph possibly by Poynter.

The MacDonald sisters were four English women of part-Scottish descent born during the 19th century, notable for their marriages to well-known men. Alice, Georgiana, Agnes and Louisa were the daughters of Reverend George Browne Macdonald (1805–1868), a Wesleyan Methodist minister, and Hannah Jones (1809–1875).

== Biographies ==
There were 11 children in the MacDonald family, seven daughters and four sons:

- Mary (1834–1836), the firstborn
- Henry (1836–1891), nicknamed Harry, who introduced his younger sisters Georgiana and Agnes to his artistic friends, including Edward Burne-Jones, known as the Birmingham Set (a group of artists which included William Morris)
- Alice (1837–1910)
- Caroline (1838–1854);
- Georgiana (1840–1920)
- Frederic William (1842–1928)
- Agnes (1843–1906)
- Louisa (1845–1925)
- Walter (1847–1847)
- Edith (1848–1937), who never married and lived at home until her mother's death
- Herbert (1850–1851)

=== Alice ===
Alice was born on 4 April 1837 in Sheffield. She married John Lockwood Kipling whom she had met at Rudyard Lake in Staffordshire. They married in March 1865, after he was made Architectural Sculptor and Professor of Modelling at the School of Art and Industry in Bombay (now known as Sir Jamsetjee Jeejebhoy School of Art) during the preceding January, Alice became the mother of Rudyard Kipling on 30 December 1865 who was born on the school campus. Lord Dufferin once said of her, "Dullness and Mrs Kipling cannot exist in the same room."

=== Georgiana ===
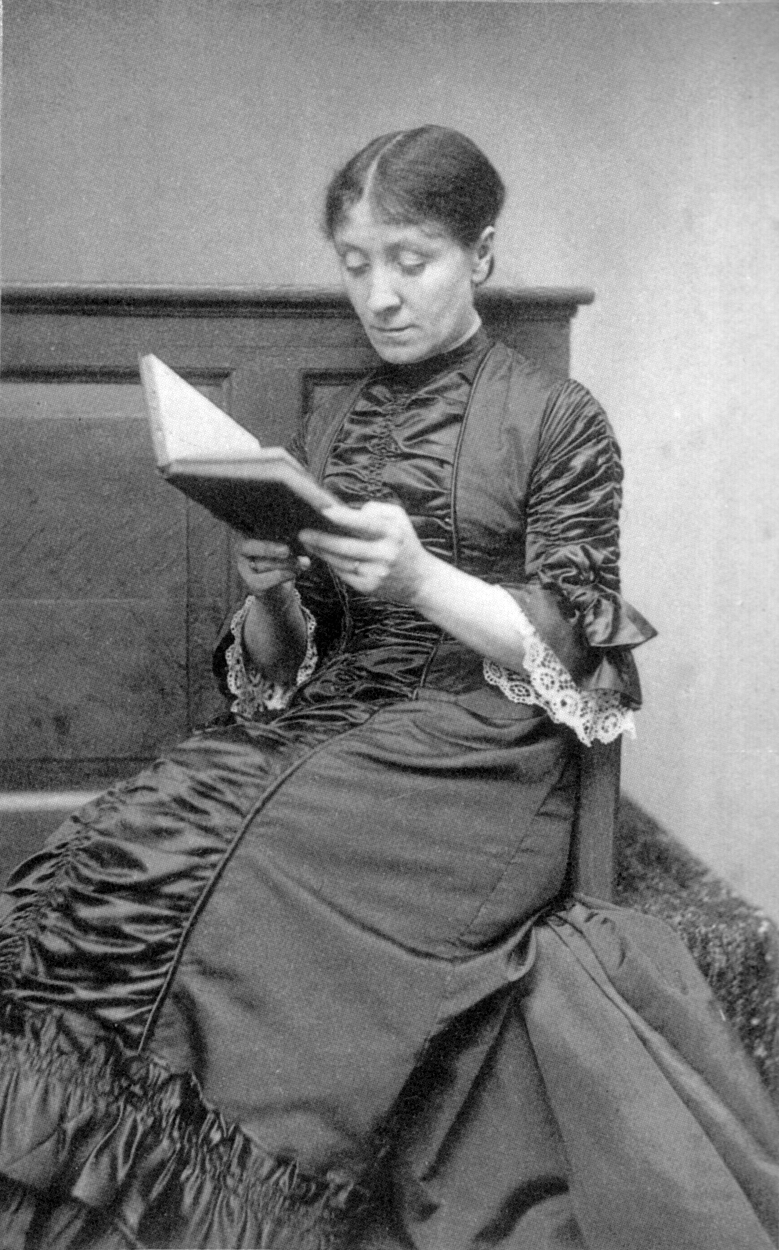
Georgiana Burne-Jones, née Macdonald c.1882, photographed by Frederick Hollyer

George Macdonald was relocated by the Methodist Conference to a Birmingham circuit following the birth of Alice, and it was here that Georgie was born on 28 July 1840. Georgiana and her sister Agnes received attention from prospective suitors including members of the Birmingham Set, a loose group of visual artists and writers of which her brother was a member. She married the Pre-Raphaelite painter Edward Burne-Jones, a member of the Set, during 1859. They had three children, Philip, Christopher and Margaret - although Christopher died in infancy. She became in time the mother-in-law of John William Mackail and grandmother of Denis Mackail and Angela Thirkell (born Angela Mackail).

=== Agnes ===
Agnes was a talented pianist and thought to be the best-looking of the sisters. She and her sister Georgiana received attention from prospective suitors who were friends of her brother and members of the Birmingham Set. She eventually married the future president of the Royal Academy Edward Poynter during 1866 in a double wedding with her quieter sister Louisa. Poynter appeared to be a manic depressive and he would paint continuously until finally collapsing when a work was finished. He was unemotional and it was Agnes who supplied the affection in their household. Her husband later produced paintings of two of her sisters. She, Jane Morris and her sisters Louisa and Georgiana are thought to be the inspiration for figures of Burne-Jones' 1864 painting Green Summer. Agnes, Lady Poynter, is thought to have died during 1906 from cancer despite an operation in 1903.

=== Louisa ===
Louisa was a writer who married the industrialist Alfred Baldwin in 1866 in a double wedding with her sister Agnes, who married Sir Edward John Poynter. Alfred and Louisa were the parents of Stanley Baldwin who was UK prime minister on three occasions. After his birth, Louisa seemed unhappy with her life in Worcestershire where her husband was an ironmaster. She had at least one miscarriage and spent time in a bath chair, and days alone in darkness.

Later commentators have noted that she would recover when on holiday, and have proposed that her illness was a form of hypochondria. During the 1870s the couple travelled to find a cure, and she tried a wide variety of medicines. She recovered in 1883 and took a leading role in her local village of Wilden, near Stourport.

In 1886, she published "A Martyr to Mammon", and, in 1889, "The Story of a Marriage". Her recovery did not outlast her husband's election to Parliament in 1902, and her condition was made worse by his death in 1908. She commissioned stained glass windows for Wilden church from Edward Burne-Jones.

Louisa was, in time, the grandmother to Oliver and Arthur Baldwin, respectively the second and third Earls Baldwin of Bewdley. Louisa wrote novels, short stories, and poetry, sometimes credited under her married name "Mrs Alfred Baldwin".
