= Philip Burne-Jones =

English artist (1861–1926)

Sir Philip Burne-Jones Bt
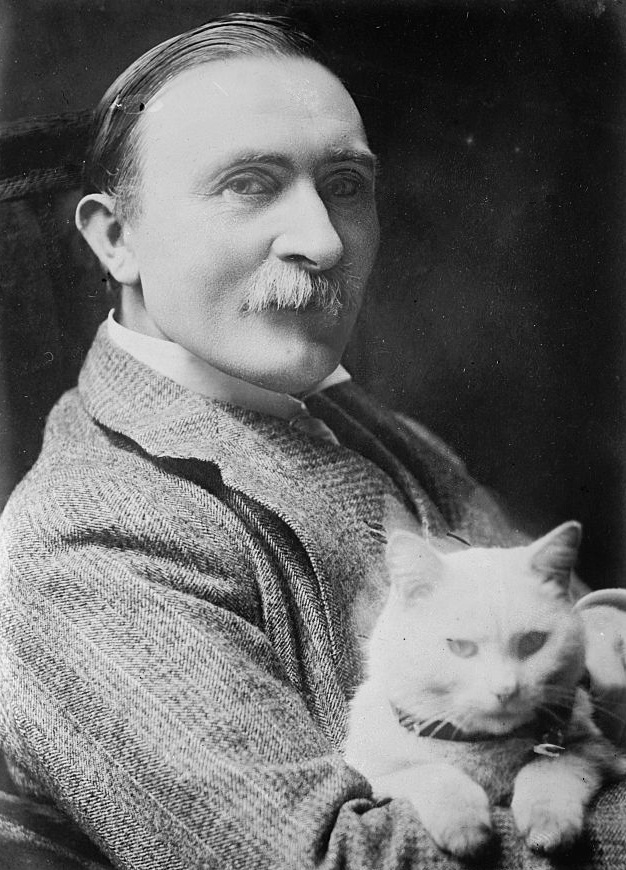
- Formal portrait of Philip Burne-Jones in mid-life
- Born: 1 October 1861; London, England
- Died: 21 June 1926 (aged 64); London, England
- Relatives: John William Mackail (brother-in-law); Angela Thirkell (niece); Denis Mackail (nephew); Clare Mackail (niece)

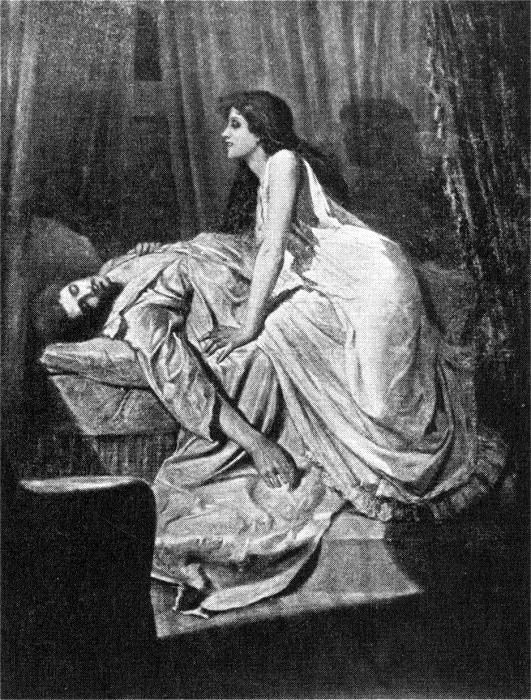
A black and white reproduction of The Vampire, Burne-Jones's most famous work (1897)

Sir Philip William Burne-Jones, 2nd Baronet (1 October 1861 – 21 June 1926), was a Victorian Era British aristocrat, whose life and professional career as a painter spanned into the Edwardian. He was the first child of more famed British Pre-Raphaelite artist Sir Edward Burne-Jones and his wife Georgiana Macdonald, and a cousin of both author Rudyard Kipling and prime minister Stanley Baldwin. He produced more than 60 paintings, including portraits, landscapes, and poetic fantasies.

== Life and career ==
He was born in London, England, in 1861 and was educated at Marlborough College. He attended Oxford University for two years, but left before graduating. To appease his parents for this failure, he agreed to take lessons in painting in London.

Philip studied painting seriously. His skill was great and he exhibited his work in well-known galleries in London and Paris. The Royal Academy exhibited his work eleven times between 1898 and 1918, and his work was also shown in the Paris Salon of 1900. There he exhibited his portrait of his father, now in the National Portrait Gallery. He painted portraits of many well-known people.

His most famous work, The Vampire (1897), depicting a woman leaning over an unconscious man, was believed to have been modelled by the actress Mrs Patrick Campbell, with whom Burne-Jones had been associated romantically. The painting also inspired his cousin Rudyard Kipling's poem of the same name. The location of the original painting is unknown. In July 1902 several papers including the Baltimore Sun and the St. Louis Republic reported the painting was sold to W.K. Vanderbilt; however, Burne-Jones denied the reports.

Having a famous father was difficult for him, and it was Philip's fate in life that his work was often compared unfavourably with that of his father.

Upon his father's death in 1898, Philip succeeded to the title of baronet that had been bestowed on his father during 1894. It is said that his father had accepted the title only because Philip was keen to inherit it.

Philip visited the United States during 1902, where he was popular in fashionable society and contributed to the then-fashionable travelogue literary genre by publishing an account (Dollars and Democracy) of his time spent there. He lived most of his life in London, where he died in 1926.

== Racial views ==
Philip expressed racist attitudes toward Black Americans in his 1904 American travelogue Dollars and Democracy. Burne-Jones stated that he did not think highly of negroes and was sceptical of their belonging in American society. He wrote "among a highly civilized and strenuous people the negroes are in an absolutely false position," "the negro is not, and can never be, the equal of his white brother," and considering "exceptions here and there, the best that can be said for them is that they make tolerably good servants." In spite of holding these commonly held views, he was aware they were exaggerated by his conditioning, a reflection of where he grew up, how, and when: "When aversion to race is instinctive and deep-seated, it is a bit difficult to write fairly on the subject"; and repeatedly offered his regrets and commiseration over their difficult situation in America, stating it was a "real tragedy", for which "they deserve our profound sympathy". He summed up his overview on the matter in his final remark on the subject: "I am sorry for the negroes, and I wish they weren't in America at all."

Baronetage of the United Kingdom
Preceded by Edward Coley Burne-Jones	Baronet (of Rottingdean and of the Grange); 1898–1926	Extinct
