= Frederic W. MacDonald =

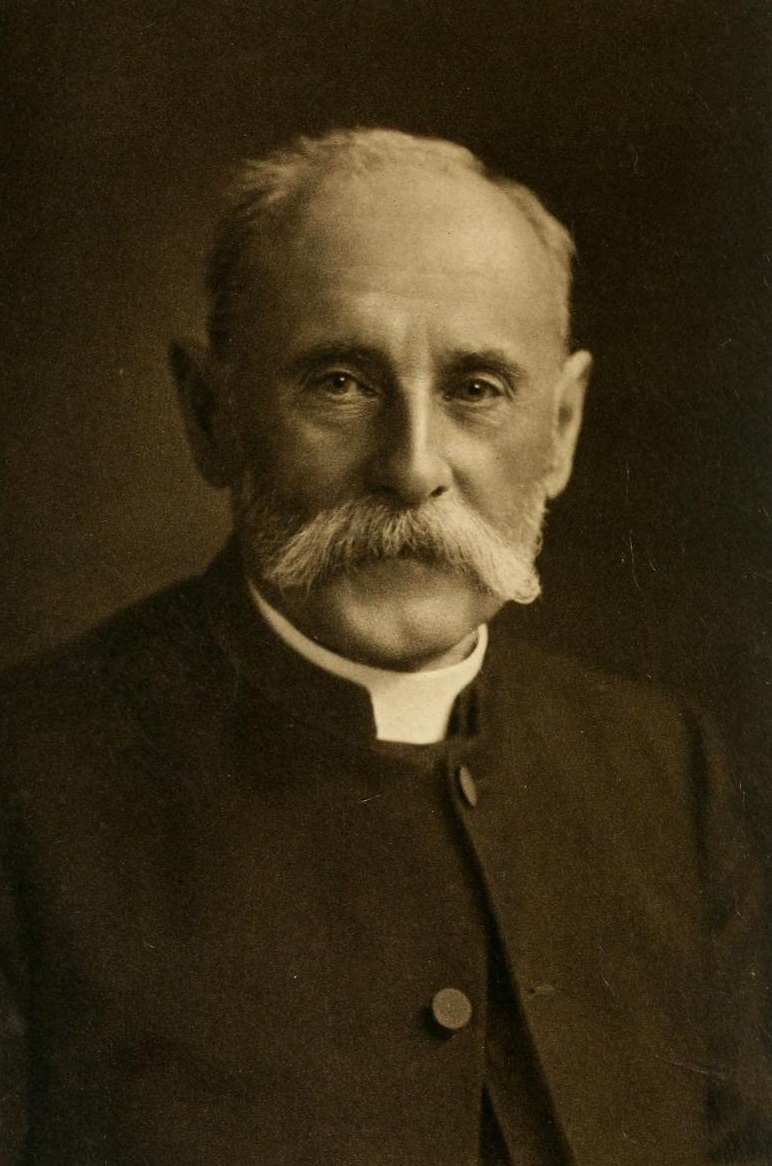
- Frederic W. MacDonald
- Born: 25 February 1842; Leeds, Yorkshire
- Died: 16 October 1928 (aged 86); Bournemouth, Dorset
- Occupations: Cleric and writer
- Relatives: MacDonald sisters (sisters); Rudyard Kipling (nephew); Stanley Baldwin (nephew)

The Reverend Frederic William MacDonald (25 February 1842 – 16 October 1928) was an English cleric and writer.

== Biography ==
He was born in Leeds, Yorkshire, being the second son, and fifth child then living, of George Browne Macdonald, a Wesleyan Methodist minister, and his wife Hannah Jones. Rev. MacDonald was married twice, first to Mary Cork on 11 August 1866 and then to Elizabeth Anne Wright on 25 July 1916. His sisters were members of the famed Birmingham Set.

He died in Bournemouth, Dorset.

== Works ==
- The Dogmatic Principle in Relation to Christian Belief (1881).
- Fletcher of Madeley (1886).
- The Life of William Morley Punshon, LL.D. (1887).
- The Latin Hymns in the Wesleyan Hymn Book (1899).
- The Shining Hour (1900).
- In a Nook with a Book (1907).
- Recreations of a Book-Lover (1911).
- Reminiscences of my Early Ministry (1913).
- Some Pictures on my Walls (1914).
- As a Tale that is Told: Recollections of Many Years (1919).

== See also ==
- MacDonald Sisters
