= Alice Kipling =

English writer and poet (1837–1910)

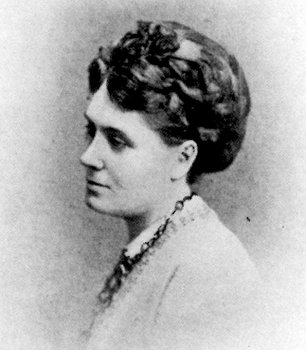
- Kipling in 1870
- Born: Alice Caroline MacDonald; 4 April 1837; Sheffield, England
- Died: 22 November 1910 (aged 73); Wiltshire, England
- Spouse: John Lockwood Kipling (m. 1865)
- Children: Rudyard Kipling

Alice Caroline Kipling (4 April 1837 – 22 November 1910) was one of the MacDonald sisters, Englishwomen of the Victorian era, four of whom were notable for their contribution to the arts and their marriages to well-known men. A writer and poet, she was the mother of the author Rudyard Kipling, aunt of British Prime Minister Stanley Baldwin, and sister-in-law of Edward Poynter and Edward Burne-Jones.

== Early years ==
Alice Kipling was born as Alice Caroline MacDonald in Sheffield, England in 1837, the eldest of the five surviving daughters of Reverend George Browne MacDonald (1805–1868), a Wesleyan Methodist minister, and Hannah Jones (1809–1875).

In her youth Alice MacDonald wrote sonnets. She was described as:

"...slender, pale complexion, dark brown hair and grey eyes, with black lashes and delicately pencilled eyebrows. In those eyes lay the chief fascination of her face. So expressive were they that they seemed to deepen or pale in colour according to passing emotion .. it was impossible to predict how she would act at any given point. There was a certain fascination in this, and fascinating she certainly was..."

== Marriage and India ==
John Lockwood Kipling and Alice Kipling in India in 1870

John Lockwood Kipling and Alice MacDonald met in 1863 and courted at Rudyard Lake in Rudyard, Staffordshire, England. They married in St Mary Abbots Church, Kensington on 18 March 1865 and moved to India later the same year. They had been so moved by the beauty of the Rudyard Lake area that when their first child was born they named him after it. Two of Alice's sisters married artists: Georgiana was married to the painter Edward Burne-Jones, and her sister Agnes to Edward Poynter. Kipling's most famous relative was his first cousin, Stanley Baldwin, who was Conservative Prime Minister three times in the 1920s and '30s. He was the son of Alice's sister Louisa and her husband Alfred Baldwin.

Harry Ricketts in his biography of Rudyard Kipling wrote of Alice that she:

"...was lively, witty and talented; in a Jane Austen novel she would have been called accomplished. She wrote and published poems, arranged songs, sang and sewed and knew how to run a household. Her racy, gossipy letters captured acquaintances and social situations in phrases that flickered between mischief and malice. Frederic, her younger brother, thought her 'keen, quick and versatile' beyond anyone he had ever known. She 'saw things at a glance', he recalled, 'and dispatched them in a word'. Her poems showed another side, revealing a deep strain of melancholy..."

In January 1865, John Lockwood Kipling was made Architectural Sculptor and Professor of Modelling at the School of Art and Industry in Bombay. Alice became the mother of Rudyard Kipling on 30 December 1865. In Simla, Lord Dufferin once said, "Dullness and Mrs Kipling cannot exist in the same room."

== Later life ==
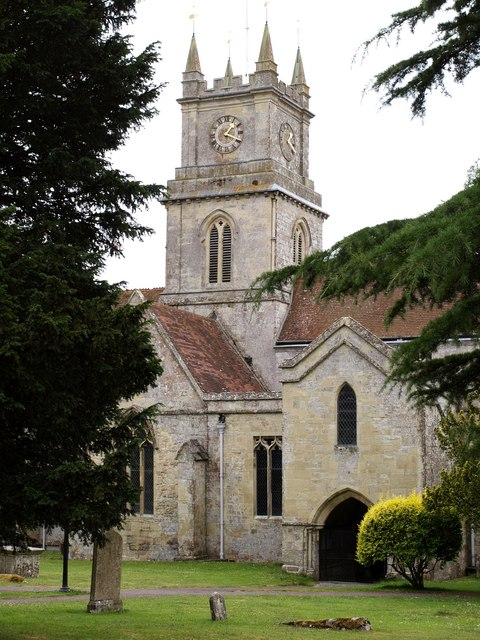
Alice Kipling is buried beside her husband in the churchyard of St John the Baptist church, Tisbury, Wiltshire

Alice Kipling and John Lockwood Kipling remained in India for many years, including during the period when their children were being educated in England. Alice Kipling published much less of her writing than did her sisters, but some of her poems were published in collections including Quartette (1885) and in Hand in Hand: Verses by a Mother and a Daughter (1901), the latter a collaboration with her daughter Alice Fleming (1868–1948).

She died at age 73 in November 1910, three days after suffering a heart attack and is buried beside her husband in the churchyard of St John the Baptist in Tisbury in Wiltshire, England.

Alice Kipling features in the 2002 biography A Circle of Sisters: Alice Kipling, Georgiana Burne-Jones, Agnes Poynter and Louisa Baldwin by Judith Flanders.

== Gallery ==
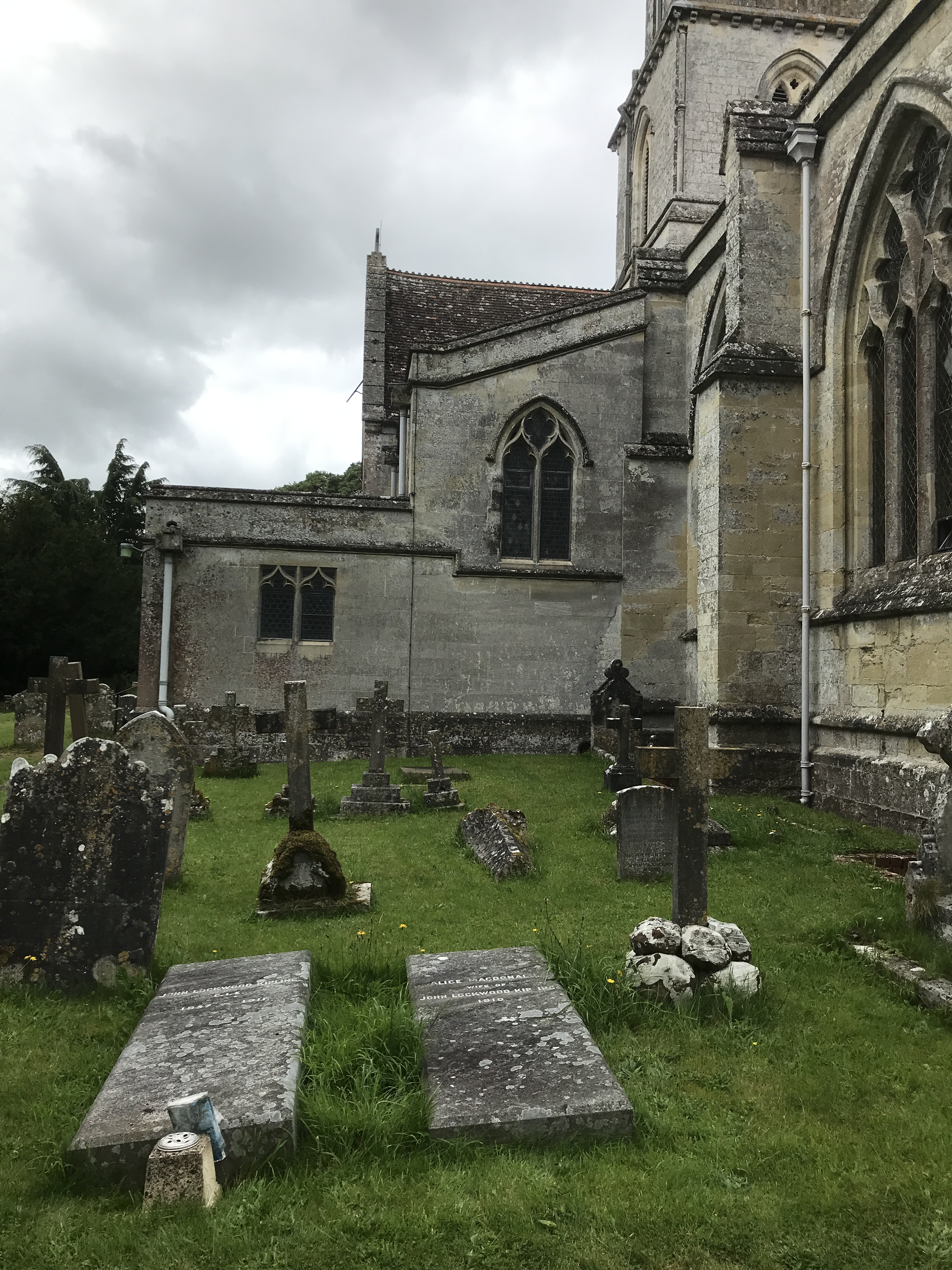
Graves of John Lockwood Kipling and Alice Kipling, St John the Baptist Church, Tisbury, Wiltshire, England.

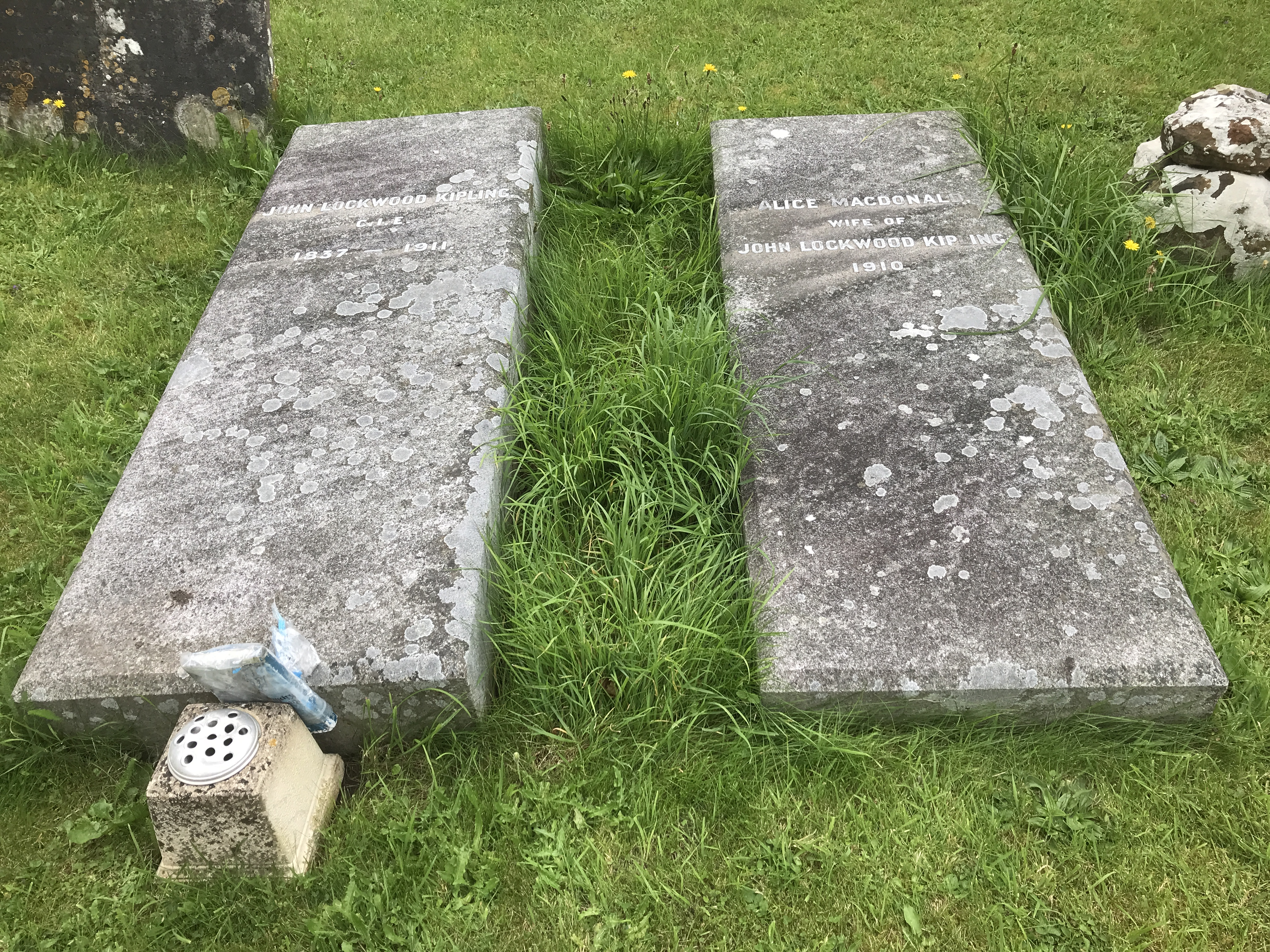
Graves of John Lockwood Kipling and Alice Kipling, St John the Baptist Church, Tisbury, Wiltshire, England.

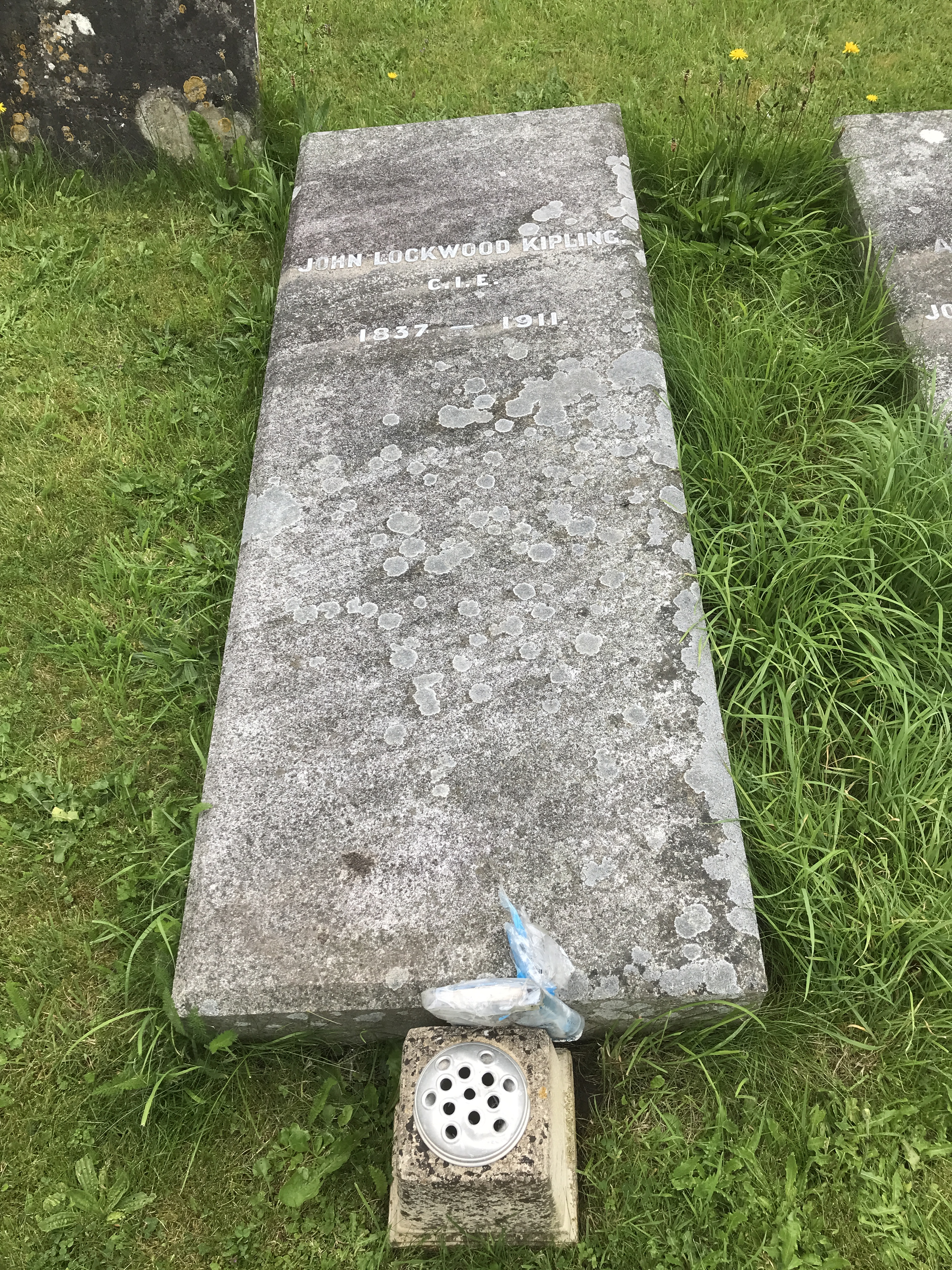
Grave of John Lockwood Kipling, St John the Baptist Church, Tisbury, Wiltshire, England.

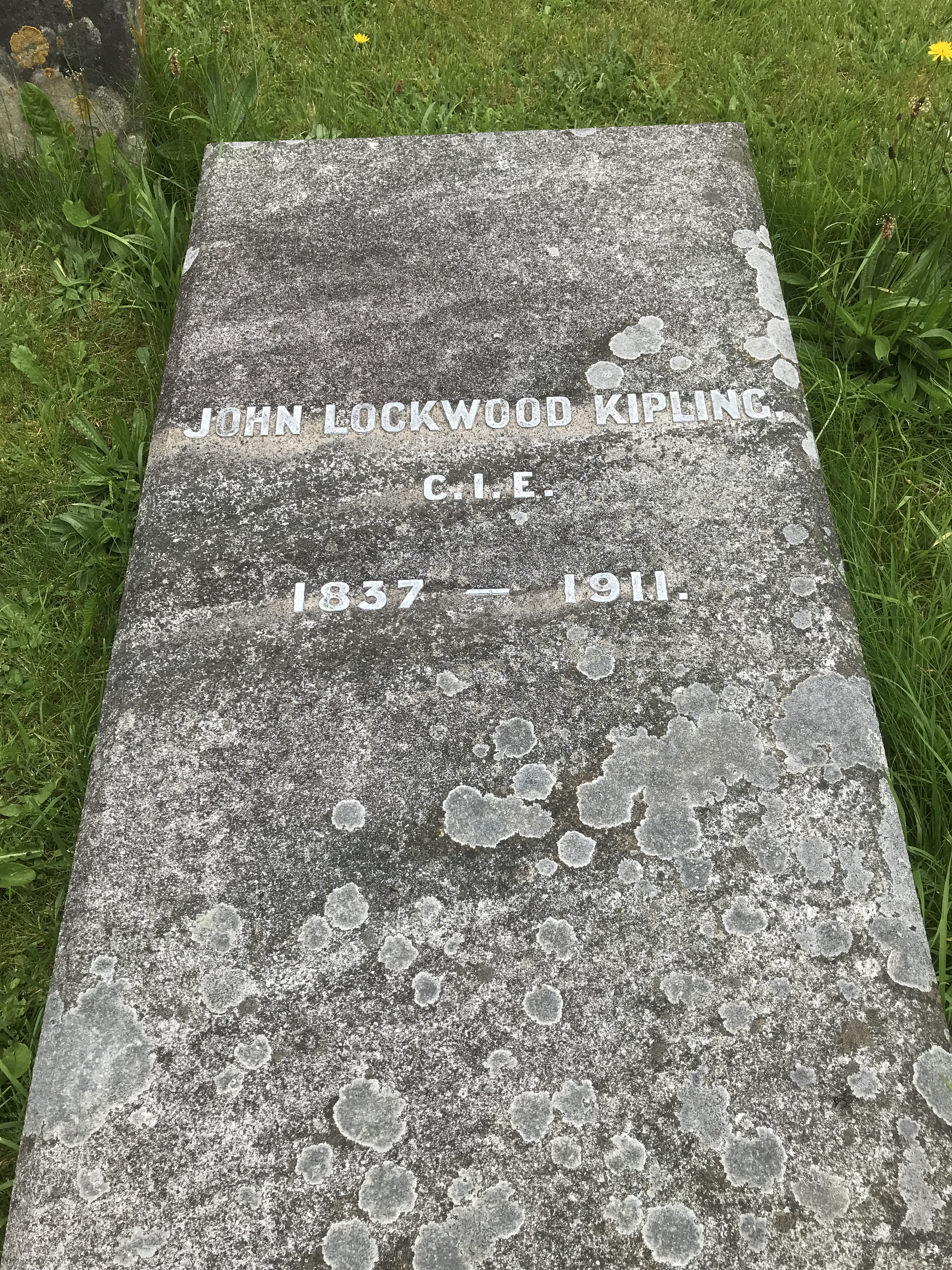
Grave of John Lockwood Kipling, St John the Baptist Church, Tisbury, Wiltshire, England.

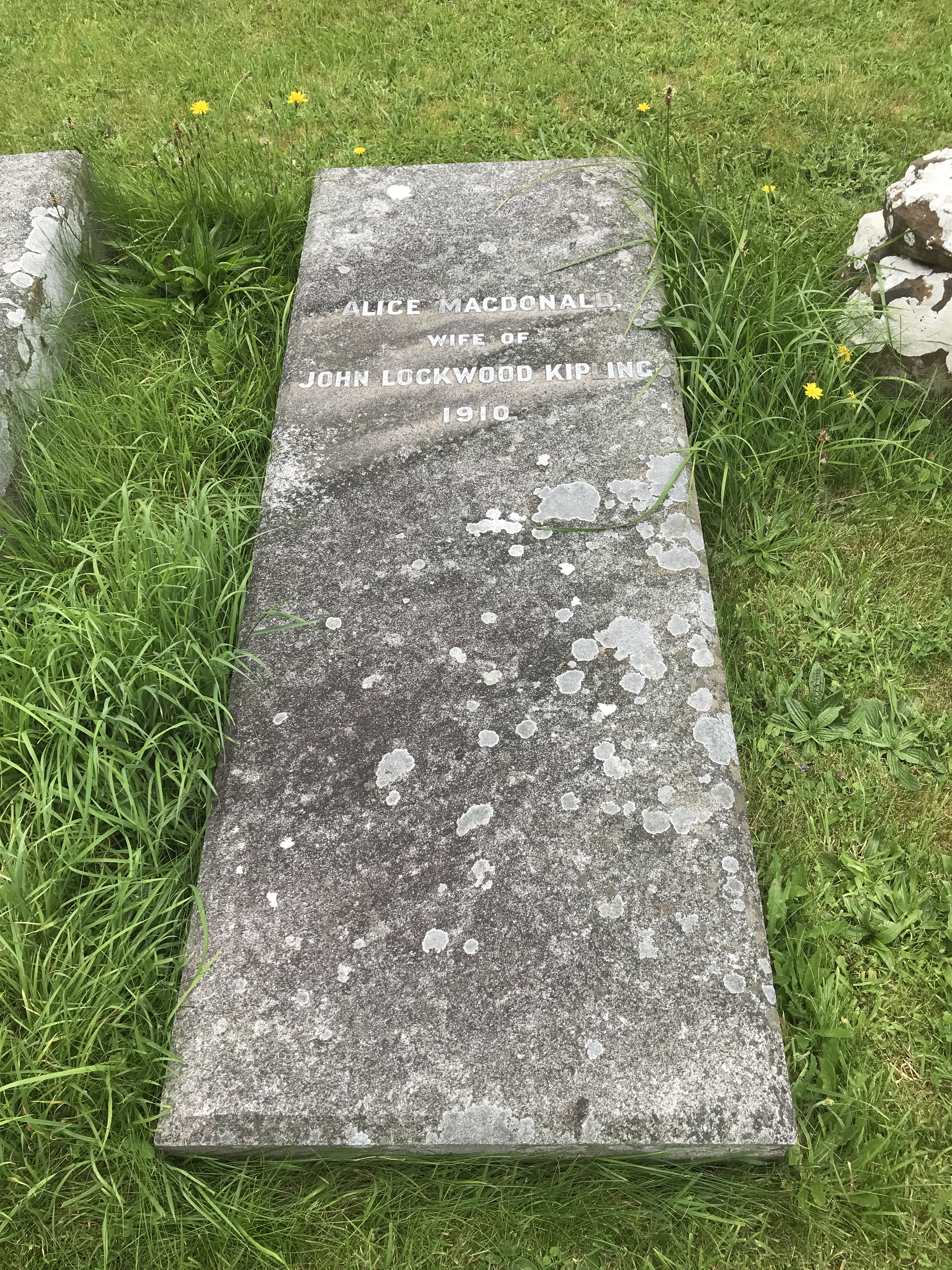
Grave of Alice Kipling, St John the Baptist Church, Tisbury, Wiltshire, England.

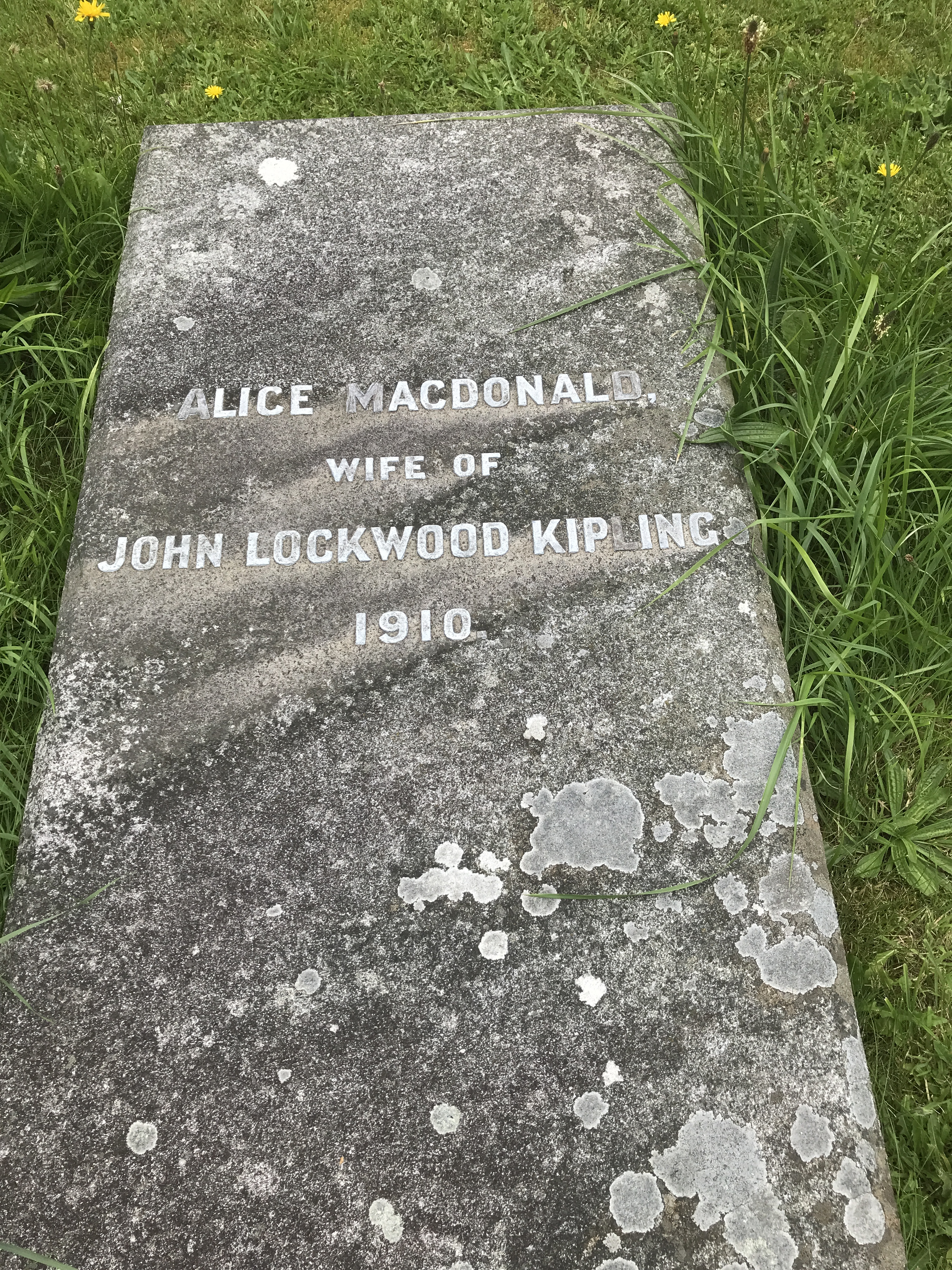
Grave of Alice Kipling, St John the Baptist Church, Tisbury, Wiltshire, England.
