= John Lockwood Kipling =

English artist (1837–1911)

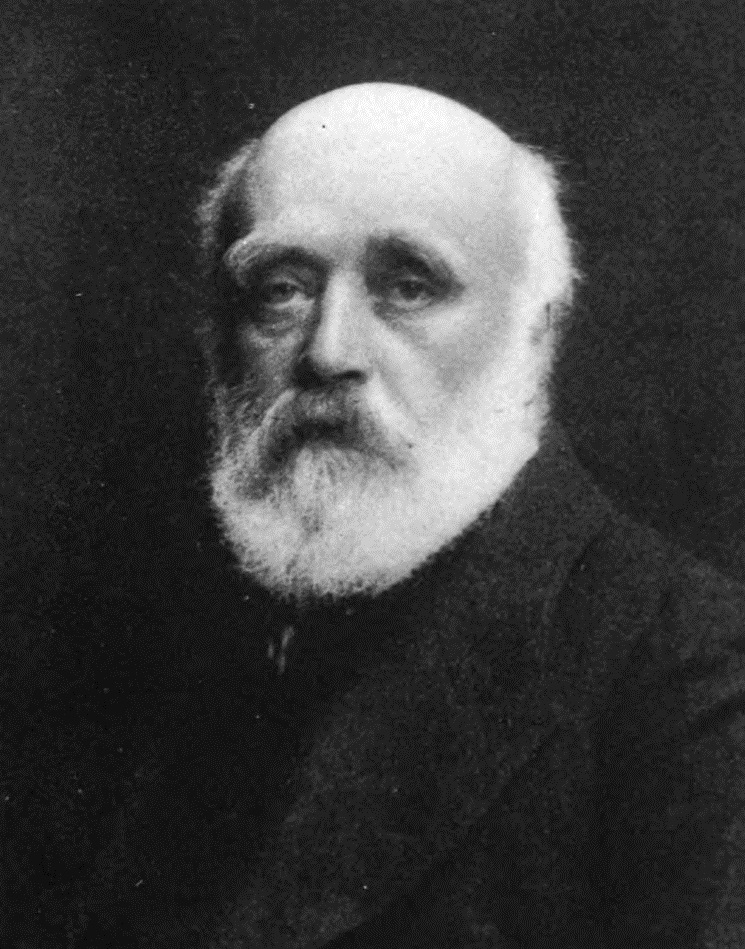
- Kipling before 1899
- Born: 6 July 1837; Pickering, North Yorkshire, England
- Died: 26 January 1911 (aged 73); Tisbury, Wiltshire, England
- Occupations: Art teacher, illustrator, museum curator
- Spouse: Alice McDonald (m. 1865)
- Children: Rudyard Kipling

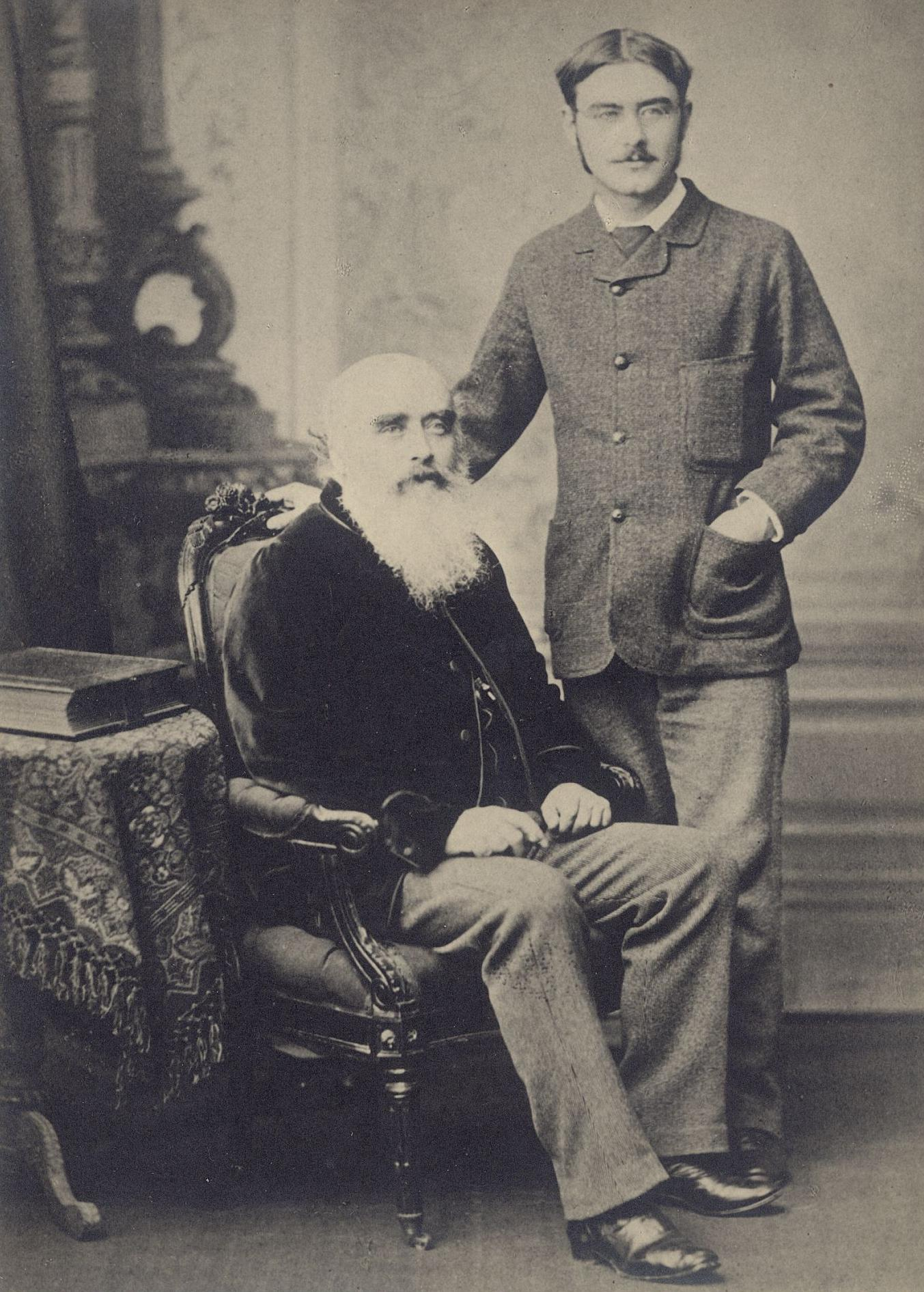
John Lockwood Kipling and Rudyard Kipling, c.1890

John Lockwood Kipling CIE (6 July 1837 – 26 January 1911) was an English art teacher, illustrator and museum curator who spent most of his career in India. He was the father of the author Rudyard Kipling.

== Life and career ==
Lockwood Kipling was born in Pickering, North Riding, the son of Reverend Joseph Kipling and Frances née Lockwood, and was educated at Woodhouse Grove School, a Methodist boarding school. He met his wife Alice MacDonald while working in Burslem, Staffordshire, where his designs can still be seen on the façade of the Wedgwood Institute.

John Lockwood Kipling and Alice Kipling in India during 1870

Alice was the daughter of a Methodist minister, the Reverend George Browne Macdonald. Kipling married during 1865 and relocated with his wife to India, where he had been appointed as a professor of architectural sculpture in the Jeejeebhoy School of Art in Bombay (now Mumbai), and later became its principal.

Their son was born soon after, in December 1865, and was christened Rudyard after Rudyard, Staffordshire, the place where his parents had first met; their daughter Alice also known as Beatrice Kipling was born in 1868. His life-long friend John Griffiths, whom he had met whilst working together at the South Kensington Museum and worked with him at the Bombay School of Art, became Rudyard's godfather. During 1870–1872 Kipling was commissioned by the government to tour the Punjab, North-West Frontier and Kashmir and make a series of sketches of Indian craftsmen as well as various sights and antiquities in these regions. Several of these sketches are presently at the Victoria and Albert Museum whilst others were printed in a number of books.

During 1875, Kipling was appointed the Principal of Mayo School of Arts, Lahore, British India (present day National College of Arts, Pakistan) and also became curator of the old original Lahore Museum which figured as the Wonder House or Ajaib Ghar in Kim, not to be confused with the present one. He retired back to England in 1893.

Kipling illustrated many of Rudyard Kipling's books, and other works, including Tales of the Punjab by Flora Annie Steel. He also worked on the decorations for the Victoria and Albert Museum in London and friezes on the Crawford Market in Bombay. The friezes of the Crawford Market are done in a Romano-Gothic style. The west entrance displays trader and sack-scales with porter, planter and water carrier around a well-head, while the east features several bullock carts. John Kipling designed the uniforms and decorations for the Imperial Assemblage at Delhi during 1877, organised by the Viceroy of India, Lord Lytton, at which Queen Victoria was proclaimed Empress of India.

During his tenure as the Principal of the Mayo School of Art, Lahore, he patronised indigenous artisans and by training and apprenticeship transformed them into craftsmen and designers. One of his protégés was Bhai Ram Singh, who assisted him in his imperial commission for decorating the Durbar Room at Queen Victoria's Osborne House. Kipling also remained editor of the Journal of Indian Art and Industry, which published drawings made by the students of the Mayo School.

He died in 1911, and is buried beside his wife in the churchyard of the parish church of Tisbury, Wiltshire.

During 2017 the Bard Graduate Center, New York, had an exhibition of his work: John Lockwood Kipling: Arts & Crafts in the Punjab and London.

== Main published works ==
- Beast and Man in India: A Popular Sketch of Indian Animals in Their Relations with the People, Published by Macmillan and Co, London, 1891.
- Inezilla: A Romance in Two Chapters, by J.L.K. Reprinted from The Chameleon, Allahabad, [1873].
- Across the Border: Or, Pathân and Biloch, by Edward Emmerson Oliver, Illustrations by John Lockwood Kipling. Published by Chapman and Hall, 1890.
- Tales of the Punjab Told by the People, by Flora Annie Webster Steel, Richard Carnac Temple, John Lockwood Kipling. Published by Macmillan and co., 1894.
- The Two Jungle Books, by Rudyard Kipling. Illustrations by J. Lockwood Kipling, C.I.E., and W. H. Drake. Published by Doubleday, Doran & Company, Inc., New York, 1893.

== Gallery ==
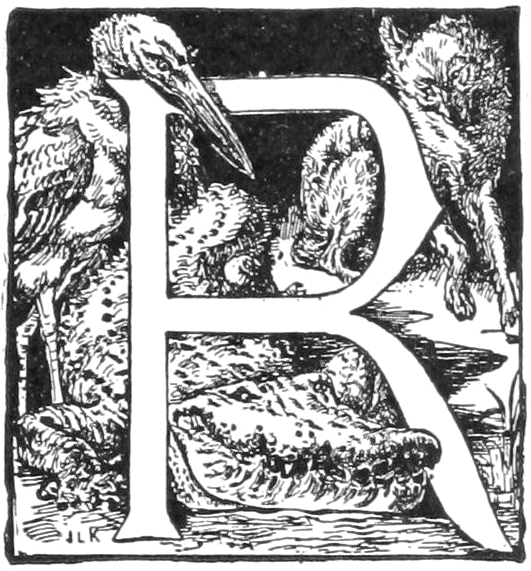
Illustration for a chapter capital in the 1895 edition of The Two Jungle Books (1895), a compilation of The Jungle Book and The Second Jungle Book, both by his son, Rudyard Kipling.

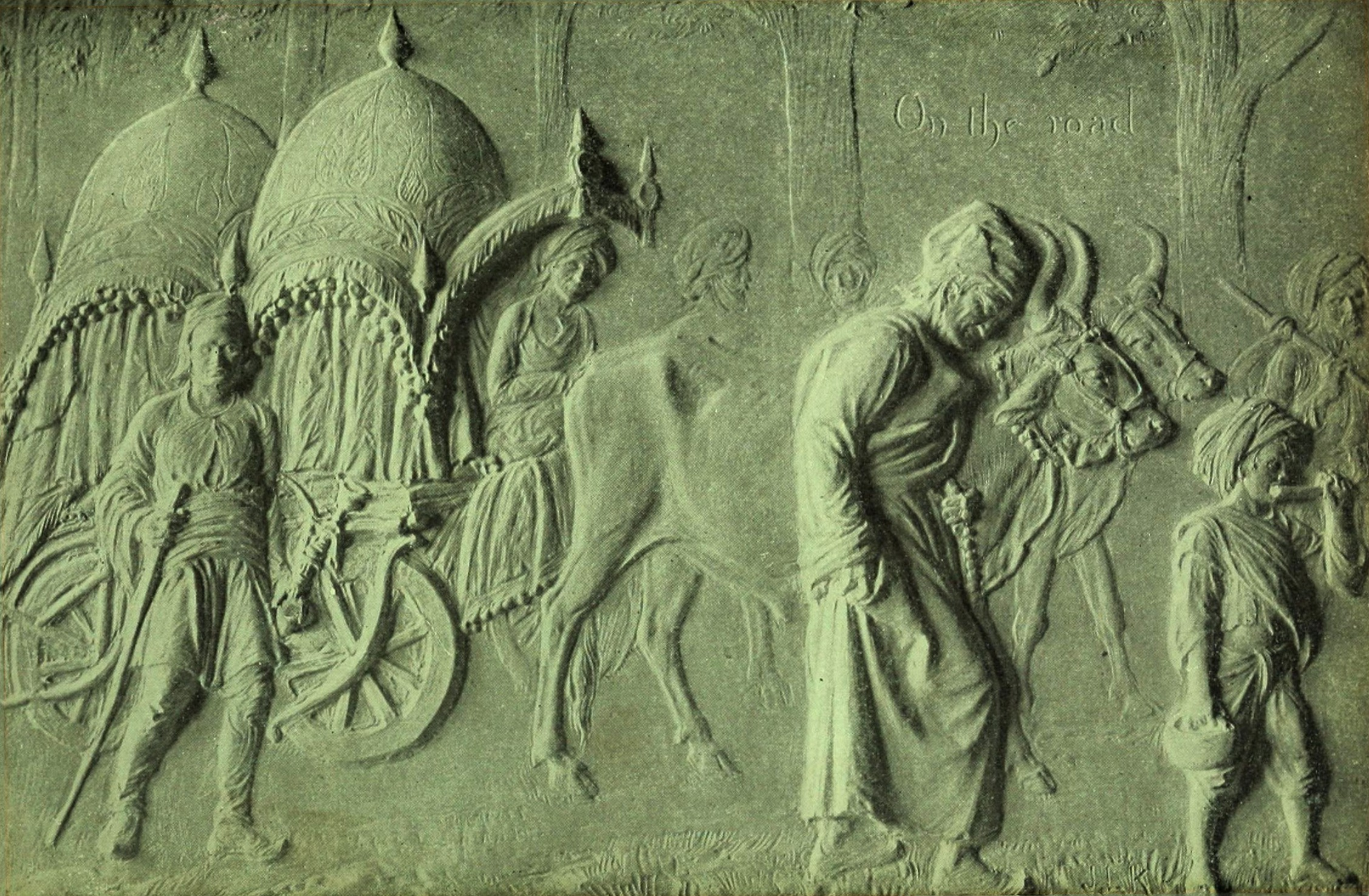
Bas-relief from a series illustrating Kim.

Mayo College, Ajmer, India Coat of Arms designed by (John) Lockwood Kipling.

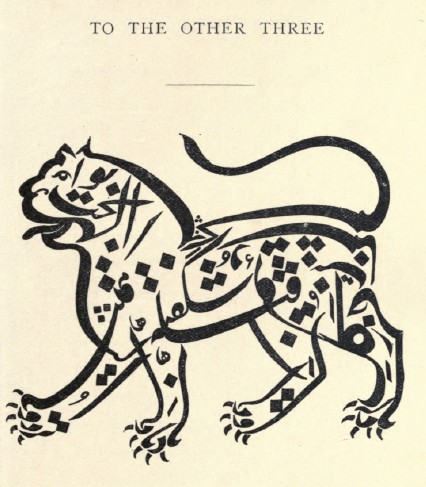
Cryptic dedication page with Arabic inscriptions.

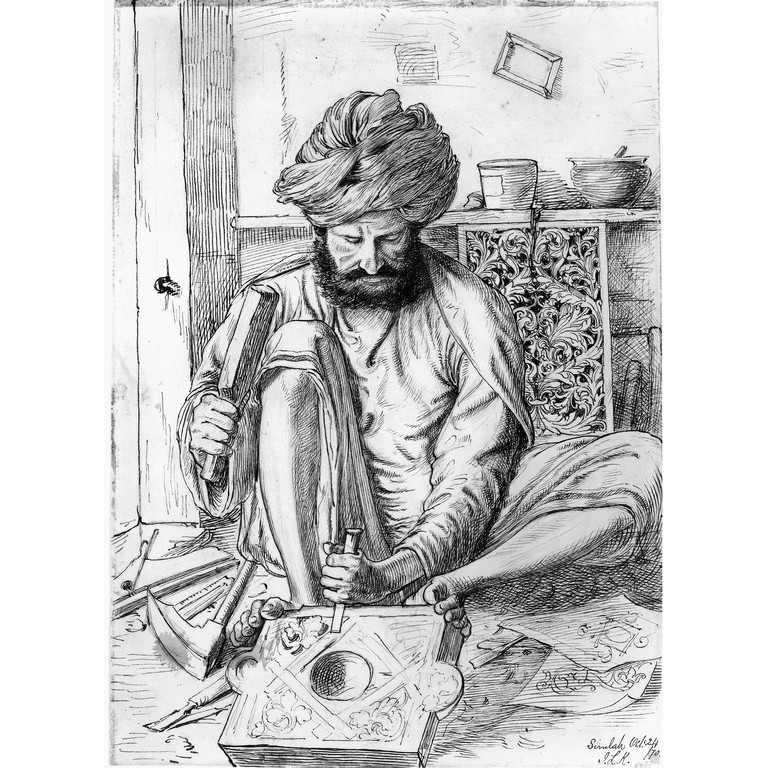
Wood Carver at Shimla, pencil and ink drawing by J. Lockwood Kipling, 1870.

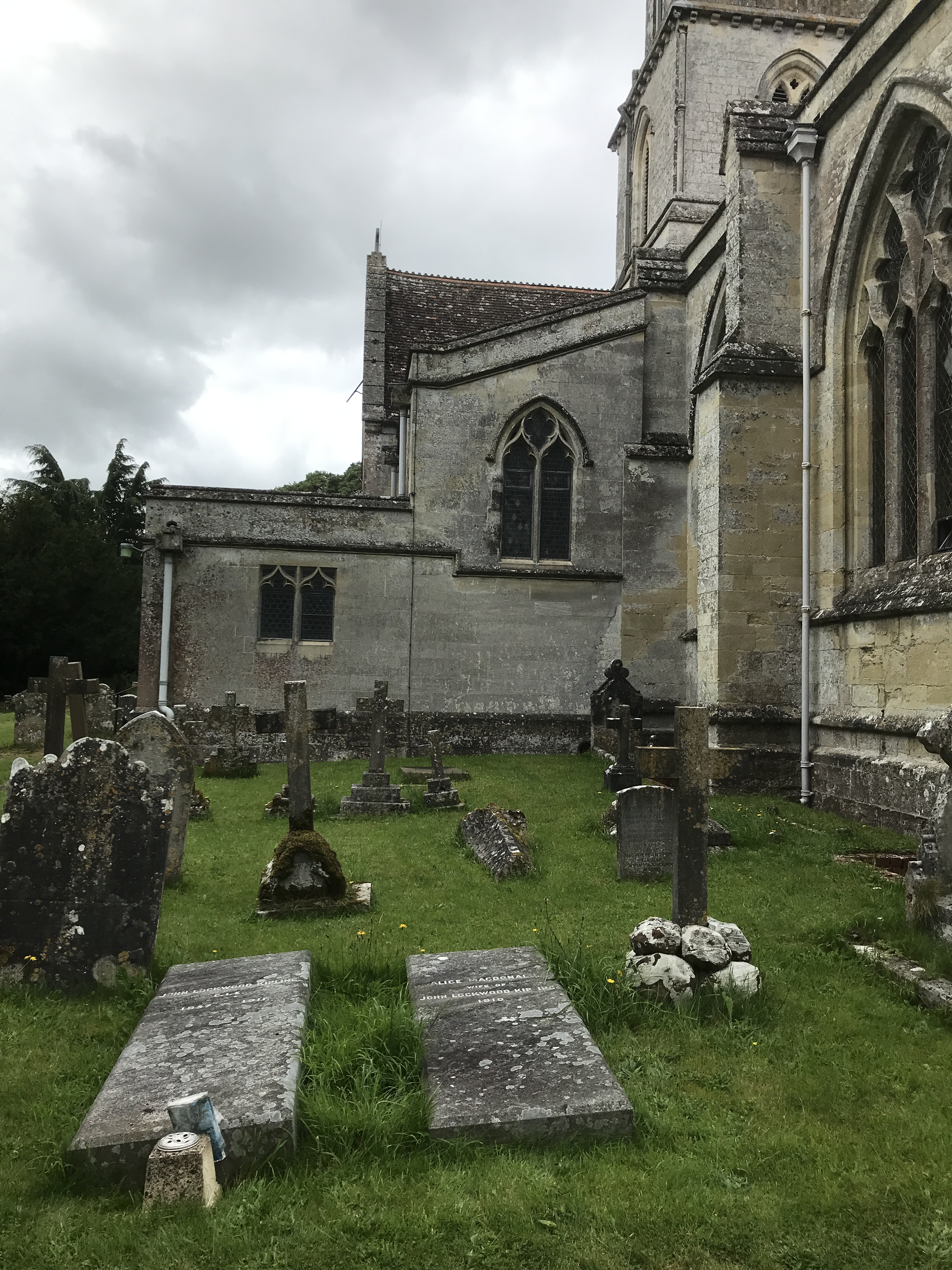
Graves of John Lockwood Kipling and Alice Kipling, St John the Baptist Church, Tisbury, Wiltshire, England.

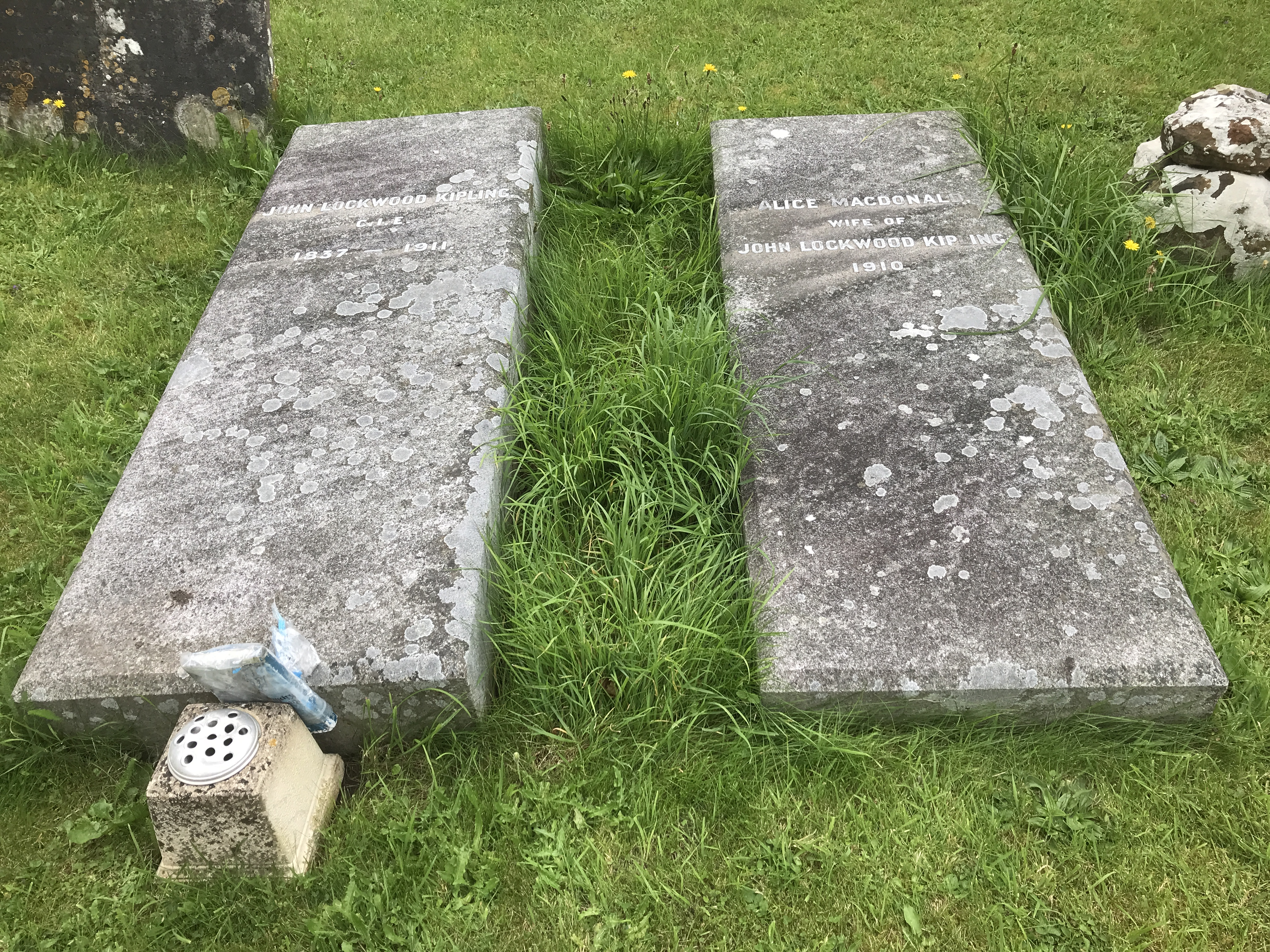
Graves of John Lockwood Kipling and Alice Kipling, St John the Baptist Church, Tisbury, Wiltshire, England.

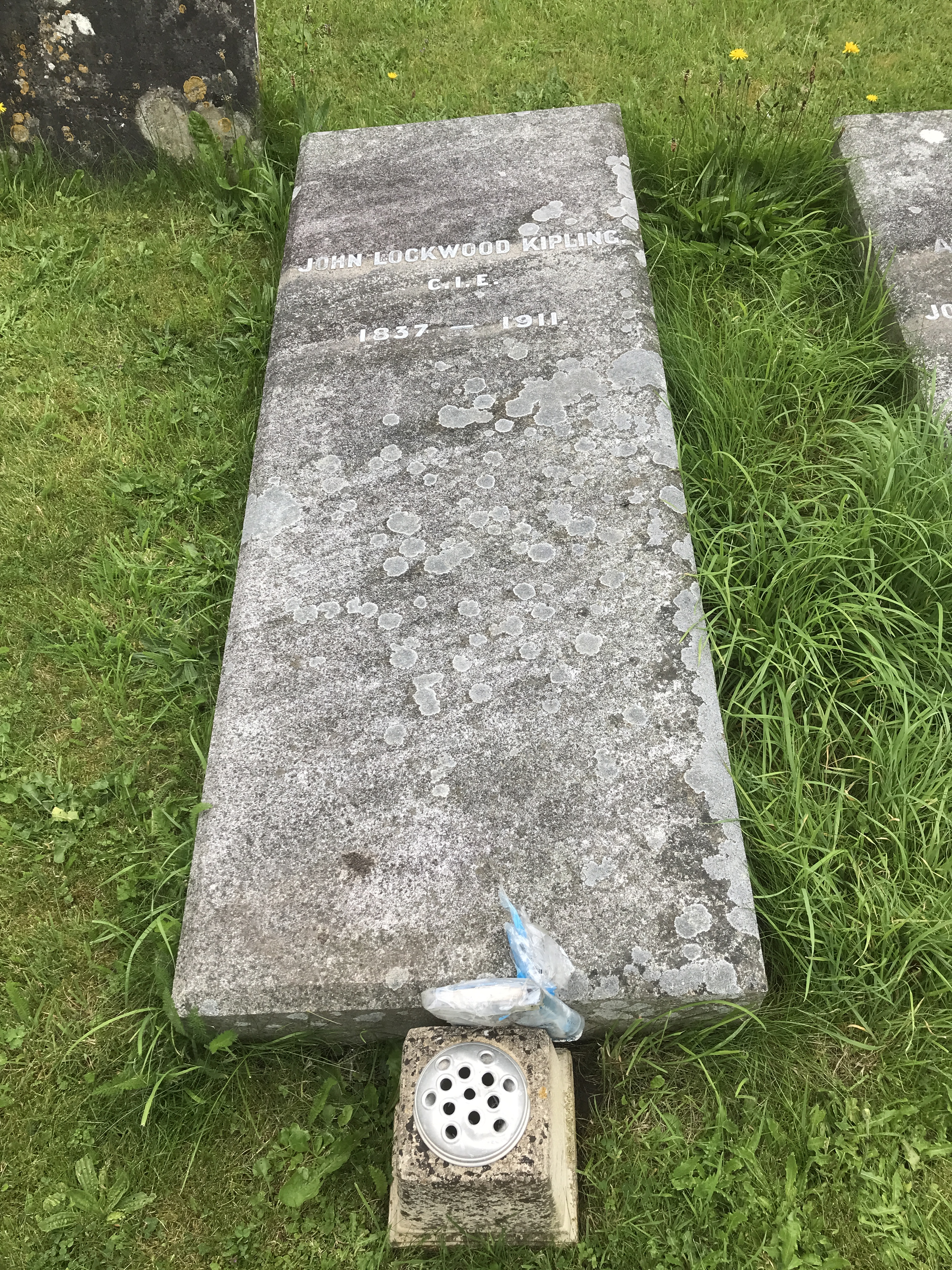
Grave of John Lockwood Kipling, St John the Baptist Church, Tisbury, Wiltshire, England.

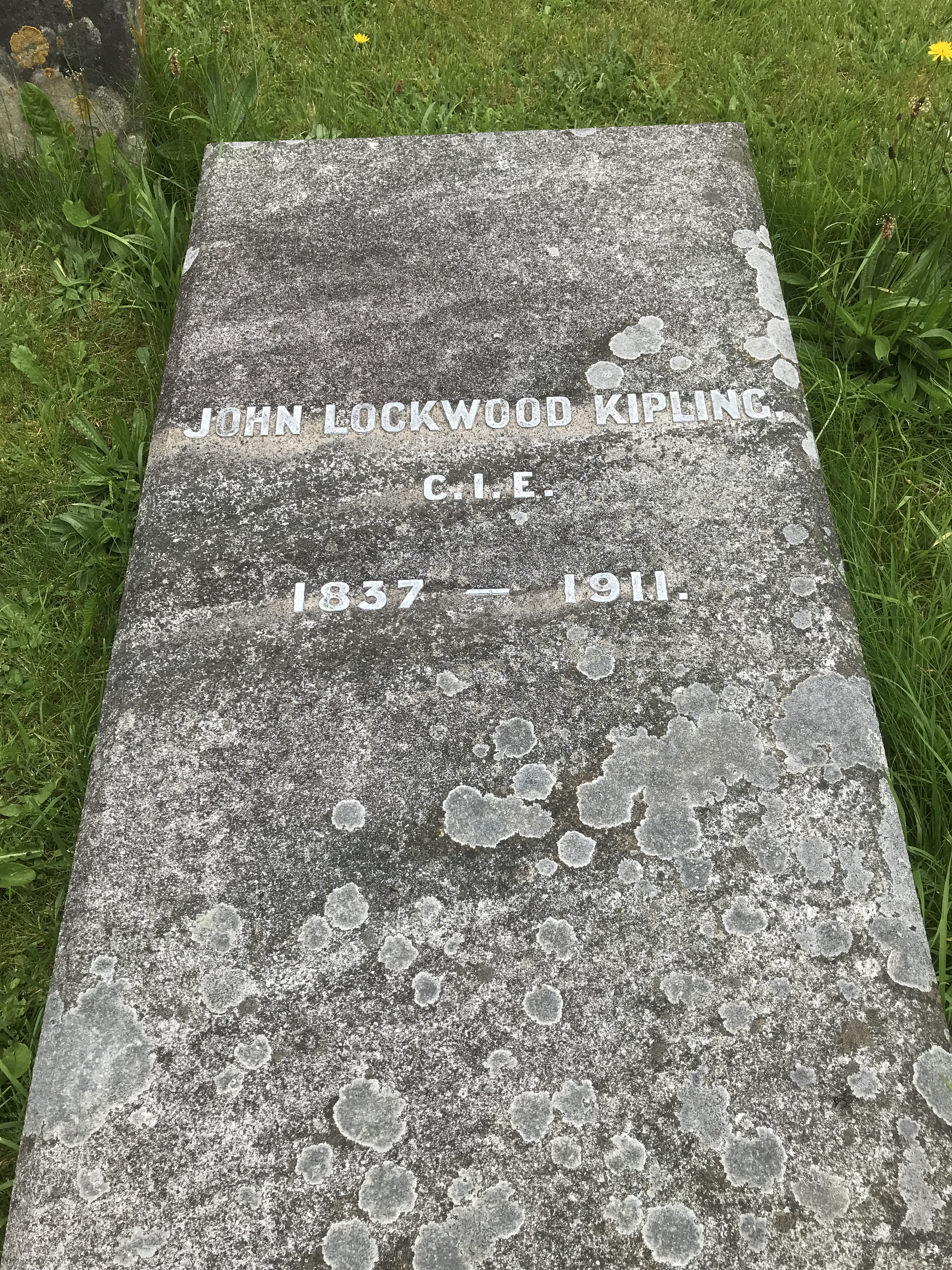
Grave of John Lockwood Kipling, St John the Baptist Church, Tisbury, Wiltshire, England.

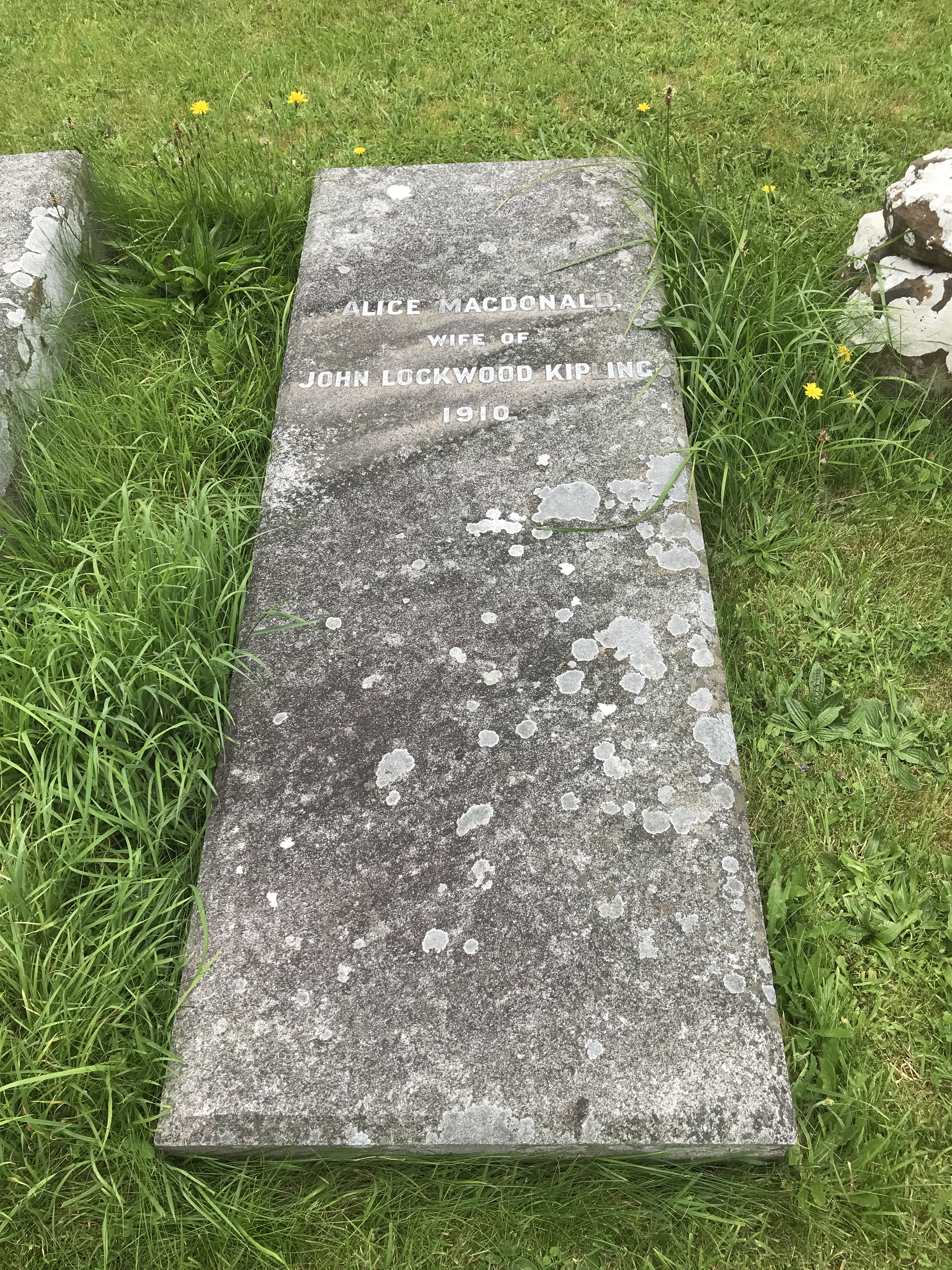
Grave of Alice Kipling, St John the Baptist Church, Tisbury, Wiltshire, England.

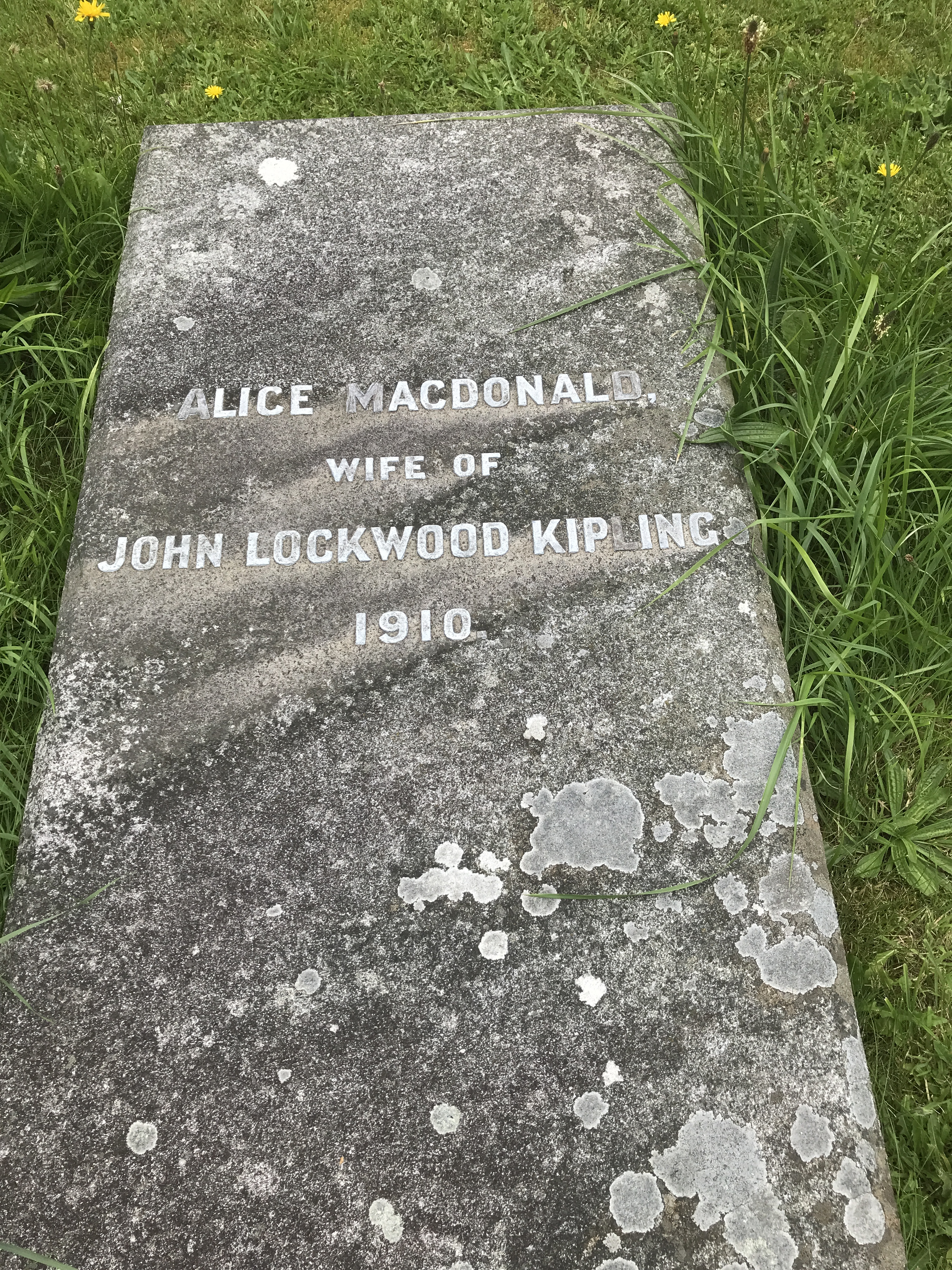
Grave of Alice Kipling, St John the Baptist Church, Tisbury, Wiltshire, England.

== See also ==
- Lockwood Kipling Fountain
