= Birmingham Set =

Group of Arts and Crafts Movement students

The Birmingham Set, sometimes called the Birmingham Colony, the Pembroke Set or later The Brotherhood, was a group of students at the University of Oxford in England in the 1850s, most of whom were from Birmingham or had studied at King Edward's School, Birmingham. Their importance as a group was largely within the visual arts, where they played a significant role in the birth of the Arts and Crafts Movement: The Set were intimately involved in the murals painted on the Oxford Union Society in 1857, and members William Morris, Edward Burne-Jones and Charles Faulkner were founding partners of Morris, Marshall, Faulkner & Co. in 1861.

== Activities and development ==
The group initially met every evening in the rooms of Charles Faulkner in Pembroke College, though by 1856 its dominant figure was Edwin Hatch.

The primary interests of the Birmingham Set were initially literary – they were admirers of Tennyson in particular – and they also read the poetry of Shelley and Keats and the novels of Thackeray, Kingsley and Dickens. The turning point in the group's interests took place when Morris and Burne-Jones, and through them the rest of the group, discovered the writings of Thomas Carlyle and John Ruskin and took to visiting English country churches and making pilgrimages to the medieval cities of France and Belgium.

In 1856 members of the Set published twelve monthly issues of the Oxford and Cambridge Magazine, which was created to propagate the group's views on aesthetics and social reform.

== Members ==
- Charles Joseph Faulkner
- Edward Burne-Jones
- William Morris
- Cormell Price
- Richard Watson Dixon
- Edwin Hatch
- William Fulford
- Harry MacDonald, brother of the MacDonald sisters

== Bibliography ==
- Naylor, Gillian (1971), The Arts and Crafts Movement: a study of its sources, ideals and influence on design theory, London: Studio Vista, ISBN 028979580X
