= Angela Thirkell =

British and Australian novelist (1890–1961)

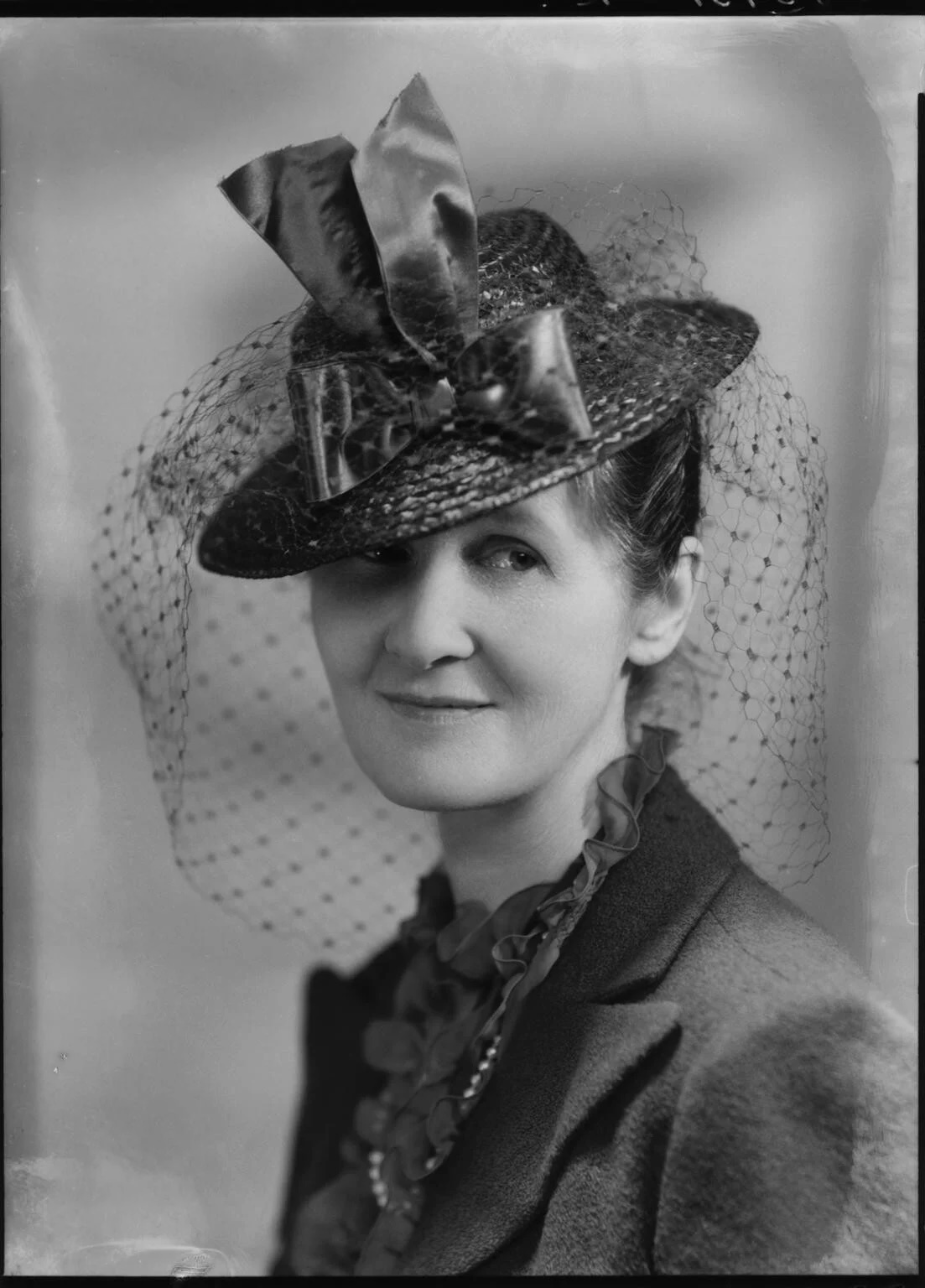
- Thirkell in 1939
- Born: Angela Margaret Mackail; 30 January 1890
- Died: 29 January 1961 (aged 70)
- Education: Claude Montefiore's Froebel Institute
- Parent(s): John William Mackail; Margaret Burne-Jones
- Relatives: Edward Burne-Jones (Grandfather) Denis McKail (Brother); Rudyard Kipling (First cousin once removed) Stanley Baldwin (First cousin once removed)

Angela Margaret Thirkell (/ˈθɜːrkəl/; née Mackail, 30 January 1890 – 29 January 1961) was an English and Australian novelist. She also published one novel, Trooper to Southern Cross, under the pseudonym Leslie Parker.

== Early life ==
Angela Margaret Mackail was the elder daughter of John William Mackail (1859–1945), a Scottish classical scholar and civil servant from the Isle of Bute who was the Oxford Professor of Poetry from 1906 to 1911. Her mother, Margaret Burne-Jones, was the daughter of the Pre-Raphaelite painter Edward Burne-Jones, and through her Thirkell was the first cousin once removed of Rudyard Kipling and Stanley Baldwin. Her brother, Denis Mackail (1892–1971), was also a novelist and they had a younger sister, Clare. Angela was tall, "with legs like columns, and large, masculine feet" and she ruled over her younger cousins and siblings, who called her AKB—Angela Knows Best.

Angela Mackail was educated in London at Claude Montefiore's Froebel Institute, then at St Paul's Girls' School, Hammersmith, and in Paris at a finishing school for young ladies.

== Marriages and children ==
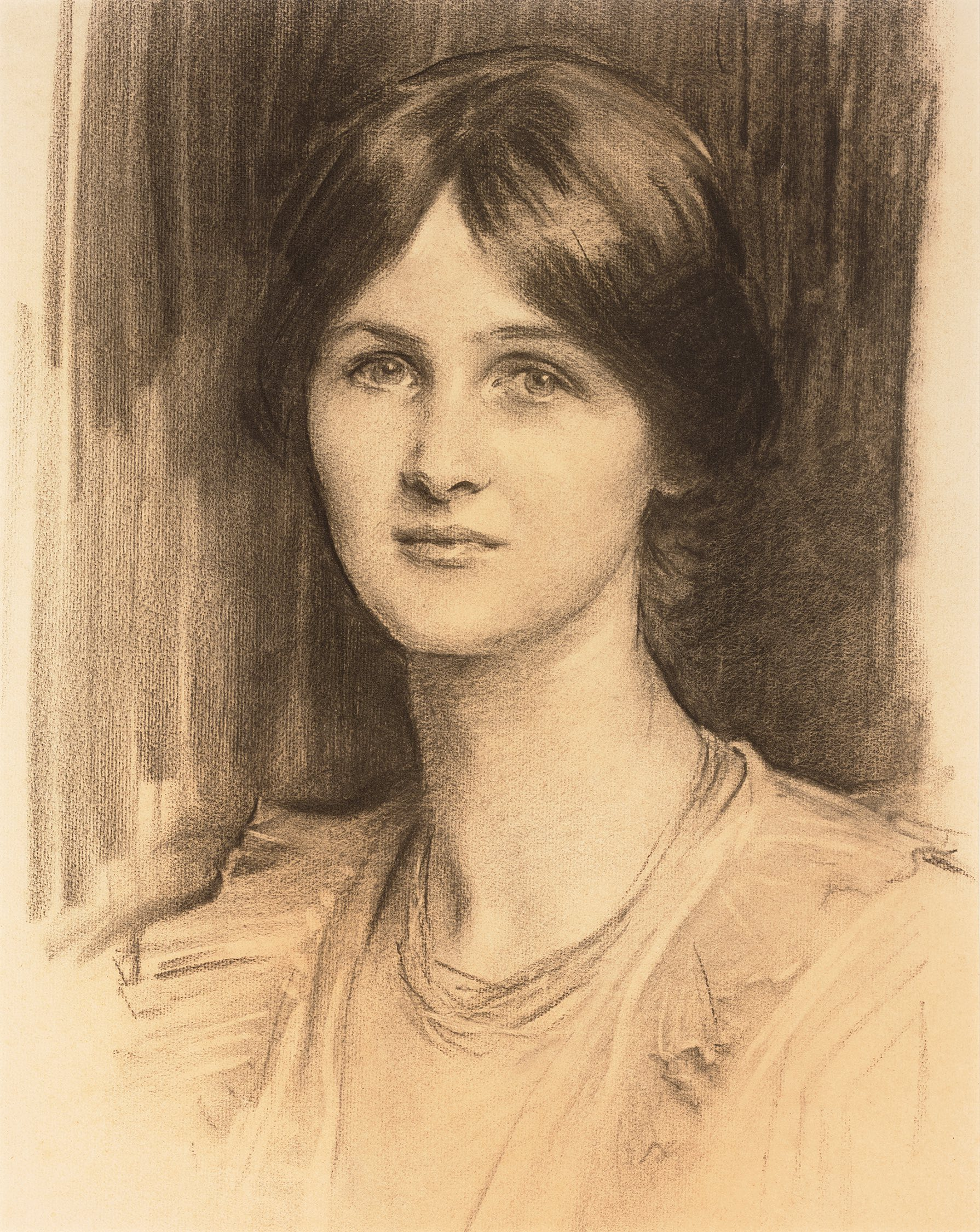
1915 portrait of Angela McInnes, by John Singer Sargent; charcoal on paper

Soon after her return from Paris, Angela Mackail met James Campbell McInnes (1874–1945), a professional singer, and married him in 1911. Their first son was born in January 1912 and named Graham after McInnes's former lover, Graham Peel. Their second son was the novelist Colin MacInnes. A third child, Mary, was born and died in 1917, and Angela then divorced her husband for adultery, in a blaze of publicity. In December 1918 Angela married George Lancelot Allnut Thirkell (1890–c. 1940), an engineer of her own age originally from Tasmania, and in 1920 they sailed for Australia together with her sons. Their son, Lancelot George Thirkell, later Comptroller of the BBC, was born there. The Thirkells led a 'middle-middle-class life' in Melbourne, which to Angela was all deeply unfamiliar and repugnant. So in November 1929 Angela left her husband without warning, returning to England with Lancelot George on the pretext of a holiday but in fact leaving Australia for good.

Lacking money, she begged the fare to London from her godfather, J. M. Barrie, and used the sum intended for her return ticket for two single passages, for herself and her youngest son. She claimed that her parents were aging and needed her but she certainly also preferred the more comfortable life available with them in London. Her second son, Colin, followed her to England soon after but Graham stayed in Melbourne.

Thereafter her "attitude to any man whom she attracted was summed up in the remark: 'It's very peaceful with no husbands'", which was quoted by the Observer newspaper in its column 'Sayings of the Week'.

Thirkell died in 1961 aged 70 and her ashes were buried at St Margaret's Churchyard in Rottingdean, Sussex.

== Writing career ==
Thirkell began writing early in her life in Australia, chiefly through the need for money. She published an article in the Cornhill Magazine in 1921, the first of many articles and short stories, including work for Australian radio. On her return to England in 1929, this career continued with journalism, stories for children, and then novels. Her success as a novelist began with her second novel, High Rising (1933). She set most of her novels in Anthony Trollope's Barsetshire, his fictional English county developed in the six novels known as the Chronicles of Barsetshire. An alert reader of contemporary fiction, Thirkell also borrowed freely from little known titles such as John Galsworthy's The Country House, from which, for example, she lifted the name 'Worsted', which she used for the village setting of her novel August Folly (1936). She also quoted frequently, without attribution, from novels by Charles Dickens, William Thackeray and Elizabeth Gaskell. Thirkell published a new novel every year, which she referred to in correspondence with her editor, Jamie Hamilton of Hamish Hamilton, as new wine in an old bottle. She was upset that her circle of well-educated and upper-middle-class friends thought her novels "too popular" knowing they preferred, as she did, such writers as Gibbon, Austen, Dickens and Proust. She drew the epigraph to T 1951 from Proust: "Les gens du monde se représentent volontiers les livres comme une espèce de cube dont une face est enlevée, si bien que l'auteur se dépêche de 'faire entrer' dedans les personnes qu'il rencontre" ("Society people think that books are a sort of cube, one side of which the author opens the better to insert into it the people he meets.")

Her books of the 1930s in particular had a satiric exuberance, as in Pomfret Towers, which sends up village ways, aristocratic folly and middle-class aspirations. Three Houses (1931, Oxford University Press; repeatedly reprinted) is a short childhood memoir, which simultaneously displays Thirkell's precociously finished style, her lifelong melancholy and her idolisation of her grandfather, Edward Burne-Jones. Trooper to the Southern Cross (1934; republished in 1939 as What Happened on the Boat) "is concerned with the experiences of a number of English and Australian passengers aboard a troop-ship, the Rudolstadt, on their way back to Australia immediately after World War I. It is particularly interesting for its depiction of the Australian 'digger'; his anti-authoritarianism, larrikinism, and, at the same time, his loyalty to those whom he respects". Thirkell's 1936 publication August Folly was chosen as the Book Society's book of the month. This embarrassed her as it seemed to define the book as insufficiently artistic, leading her to write to her publisher that "I can only hope that the financial gain involved will counterbalance the moral degradation."

In the 1940s her work was coloured by the war. The home front figured particularly in Cheerfulness Breaks In (1940), showing how women saw their loved ones off to the front, and Northbridge Rectory, which showed how housewives coped with the annoyances of wartime life. These books include Marling Hall, Growing Up and The Headmistress and provide a vibrant picture of the attitude, struggle and resigned good cheer of British women during the war. Even a book that did not deal exclusively with the war effort, Miss Bunting, addressed changes in society the war had wrought as the title character, a governess, grows to middle age and wonders how to live out her life and where her ambitions might take her as the world turns upside down. These books provide a time capsule of the age, which unfortunately includes charges of anti-semitism. The Warburg family in Cheerfulness Breaks In has been seen by many as a traditional caricature of Jews. Thirkell grew increasingly conservative with the changes wrought by the war. A review of Private Enterprise (1947) wrote: "In Barchester all is not well/The County People pine and sigh/They wish the government in Hell/And long for happier days gone by/When gloom did not obscure the sky."

Later books in the 1950s became more romantic and less contemporary. The Old Bank House in particular shows Thirkell concerned with the rise of the merchant class, her prejudices evident but giving way to grudging respect for industriousness and goodhearted generosity. Later books are simpler romances. The romance The Duke's Daughter deals in a way more directly than some of her others with descendants of Trollope's Barsetshire characters. Her final book, Three Score and Ten, was unfinished at her death but was completed later by C. A. Lejeune. Thirkell showed a keen social sense and a lively eye for the telling detail of everyday life.

Thirkell's works are considered as being in the comedy-of-manners genre along with those of Jane Austen. Rachel Mather sees Thirkell, along with E. F. Benson and E. M. Delafield, as being "direct heirs of the Jane Austen tradition. Other critics agree. The comedy in Thirkell's work is sometimes overlooked today, though it was recognized by contemporaries. In reviewing Summer Half, the humorous magazine Punch called her "one of the great humorous writers of our time" and Norman Collins wrote of Wild Strawberries that "A hundred one times the reader is rewarded by the radiance of that inner grin which comes from sharing some entirely malicious piece of social observation that any man, and most women, would have missed completely. P.G. Wodehouse, the pre-eminent English humorist of her era, praised Wild Strawberries and Pomfret Towers.

== Selected books ==
=== Barsetshire Chronicles ===
- High Rising (1933)
- Wild Strawberries (1934)
- The Demon in the House (1934)
- August Folly (1936)
- Summer Half (1937)
- Pomfret Towers (1938)
- The Brandons (1939)
- Before Lunch (1939/1940)
- Cheerfulness Breaks In (1940)
- Northbridge Rectory (1941)
- Marling Hall (1942)
- Growing Up (1943)
- The Headmistress (1944)
- Miss Bunting (1945)
- Peace Breaks Out (1946)
- Private Enterprise (1947)
- Love Among the Ruins (1948)
- The Old Bank House (1949)
- County Chronicle (1950)
- The Duke's Daughter (1951)
- Happy Returns (1952)
- Jutland Cottage (1953)
- What Did It Mean? (1954)
- Enter Sir Robert (1955)
- Never Too Late (1956)
- A Double Affair (1957)
- Close Quarters (1958)
- Love at All Ages (1959)
- Three Score and Ten (1961)

=== Other books ===
- Ankle Deep (1931)
- Three Houses (1931); reprint. 1998. ISBN 1-55921-215-2.
- Trooper to the Southern Cross (1934; republished as What Happened on the Boat)
- O These Men, These Men! (1935)
- The Grateful Sparrow (1935)
- The Fortunes of Harriet (1936)
- Coronation Summer (1937)
