= Denis Mackail =

English fiction writer, 1892–1971

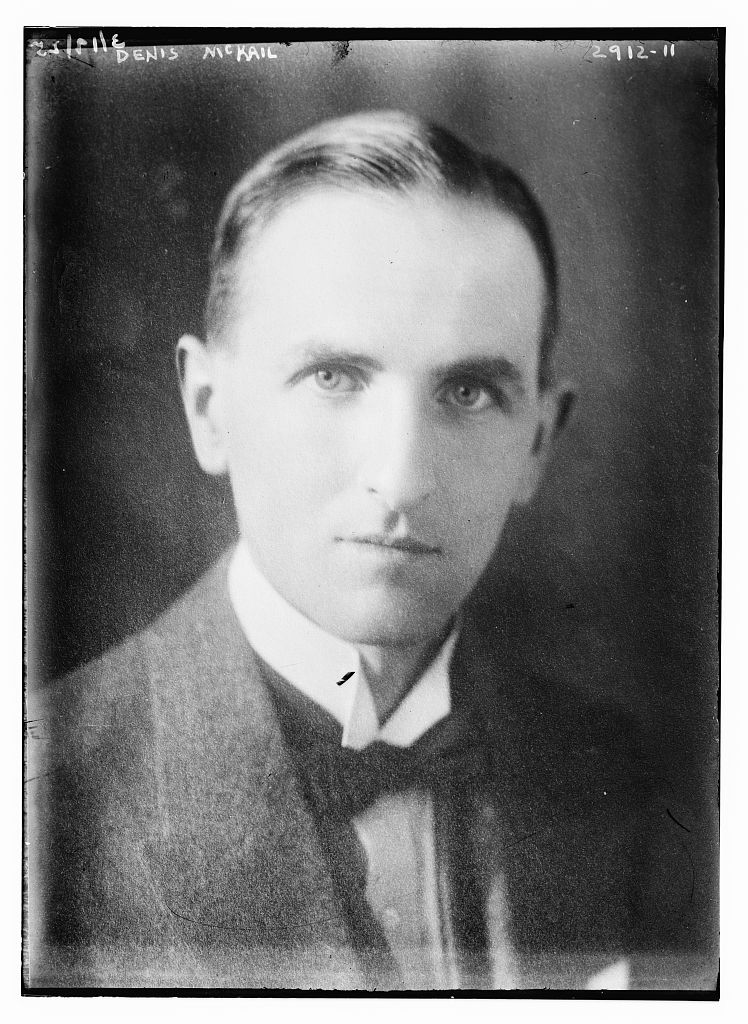
- Born: Denis George Mackail; 3 June 1892; Kensington, London, England
- Died: 4 August 1971 (aged 79); London, England
- Spouse: Diana Granet
- Children: 2
- Parent(s): John William Mackail; Margaret Burne-Jones

Denis George Mackail (3 June 1892 – 4 August 1971) was an English fiction writer. His work was popular in his time, but much of his work has been forgotten. However, Greenery Street, a 1925 novel of early married life in upper middle-class London, was republished in 2002.

== Biography ==
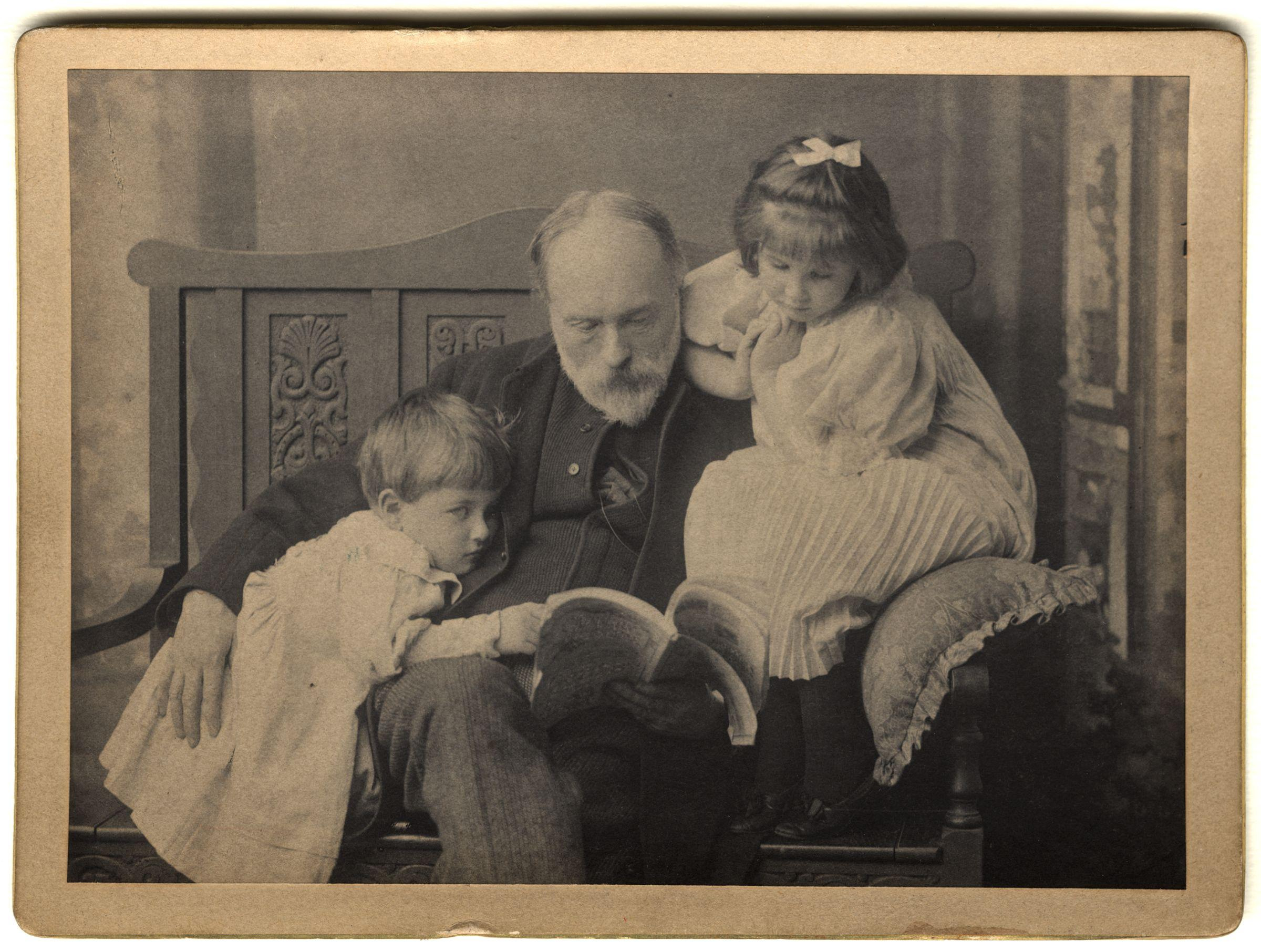
Mackail at the age of three; together with his grandfather, Edward Burne-Jones, and his sister, Angela Thirkell.

Mackail was born in Kensington, London, on 3 June 1892, to John William Mackail and Margaret Burne-Jones, the daughter of the painter Edward Burne-Jones. He was the younger brother of Angela Thirkell. Educated at St Paul's School, Hammersmith, he went to Balliol College, Oxford, but failed to complete his degree through ill-health after two years.

His first work was as a stage-set designer, notably for J. M. Barrie's The Adored One and George Bernard Shaw's Pygmalion (1914). The outbreak of World War I interrupted a promising start in this. Mackail was not fit enough for active service, but took work in the War Office and the Board of Trade.

In 1917 he married Diana Granet, only child of Sir Guy Granet, a War Office director-general for railways. The couple had two children, Mary (born 28 March 1919) and Anne (born 12 January 1922), and lived in Chelsea, London. The need to support his young family led Mackail to write fiction at a time when office jobs became insecure after the end of the war. This led to a first short-story being accepted by the Strand Magazine and to the services of a literary agent, A. P. Watt. Denis was soon earning enough from his writing to give up his office work. He published a novel a year from 1920 to 1938.

Among his literary friends were P. G. Wodehouse and A. A. Milne and the dedication to the UK edition of Wodehouse's Summer Lightning reads "To Denis Mackail, author of 'Greenery Street', 'The Flower Show' and other books which I wish I had written".

During the 1930s Mackail lived at Bishopstone House, Bishopstone, East Sussex.

After a nervous breakdown, Mackail, as therapy, set about writing the official biography of J. M. Barrie, which appeared in 1941. He went on to produce seven more novels and some books of reminiscences, but after the early death of his wife in 1949, he published nothing further and lived quietly in London until his death on 4 August 1971.

== Relatives ==
Mackail's sister was the novelist Angela Thirkell. Through his mother, he was a first cousin once removed of Rudyard Kipling and Stanley Baldwin. He was also a second cousin of Oliver Baldwin.

== Books by Denis Mackail ==
- What Next? (1920)
- Romance to the Rescue (1921)
- Bill the Bachelor (1922)
- According to Gibson (1923)
- Summertime (1923)
- The Majestic Mystery (1924)
- Greenery Street (1925) (republished in 2002 by Persephone Books)
- The Fortunes of Hugo (1926)
- The Flower Show (1927)
- Tales from Greenery Street (1928)
- Another Part of the Wood (1929)
- How Amusing! (1929)
- The Young Livingstones (1930)
- The Square Circle (1930)
- David's Day (1932)
- Ian and Felicity [US title: Peninsula Place] (1932)
- Having Fun (1933)
- Chelbury Abbey (1933)
- Summer Leaves (1934)
- The Wedding (1935)
- Back Again (1936)
- Jacinth (1937)
- London Lovers (1938)
- Morning, Noon and Night (1938)
- The Story of J. M. B. (US title: Barrie, 1941)
- Life with Topsy (1942)
- Upside-down (1943)
- Ho! or, How It All Strikes Me (1944)
- Tales for a Godchild (1944)
- Huddlestone House (1945)
- Our Hero (1947)
- We're Here! (1947)
- Where am I? or A Stranger Here Myself (1948)
- By Auction (1949)
- Her Ladyship (1949)
- It Makes the World Go Round (1950)

== See also ==
- The Queen's Book of the Red Cross

== Sources ==
- "Denis Mackail", Obituaries from The Times, 1971–1975, Reading: Newspaper Archive Developments, 1978
- "Mackail, Denis George", Who Was Who, vol. 7: 1971–1980, London: Black, c. 1982
- Denis Mackail, Life with Topsy, London: Heinemann, 1942
- Bishopstone & Seaford by Pople & Berry: Sutton Press, 1991
