= Architecture of cathedrals and great churches =

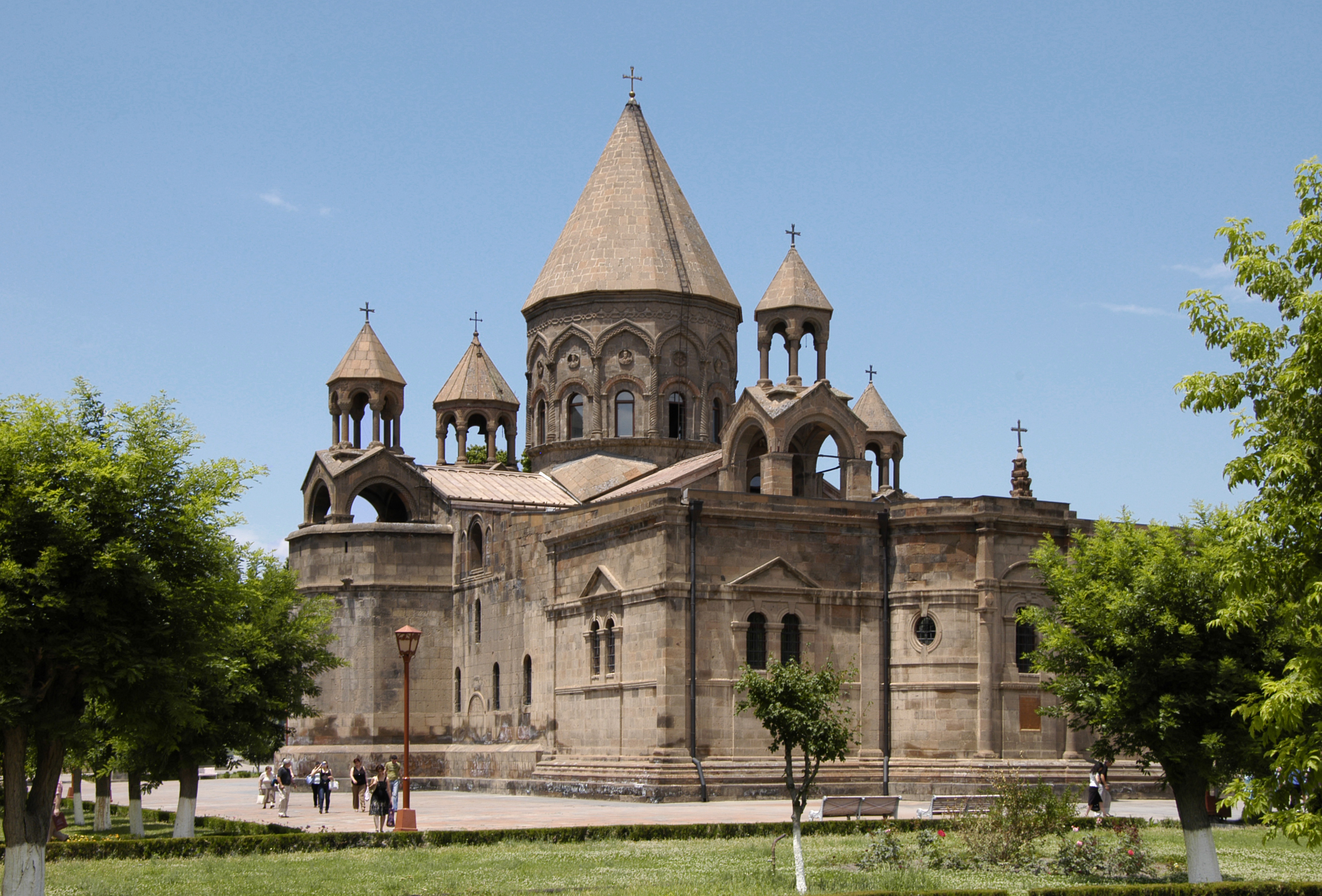
Etchmiadzin Cathedral in Armenia, considered the first cathedral, traditionally believed to be constructed in 301 AD (current structure mostly from 483 AD)

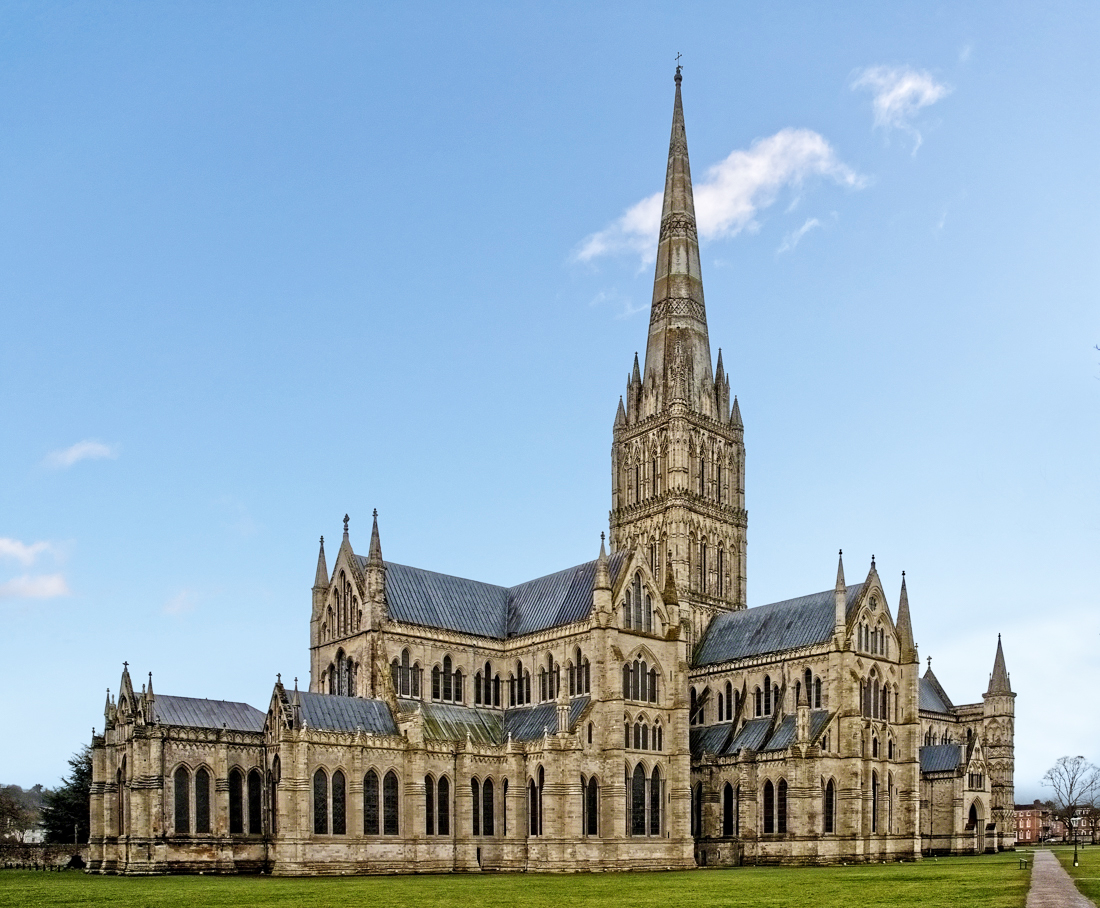
Salisbury Cathedral, 1220–1380; Early English Gothic, with the tallest spire in England

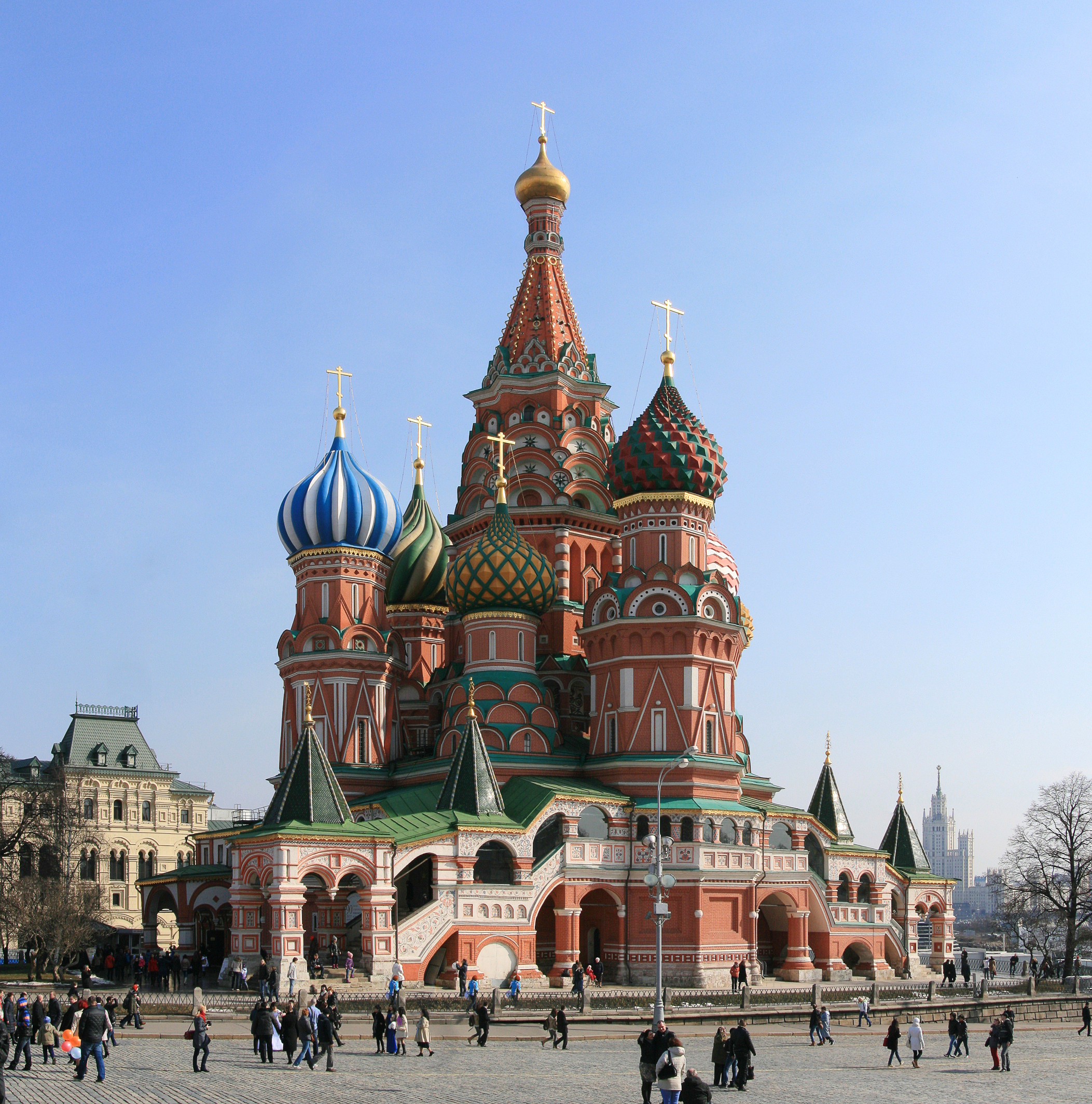
St. Basil's Cathedral, Moscow

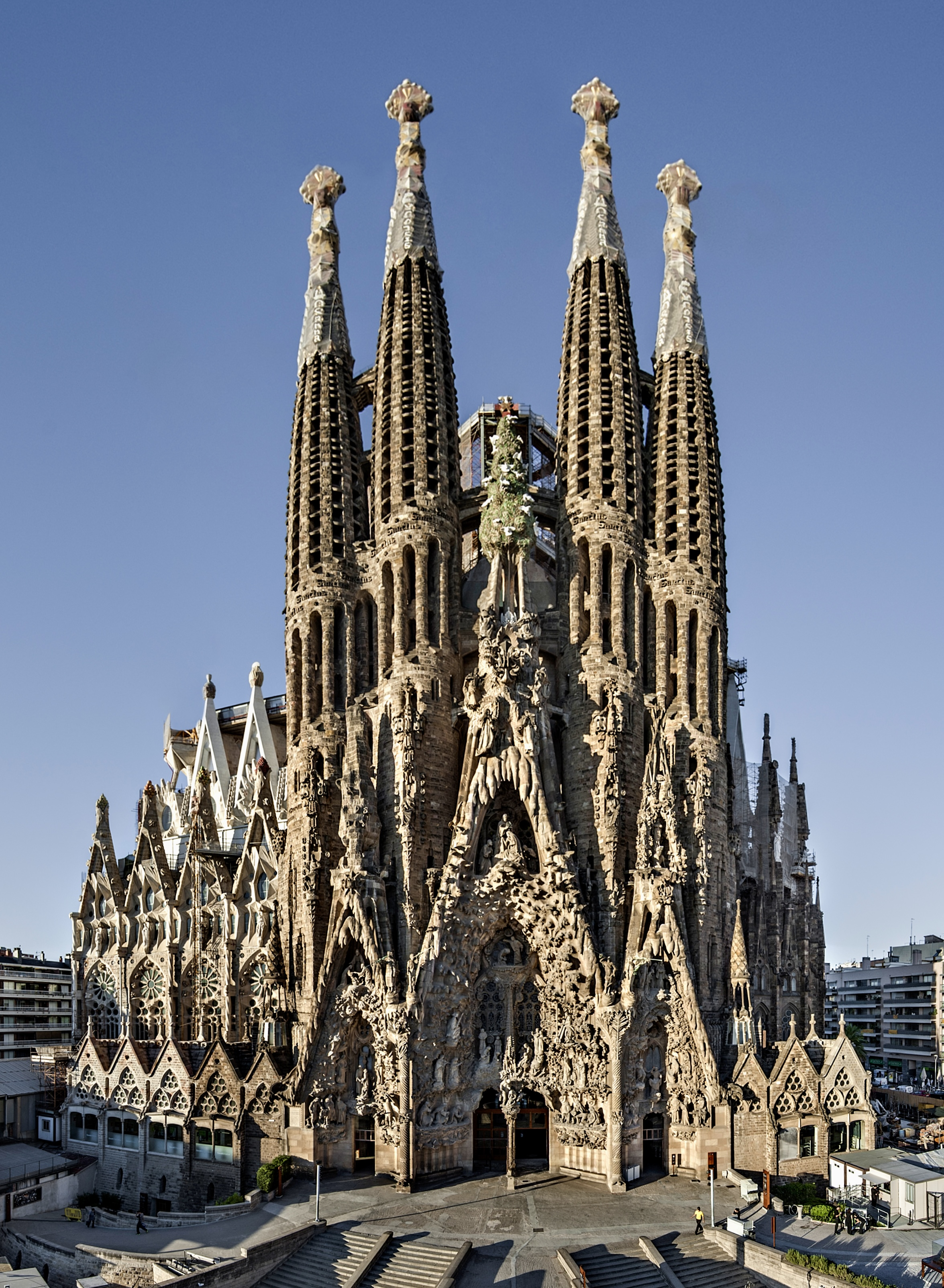
The architecturally unique Basilica of Sagrada Família in Barcelona combines structural elements of the traditional Gothic cathedral with a style drawing on Art Nouveau, local tradition and the imagination of its creator, Antoni Gaudí.

Cathedrals, collegiate churches, and monastic churches like those of abbeys and priories, often have certain complex structural forms that are found less often in parish churches. They also tend to display a higher level of contemporary architectural style and the work of accomplished craftsmen, and occupy a status, both ecclesiastical and social, that an ordinary parish church rarely has. Such churches are generally among the finest buildings locally and a source of regional pride. Many are among the world's most renowned works of architecture. These include St Peter's Basilica, Notre-Dame de Paris, Cologne Cathedral, Salisbury Cathedral, Antwerp Cathedral, Prague Cathedral, Lincoln Cathedral, the Basilica of Saint-Denis, Santa Maria Maggiore, the Basilica of San Vitale, St Mark's Basilica, Westminster Abbey, Saint Basil's Cathedral, Antoni Gaudí's incomplete Sagrada Família and the ancient cathedral of Hagia Sophia in Istanbul, now a mosque.

The earliest large churches date from Late Antiquity. As Christianity and the construction of churches spread across the world, their manner of building was dependent upon local materials and local techniques. Different styles of architecture developed and their fashion spread, carried by the establishment of monastic orders, by the posting of bishops from one region to another and by the travelling of master stonemasons who served as architects. The successive styles of the great church buildings of Europe are known as Early Christian, Byzantine, Romanesque, Gothic, Renaissance, Baroque, Rococo, Neoclassical, and various Revival styles of the late 18th to early 20th centuries, and then Modern. Underlying each of the academic styles are the regional characteristics. Some of these characteristics are so typical of a particular country or region that they appear, regardless of style, in the architecture of churches designed many centuries apart.

== Function ==
Among the world's largest and most architecturally significant churches, many were built to serve as cathedrals or abbey churches. The categories below are not exclusive. A church can be an abbey church and serve as a cathedral. Some Protestant parish churches like Ulm Minster have never served as any of these; since the Reformation many Western Christian denominations dispensed with the episcopate altogether and medieval churches lost, gained, or lost again their cathedral status, like St Giles', Edinburgh or St Magnus', Kirkwall. Some great churches of the Middle Ages, such as Westminster Abbey, are former abbeys; others like Ripon Cathedral and Bath Abbey were built as monastic churches and became cathedrals or parish churches in recent centuries; others again were built as parish churches and subsequently raised to cathedrals, like Southwark Cathedral. Some significant churches are termed "temples" or "oratories". Among the Roman Catholic churches, many have been raised to the status of "basilica" since the 18th century.

=== Cathedral ===
A cathedral has a specific ecclesiastical role and administrative purpose as the seat of a bishop. The cathedral (Latin: ecclesia cathedralis, lit. 'church of the cathedra') takes its name from the cathedra, 'seat' of the bishop, known as the episcopal throne. The word cathedral is sometimes mistakenly applied as a generic term for any very large and imposing church.

The role of bishop as an administrator of local clergy came into being in the 1st century. It was two hundred years before the first cathedral building was constructed in Rome. With the legalizing of Christianity in 313 by the Emperor Constantine I, churches were built rapidly. Five very large churches were founded in Rome and, though much altered or rebuilt, still exist today, including the cathedral church of Rome, St John on the Lateran Hill and the papal St Peter's Basilica on the Vatican Hill, now the Vatican City.

The architectural form which cathedrals took was largely dependent upon their ritual function as the seat of a bishop. Cathedrals are places where, in common with other Christian churches, the Eucharist is celebrated, the Bible is read, the liturgy is said or sung, prayers are offered and sermons are preached. But in a cathedral, among denominations with episcopalian church governance, these things are done with a greater amount of elaboration, pageantry and procession than in lesser churches. This elaboration is particularly present during important liturgical rites performed by a bishop, such as confirmation and ordination. In areas with a state religion or an established church a cathedral is often the site of rituals associated with local or national government, the bishops performing the tasks of all sorts from the induction of a mayor to the coronation of a monarch. Some of these tasks are apparent in the form and fittings of particular cathedrals.

Cathedrals are not always large buildings and there are no prerequisites in size, height, or capacity for cathedrals to serve as such beyond those required to be a typical church. A cathedral might be as small as the historic Newport Cathedral, a late medieval parish church declared a cathedral in 1949. That said, size, height, capacity, and architectural prominence are all categories in which most cathedrals excel (at least comparatively within the municipal context of each building).

There exist a number of practical reasons for this:

- The cathedral was created to the glory of God. It was seen as appropriate that it should be as grand and as beautiful as wealth and skill could make it.
- As the seat of a bishop, the cathedral was the location for certain liturgical rites, such as the ordination of priests, which brought together large numbers of clergy and people.
- It functioned as an ecclesiastical and social meeting-place for many people, not just those of the town in which it stood, but also, on occasions, for the entire region.
- The cathedral often had its origins in a monastic foundation and was a place of worship for members of a holy order who said the mass privately at a number of small chapels within the cathedral.
- The cathedral often became a place of worship and burial for wealthy local patrons. These patrons often endowed the cathedrals with money for successive enlargements and building programs.
- Cathedrals are also traditionally places of pilgrimage, to which people travel from afar to celebrate certain important feast days or to visit the shrine associated with a particular saint. An extended eastern end is often found at cathedrals where the remains of a saint are interred behind the High Altar.
Cathedrals

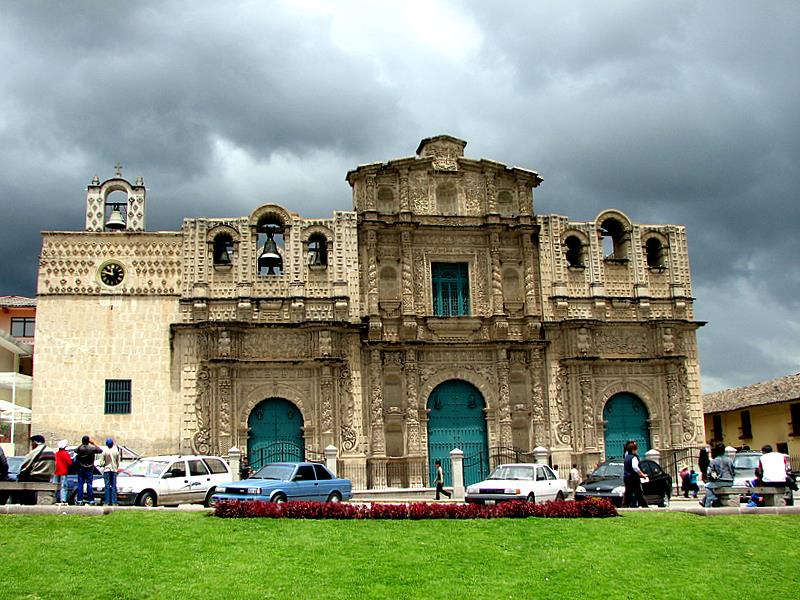
Cathedral of Cajamarca, Peru

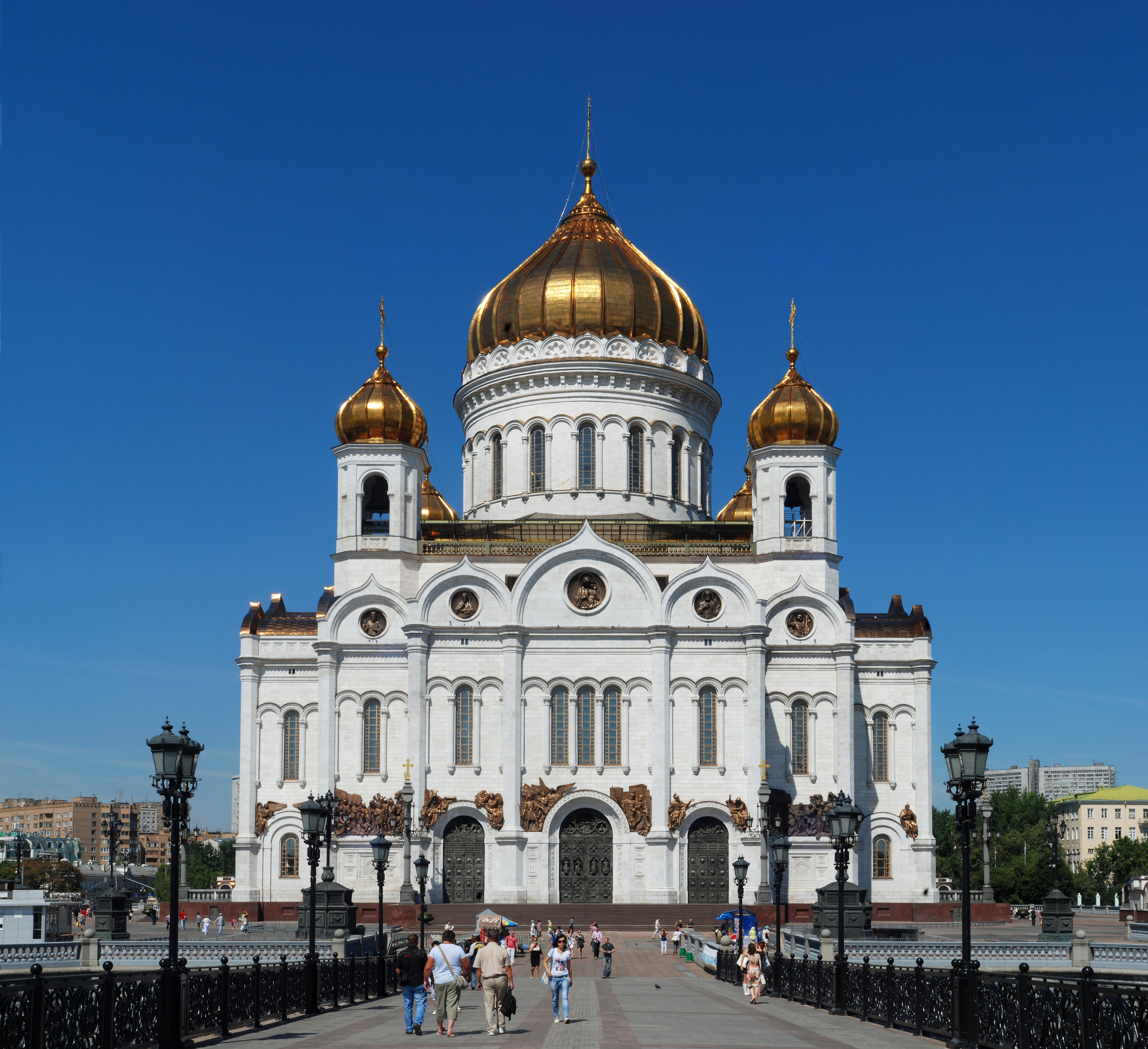
Cathedral of Christ the Saviour, Moscow, Russia

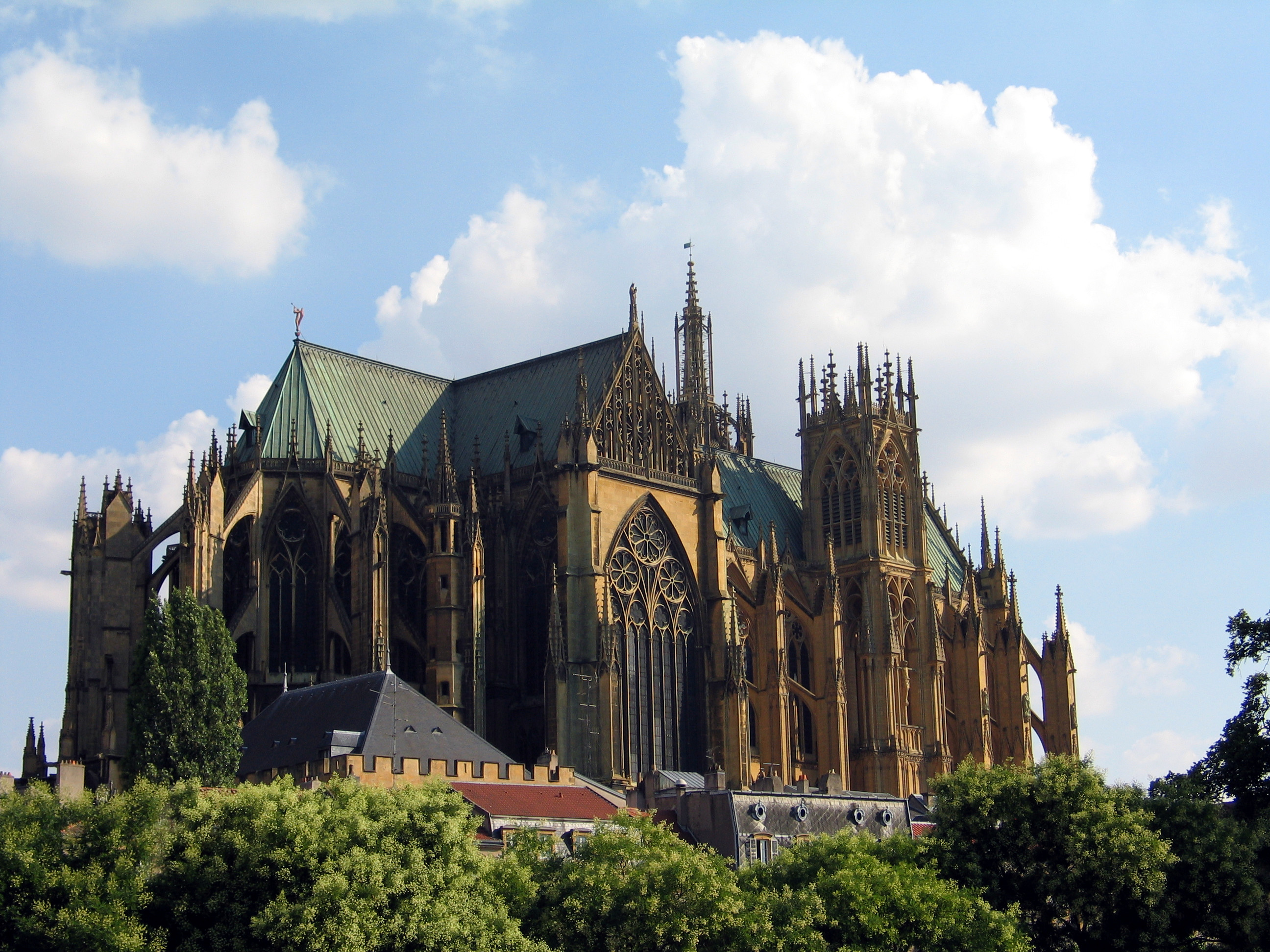
Saint-Stephen Cathedral, Metz, France

=== Monastic churches ===
An abbey church is one that is, or was in the past, the church of a monastic order. Likewise a friary church is the church of an order of friars. These orders include Benedictines, Cistercians, Augustinians, Franciscans, Dominicans, Jesuits and many more. Many churches of abbey foundation, are or previously were, part of a monastic complex that includes dormitories, refectory, cloisters, library, chapter house and other such buildings.

In many parts of the world, abbey churches frequently served the local community as well as the monastic community. In regions such as the British Isles where the monastic communities were dissolved, appropriated, secularized, or otherwise suppressed, the monastic churches often continued to serve as a parish church. In many areas of Asia and South America, the monasteries had the earliest established churches, with the monastic communities acting initially as missionaries to, and colonists of, indigenous people. Well-known abbey churches include Santa Maria delle Grazie, Milan, Italy; Westminster Abbey and Beverley Minster in England, the Abbey of Saint-Étienne, Caen and Abbey of St-Denis in France, Melk Abbey in Austria, Great Lavra on Mt Athos, and the Malate Church in Manila.

Abbeys

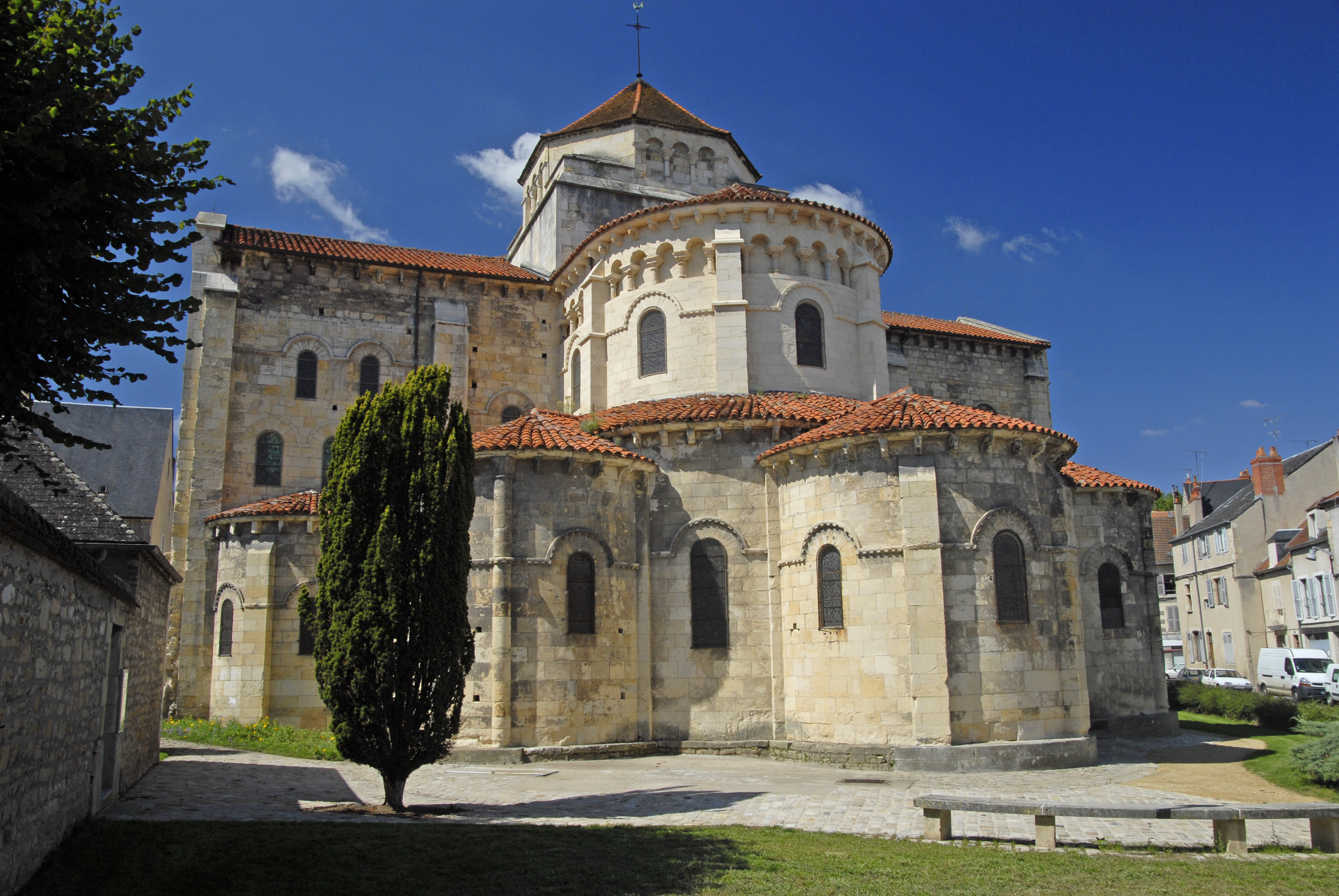
The Romanesque Abbey Church of St Etienne, Nevers, France

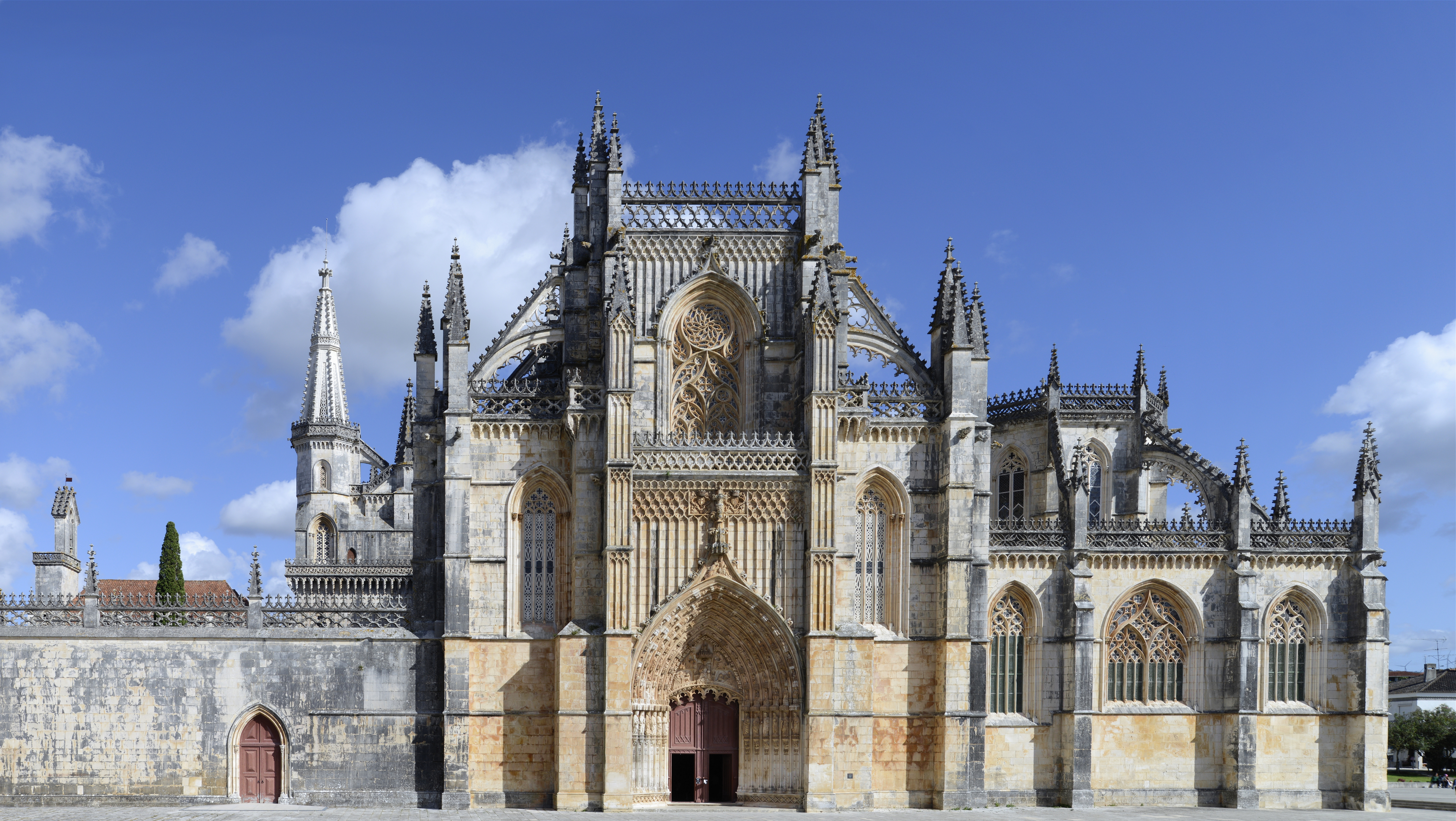
The Gothic Abbey Church of Batalha Monastery, Portugal

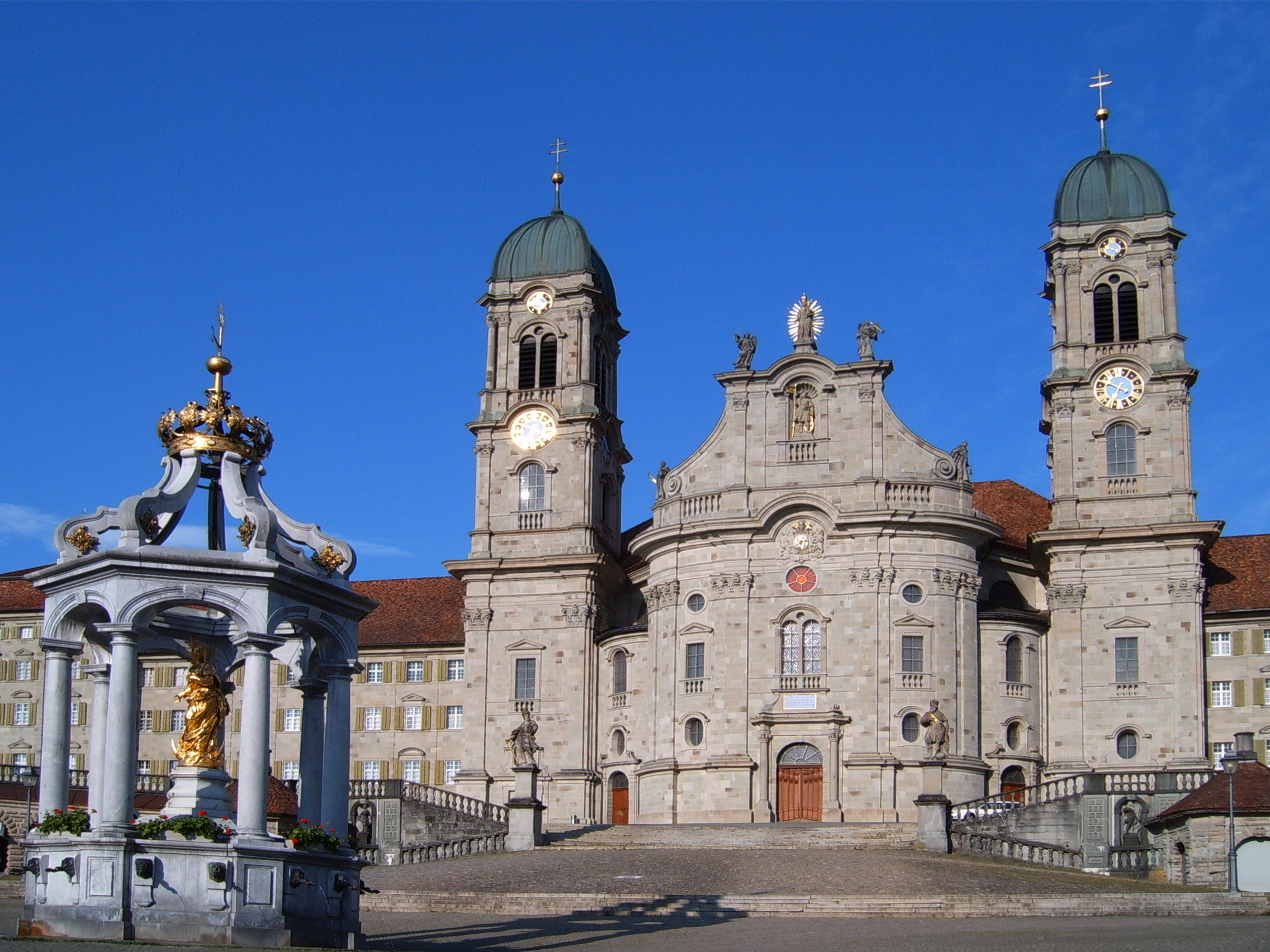
The Baroque Einsiedeln Abbey at Einsiedeln, Switzerland

=== Basilica ===
The meaning of "basilica" in architecture is discussed below; in the Roman Catholic ecclesiastical sense, a "basilica" is a title awarded by the pope, head of the Catholic Church, and recipient churches are accordingly afforded certain privileges. A building that is designated as a basilica might be a cathedral, a collegiate or monastic church, a parish church, or a shrine. The four so-called "Major Basilicas" are four churches of Rome of 4th century foundation, St John Lateran, Santa Maria Maggiore, St Peter's Basilica, and the Basilica of Saint Paul Outside the Walls. There are 1,810 as of 2019 churches in the world which are designated as "Minor Basilicas". The reason for such a designation is often that the church is a prominent pilgrimage site and contains the celebrated relics of a saint, or another relic, such as a supposed fragment of the True Cross. These churches are often large and of considerable architectural significance. They include the Basilica of St Francis, Assisi; the Church of the Nativity, Bethlehem; Santhome Church, Chennai; the Sanctuary of Fátima, Portugal; Sheshan Basilica, Shanghai, the Basilica of the Immaculate Conception in Manila, and the Basilica of Our Lady of Guadalupe in Mexico City.

Basilicas

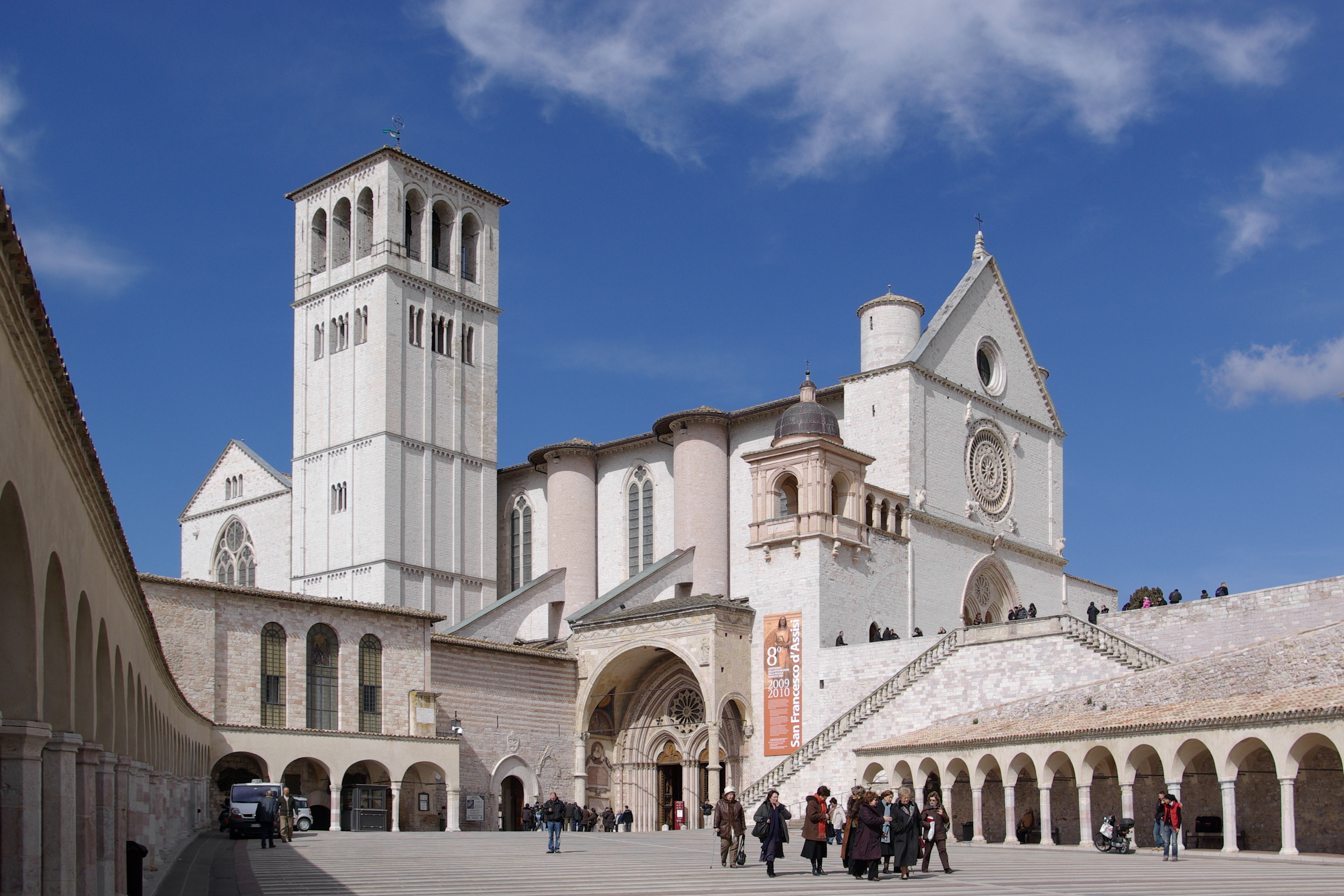
Basilica of Saint Francis of Assisi, Assisi, Italy

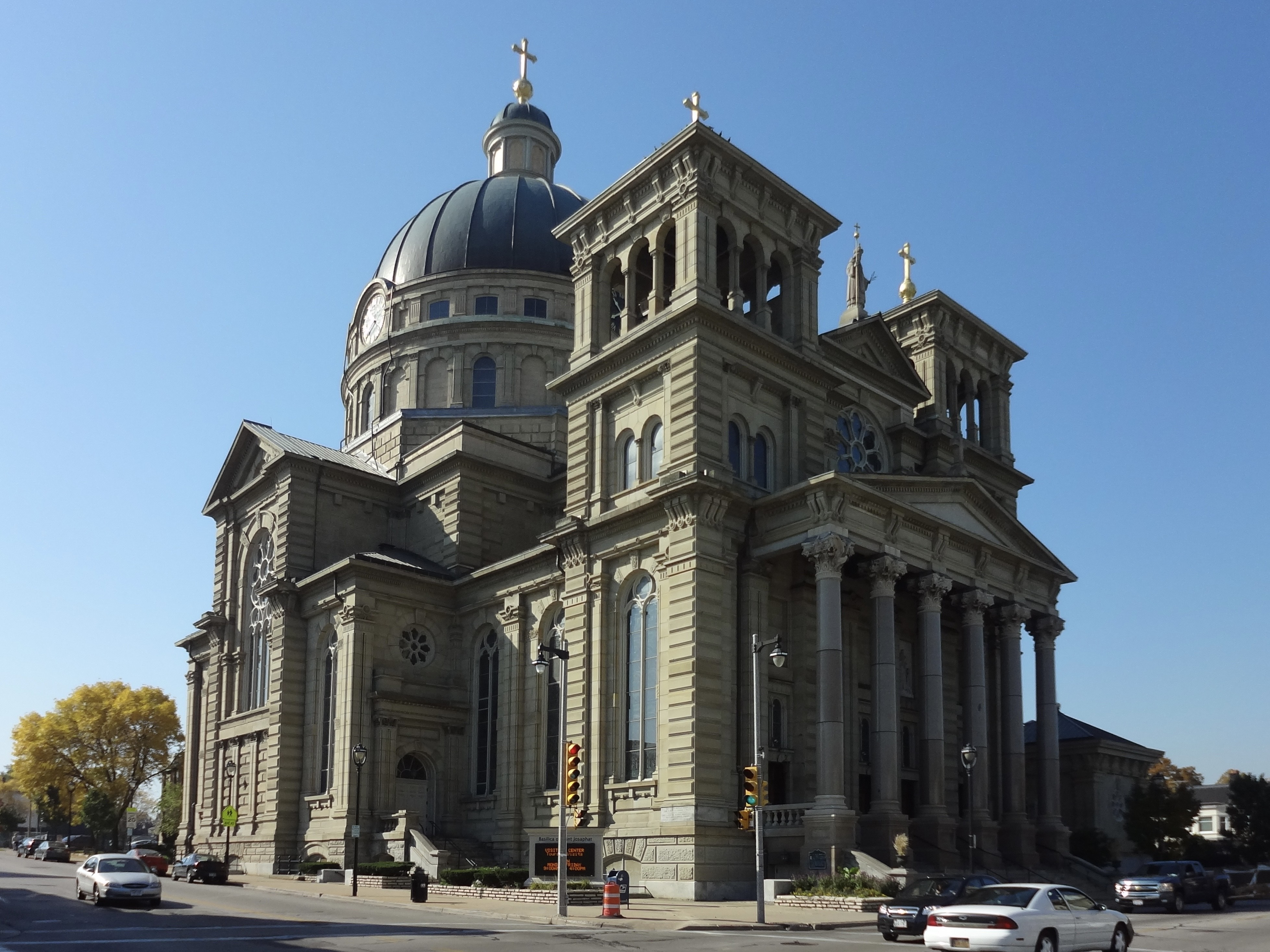
Basilica of St Josaphat, Milwaukee, United States

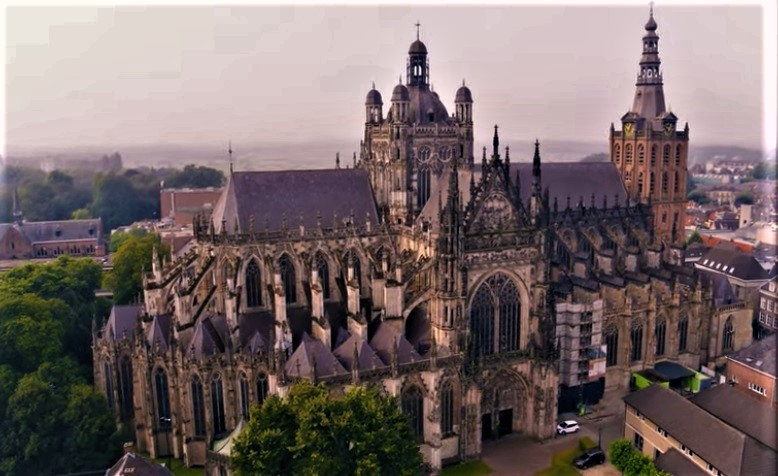
St. John's Cathedral ('s-Hertogenbosch), 's-Hertogenbosch, the Netherlands

== Origins and development of the church building ==
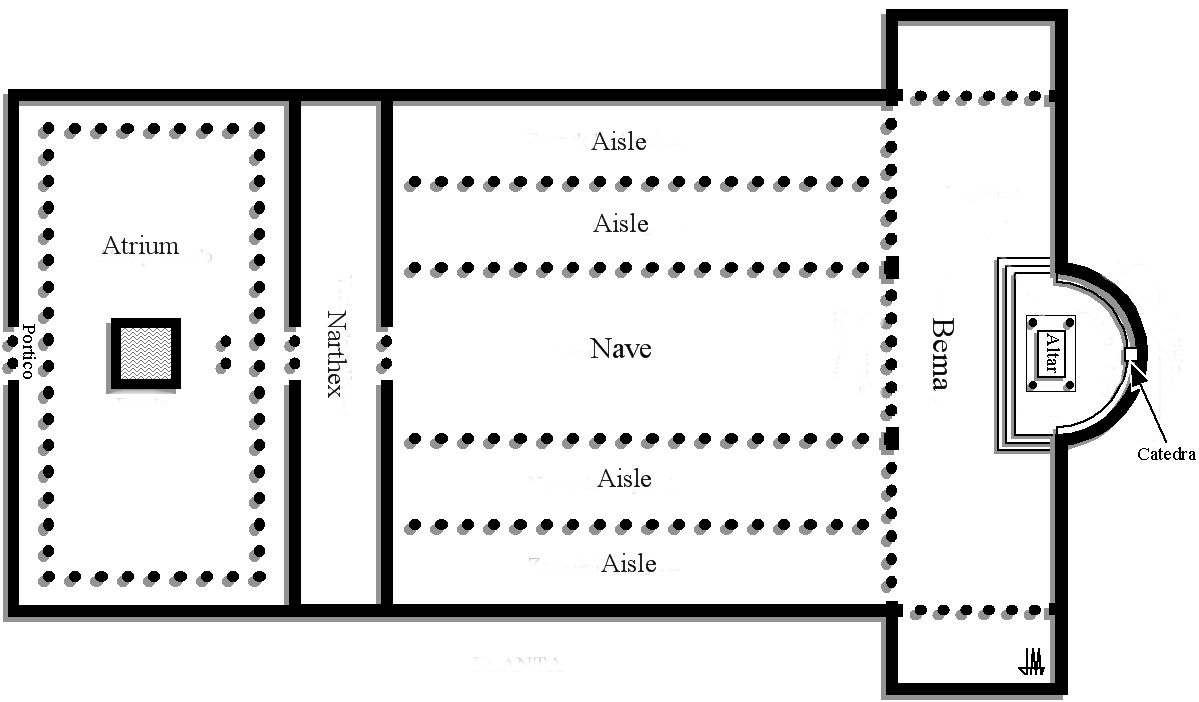
Plan of Old St Peter's Basilica, showing atrium (courtyard), narthex (vestibule), central nave with double aisles, a bema for the clergy extending into a transept, and an exedra or semi-circular apse.

The church building grew out of a number of features of the Ancient Roman period:

- The house church
- The atrium
- The basilica
- The bema
- The mausoleum – centrally planned building
- The cruciform ground plan – Latin or Greek cross

=== From house church to church ===
From the first to the early fourth centuries most Christian communities worshipped in private homes, often secretly. Some Roman churches, such as the Basilica of San Clemente in Rome, are built directly over the houses where early Christians worshipped. Other early Roman churches are built on the sites of Christian martyrdom or at the entrance to catacombs where Christians were buried. The first very large Christian churches were built in Rome and have their origins in the early 4th century, when with Edict of Milan the emperors Constantine and Licinius continued the legalization of Christianity begun by their predecessor Galerius's Edict of Serdica. Several of Rome's largest churches, notably Santa Maria Maggiore and St John Lateran, have their foundation in the 4th century. The cathedral church of Rome is St John Lateran and not the more famous St Peter's Basilica. St Peter's is also of 4th century foundation, though nothing of that appears above the ground.

=== Atrium ===
When Early Christian Communities began to build churches they drew on one particular feature of the houses that preceded them, the atrium, or courtyard with a colonnade surrounding it. Most of these atriums have disappeared. A fine example remains at the Basilica of San Clemente in Rome and another was built in the Romanesque period at Sant'Ambrogio, Milan. The descendants of these atria may be seen in the large square cloisters that can be found beside many cathedrals, and in the huge colonnaded squares or piazze at the Basilicas of St Peter's in Rome and St Mark's in Venice and the Camposanto (Holy Field) at Pisa Cathedral.

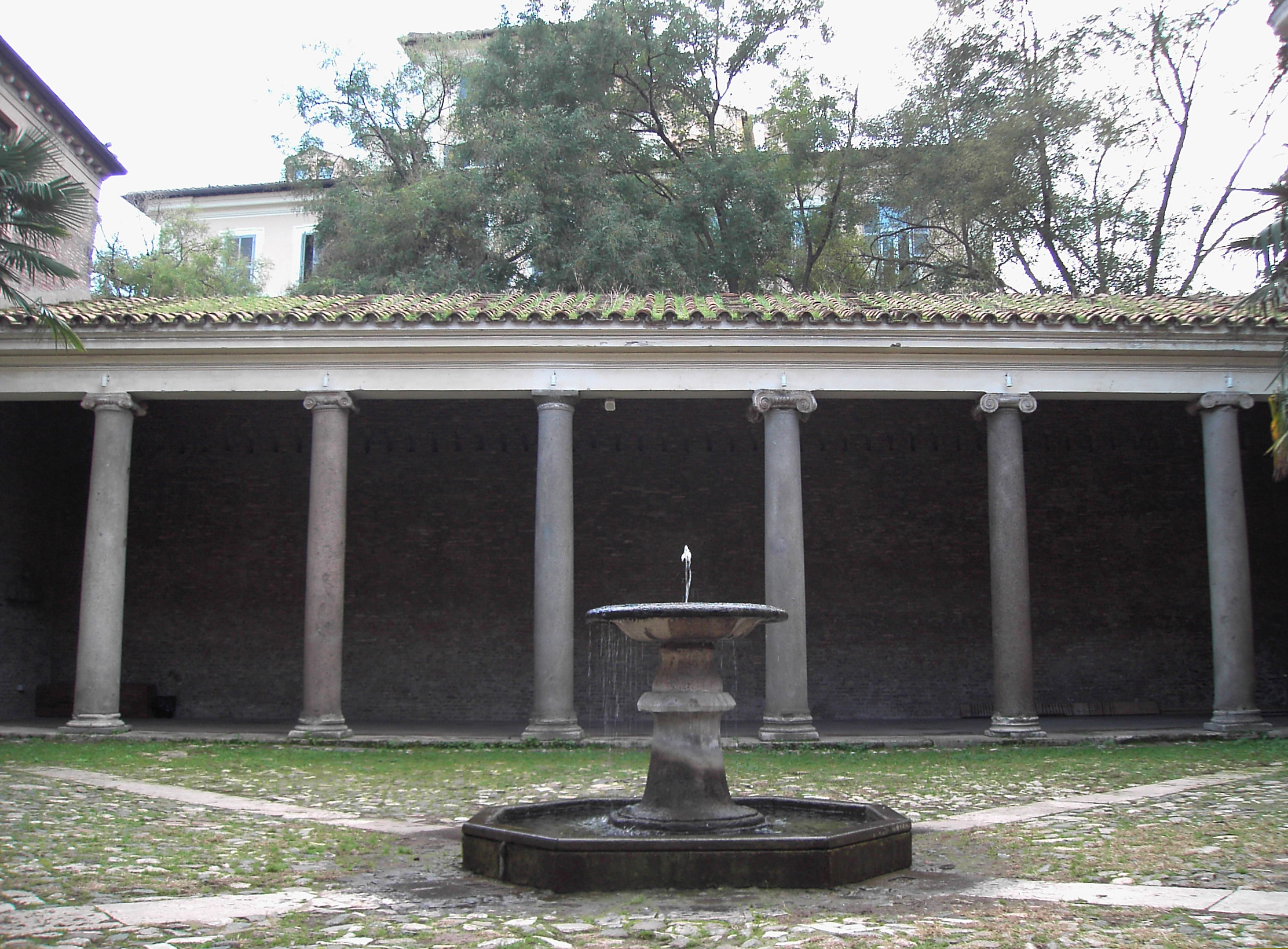
The atrium at the Basilica di San Clemente, Rome, with reused Ancient Roman columns

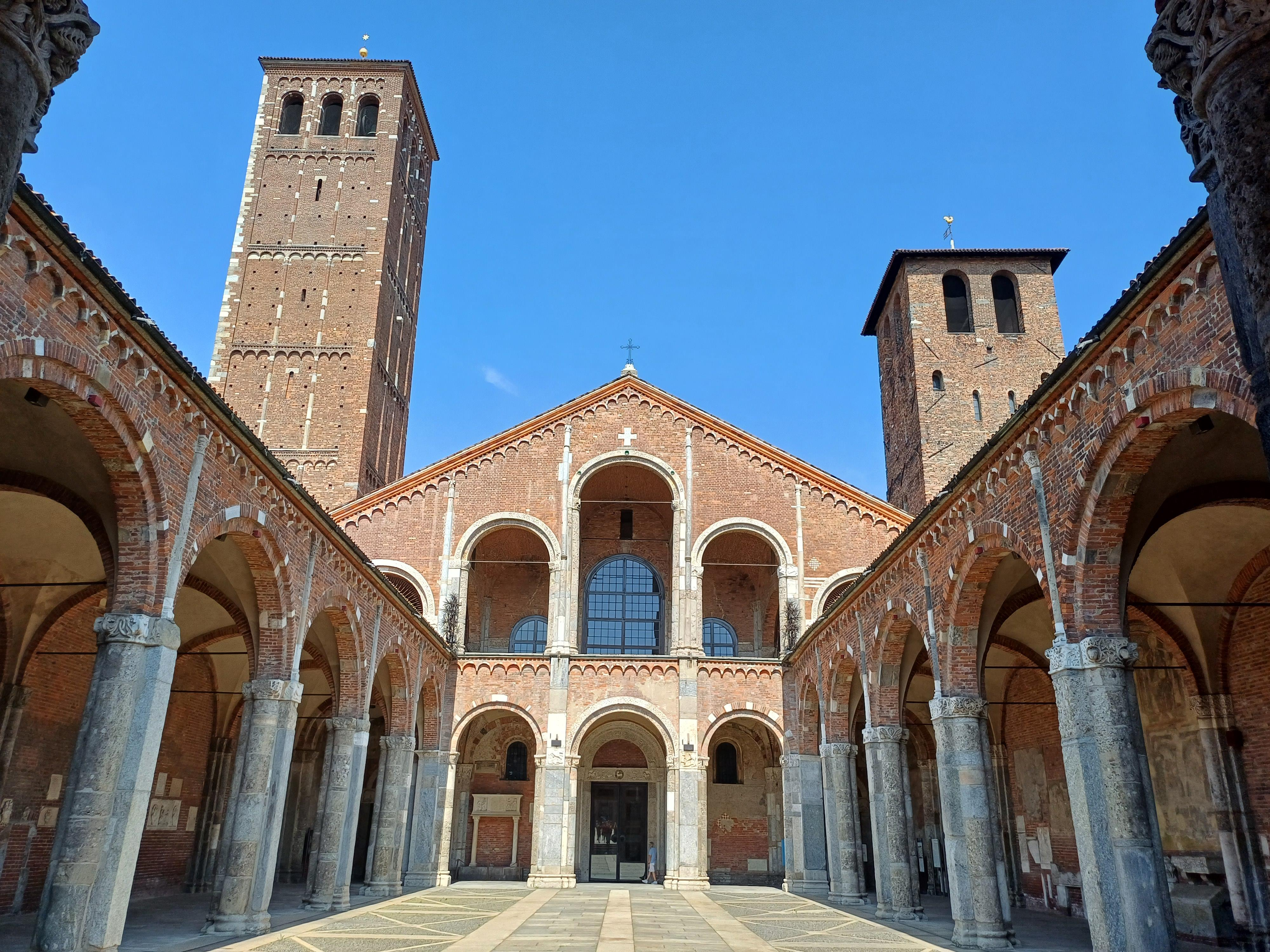
The Romanesque atrium at the Basilica of Sant'Ambrogio, Milan

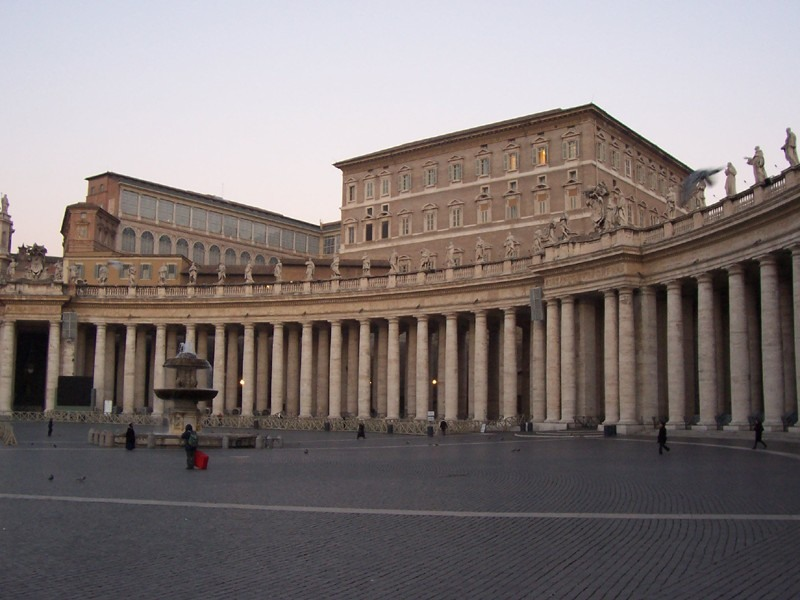
A section of the enormous colonnade around the piazza of St Peter's Basilica, Rome

=== Basilica ===
Early church architecture did not draw its form from Roman temples, as the latter did not have large internal spaces where worshipping congregations could meet. It was the Roman basilica, used for meetings, markets and courts of law that provided a model for the large Christian church and that gave its name to the Christian basilica. Both Roman basilicas and Roman bath houses had at their core a large vaulted building with a high roof, braced on either side by a series of lower chambers or a wide arcade passage. An important feature of the Roman basilica was that at either end it had a projecting exedra, or apse, a semicircular space roofed with a half-dome. This was where the magistrates sat to hold court. It passed into the church architecture of the Roman world and was adapted in different ways as a feature of cathedral architecture.

The earliest large churches, such as the cathedral of St John Lateran in Rome, consisted of a single-ended basilica with one apsidal end and a courtyard, or atrium, at the other end. As Christian liturgy developed, processions became part of the proceedings. The processional door was that which led from the furthest end of the building, while the door most used by the public might be that central to one side of the building, as in a basilica of law. This is the case in many cathedrals and churches.

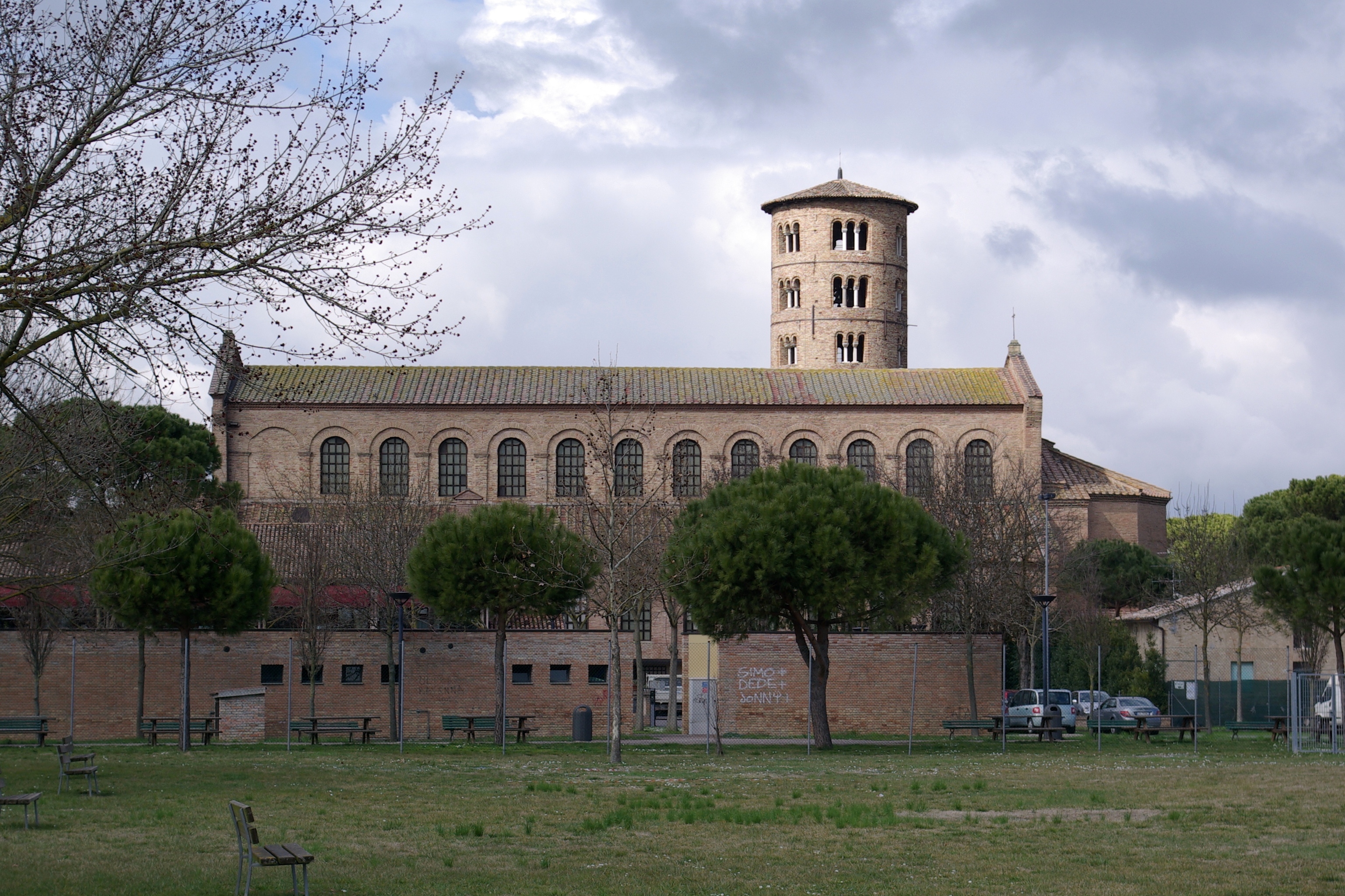
The Ancient Basilica of Sant'Apollinare in Classe, near Ravenna, Italy

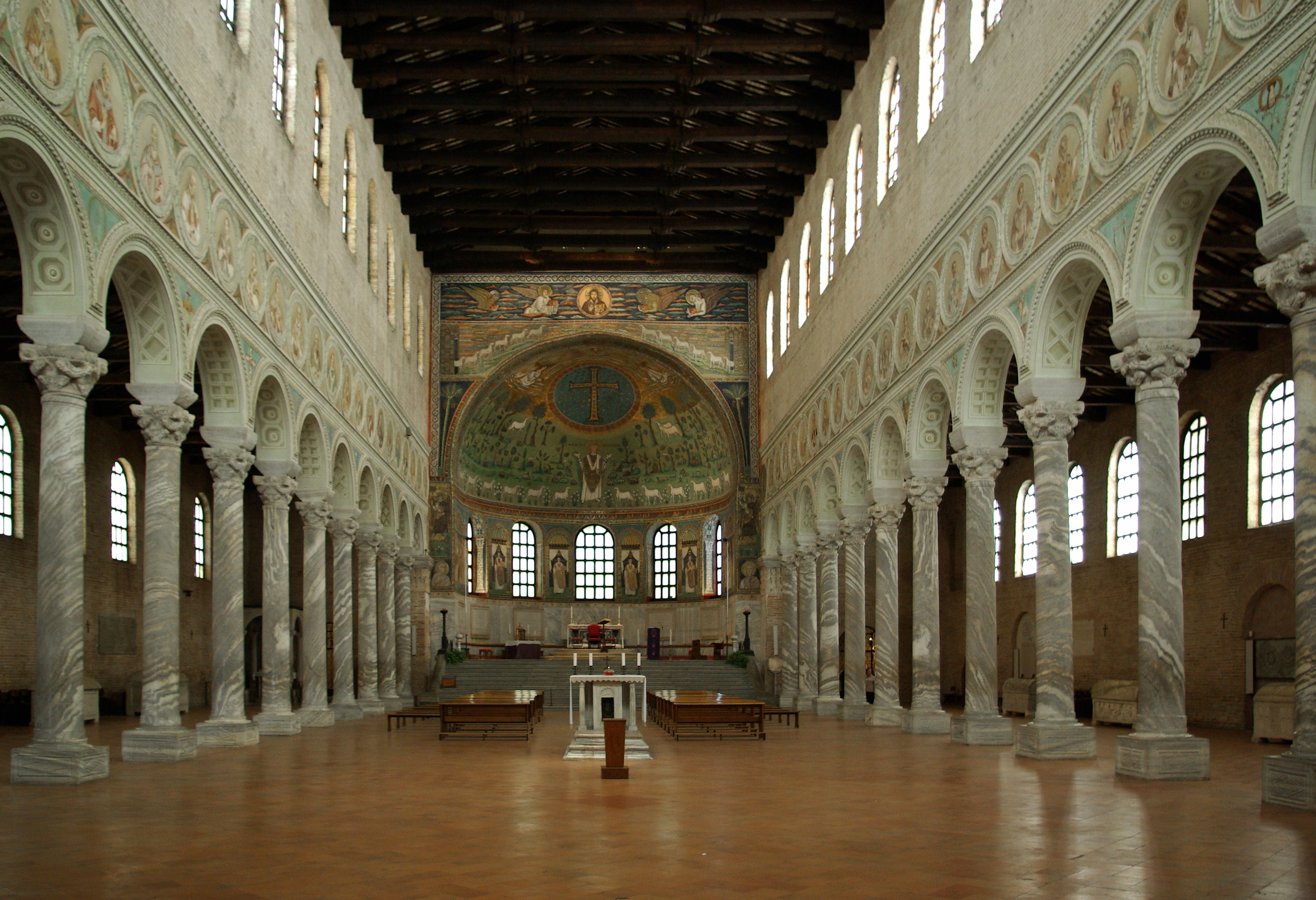
The interior of Sant'Apollinare in Classe

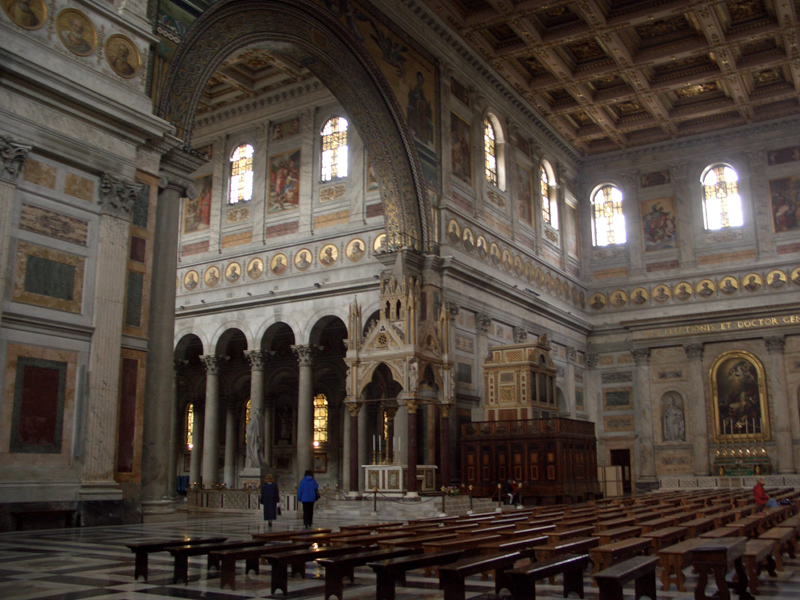
The "bema" of the Basilica of Saint Paul Outside the Walls, Rome

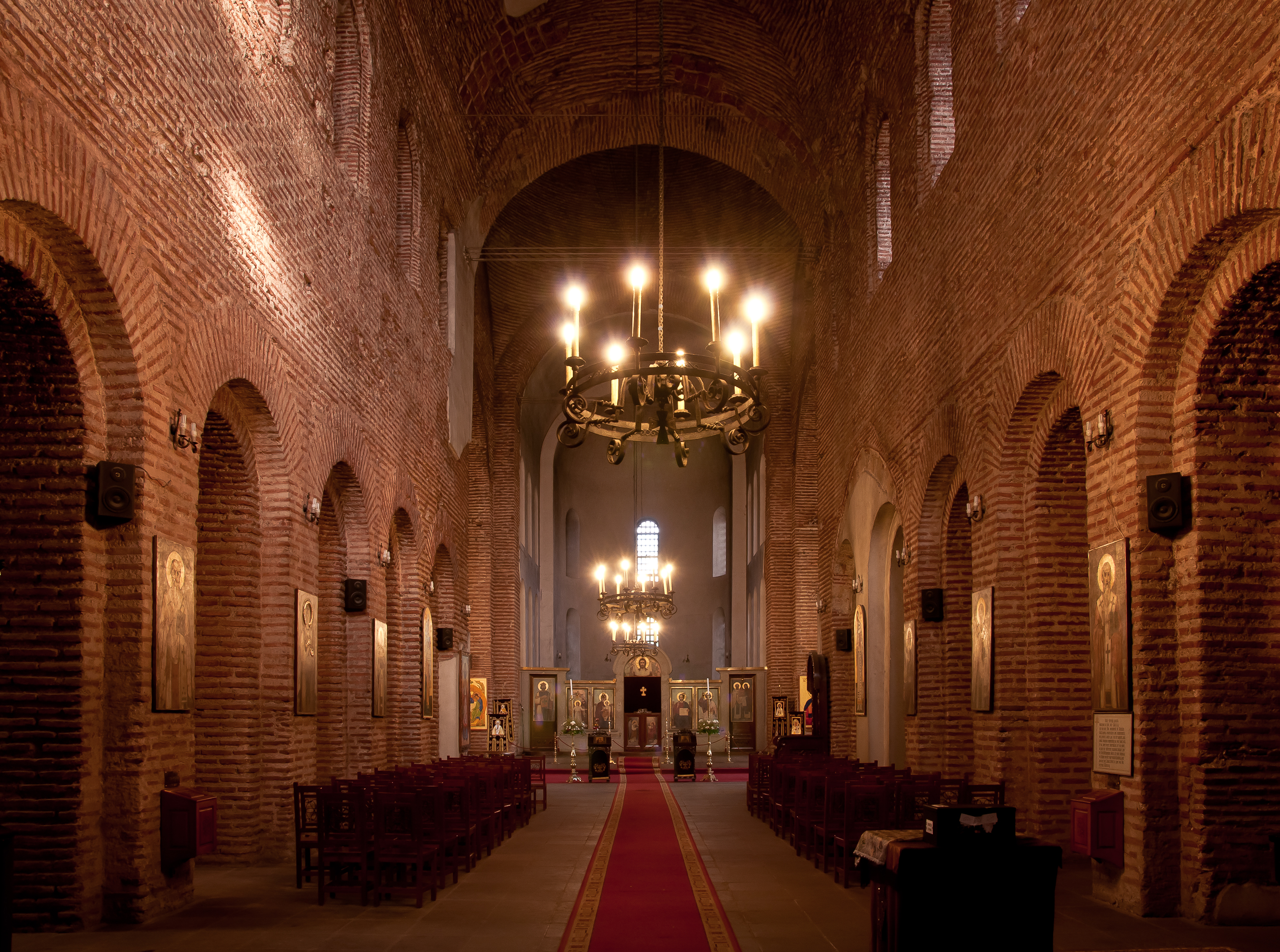
The nave of Basílica of Saint Sofia, Sofia

=== Mausoleum ===
One of the influences on church architecture was the mausoleum. The mausoleum of a noble Roman was a square or circular domed structure which housed a sarcophagus. Constantine the Great built for his daughter Constantina a mausoleum which has a circular central space surrounded by a lower ambulatory or passageway separated by a colonnade.

This burial place became a place of worship, Santa Costanza, as well as a tomb. It is one of the earliest church buildings that was centrally, rather than longitudinally planned. Constantine was also responsible for the building of the circular, mausoleum-like Church of the Holy Sepulchre in Jerusalem, which in turn influenced the plan of a number of buildings, including that constructed in Rome to house the remains of the proto-martyr Saint Stephen, San Stefano Rotondo and the Basilica of San Vitale in Ravenna.

Ancient circular or polygonal churches are comparatively rare. A small number, such as the Temple Church, London were built during the Crusades in imitation of the Church of the Holy Sepulchre as isolated examples in England, France and Spain. In Denmark such churches in the Romanesque style are much more numerous. In parts of Europe there are also round tower-like churches of the Romanesque period but they are generally vernacular architecture and of small scale. Others, like Rotunda of St Martin at Vyšehrad in the Czech Republic are finely detailed.

The circular or polygonal form lent itself to those buildings within church complexes that perform a function in which it is desirable for people to stand, or sit around, with a centralised focus, rather than an axial one. In Italy the circular or polygonal form was used throughout the medieval period for baptisteries, while in England it was adapted for chapter houses. In France the aisled polygonal plan was adapted as the eastern terminal and in Spain the same form is often used as a chapel.

Other than Santa Costanza and San Stefano, there was another significant place of worship in Rome that was also circular, the vast Ancient Roman Pantheon, with its numerous statue-filled niches. This too was to become a church and subsequently a Roman Catholic basilica and lend its style to the development of ecclesiastical architecture.

Circular churches

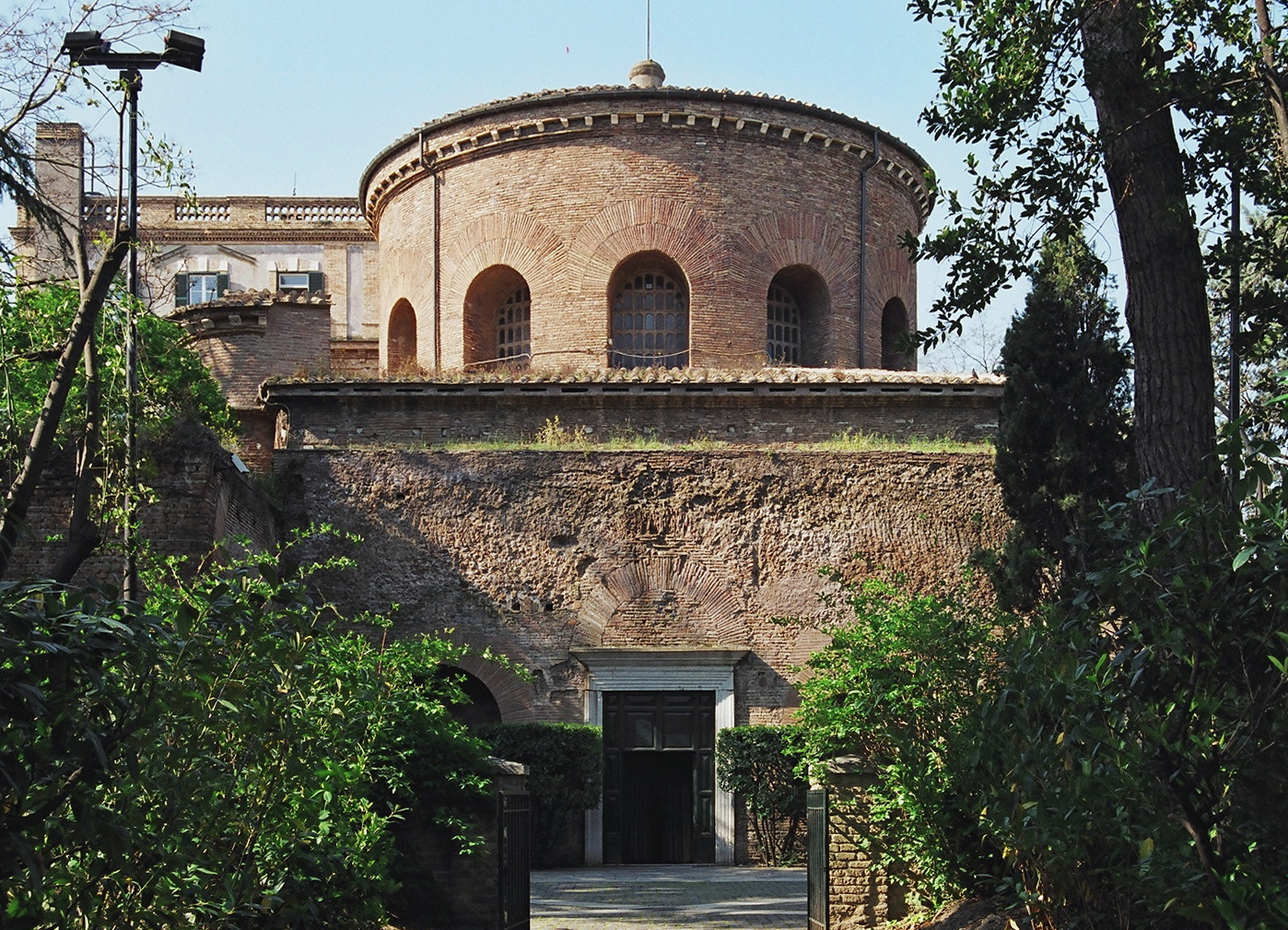
The Mausoleum of Santa Costanza, Rome, was built as the tomb of the augusta Constantina. (See interior below.)

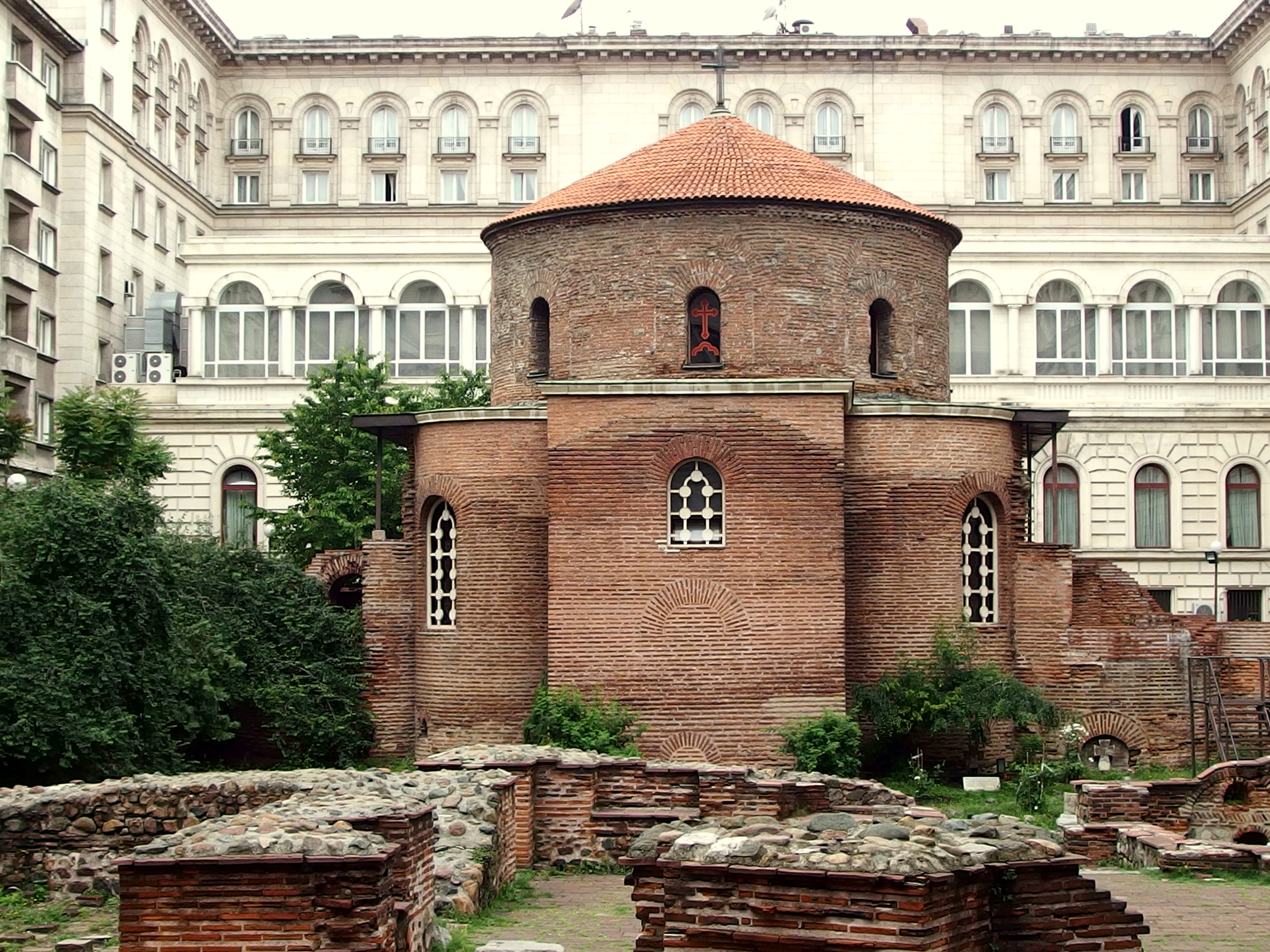
Church of Saint George, Sofia, Bulgaria, built during the 4th century in the Roman city of Serdica.

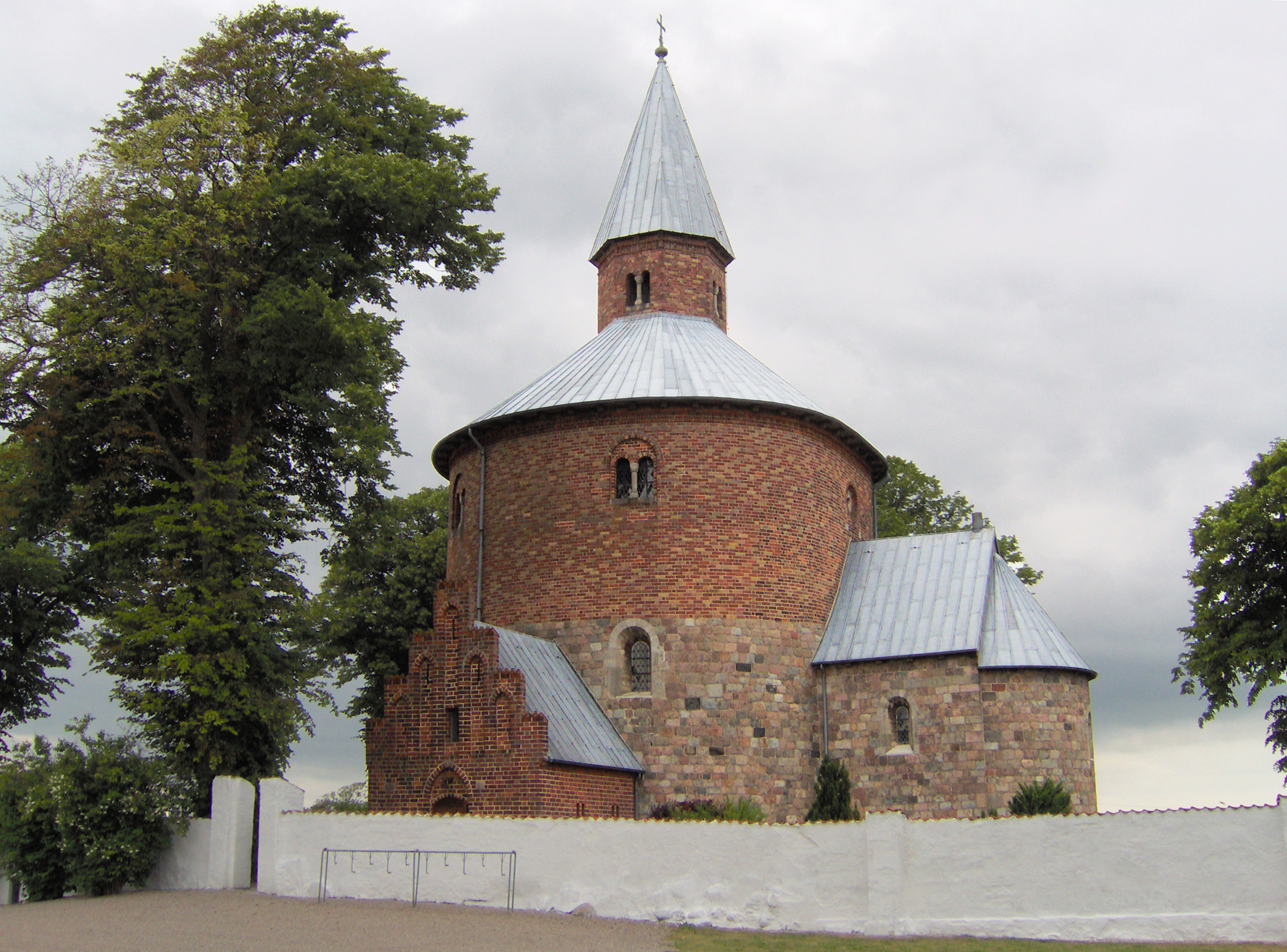
Bjernede Kirke is one of several circular Romanesque churches in Denmark.

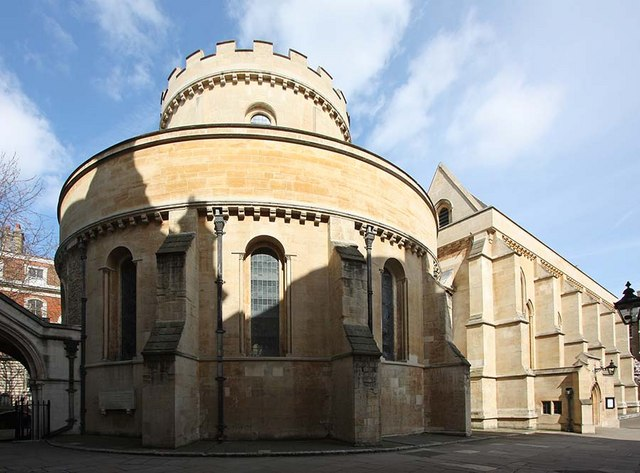
Temple Church, London was inspired by the rotunda of the Church of the Holy Sepulchre, Jerusalem and built by the Knights Templar.

=== Bema ===
As numbers of clergy increased, the small apse which contained the altar, or table upon which the sacramental bread and wine were offered in the rite of Holy Communion, was not sufficient to accommodate them. A raised dais called a bema formed part of many large basilican churches. In the case of St Peter's Basilica and St Paul's Outside the Walls in Rome, this bema extended laterally beyond the main meeting hall, forming two arms so that the building took on the shape of a T with a projecting apse. From this beginning, the plan of the church developed into the so-called Latin Cross which is the shape of most Western Cathedrals and large churches. The arms of the cross are called the transept.

=== Latin Cross and Greek Cross ===
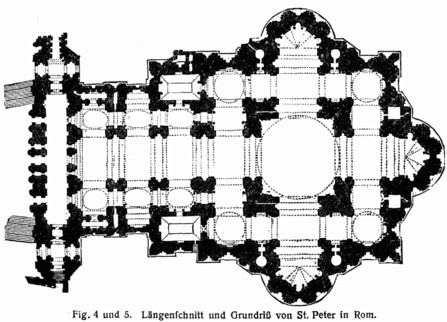
Plan of the Renaissance St Peter's Basilica, showing elements of both central and longitudinal plan.

Many of the earliest churches of Byzantium have a longitudinal plan. At Hagia Sophia, Istanbul, there is a central dome, framed on one axis by two high semi-domes and on the other by low rectangular transept arms, the overall plan being square. This large church was to influence the building of many later churches, even into the 21st century. A square plan in which the nave, chancel and transept arms are of equal length forming a Greek cross, the crossing generally surmounted by a dome became the common form in the Orthodox Church, with many churches throughout Eastern Europe and Russia being built in this way. Churches of the Greek Cross form often have a narthex or vestibule which stretches across the front of the church. This type of plan was also to later play a part in the development of church architecture in Western Europe, most notably in Bramante's plan for St Peter's Basilica and Christopher Wren's design for St Paul's Cathedral.

Most cathedrals and great churches have a cruciform groundplan. In churches of Western European tradition, the plan is usually longitudinal, in the form of the so-called Latin Cross with a long nave crossed by a transept. The transept may be as strongly projecting as at York Minster or not project beyond the aisles as at Amiens Cathedral.

== Architecture ==
A schematic plan showing the elements and orientation that are common to many churches

=== Architectural forms common to many cathedrals and great churches ===
Note- The list below is compiled from Banister Fletcher. Because of the diversity in the individual building histories, not all the characteristics pertain to every building.

==== Axis ====
As described above, the majority of cathedrals and great churches are cruciform in shape with the church having a defined axis. The axis is generally east/west with external emphasis upon the west front, normally the main entrance, and internal emphasis upon the eastern end so that the congregation faces the direction of the coming of Christ. As it is also in the direction of the rising sun, the architectural features of the east end often focus on enhancing interior illumination by the sun. Not every church or cathedral maintains a strict east–west axis, but even in those that do not, the terms East End and West Front are used. Many churches of Rome, notably St Peter's Basilica, face the opposite direction.

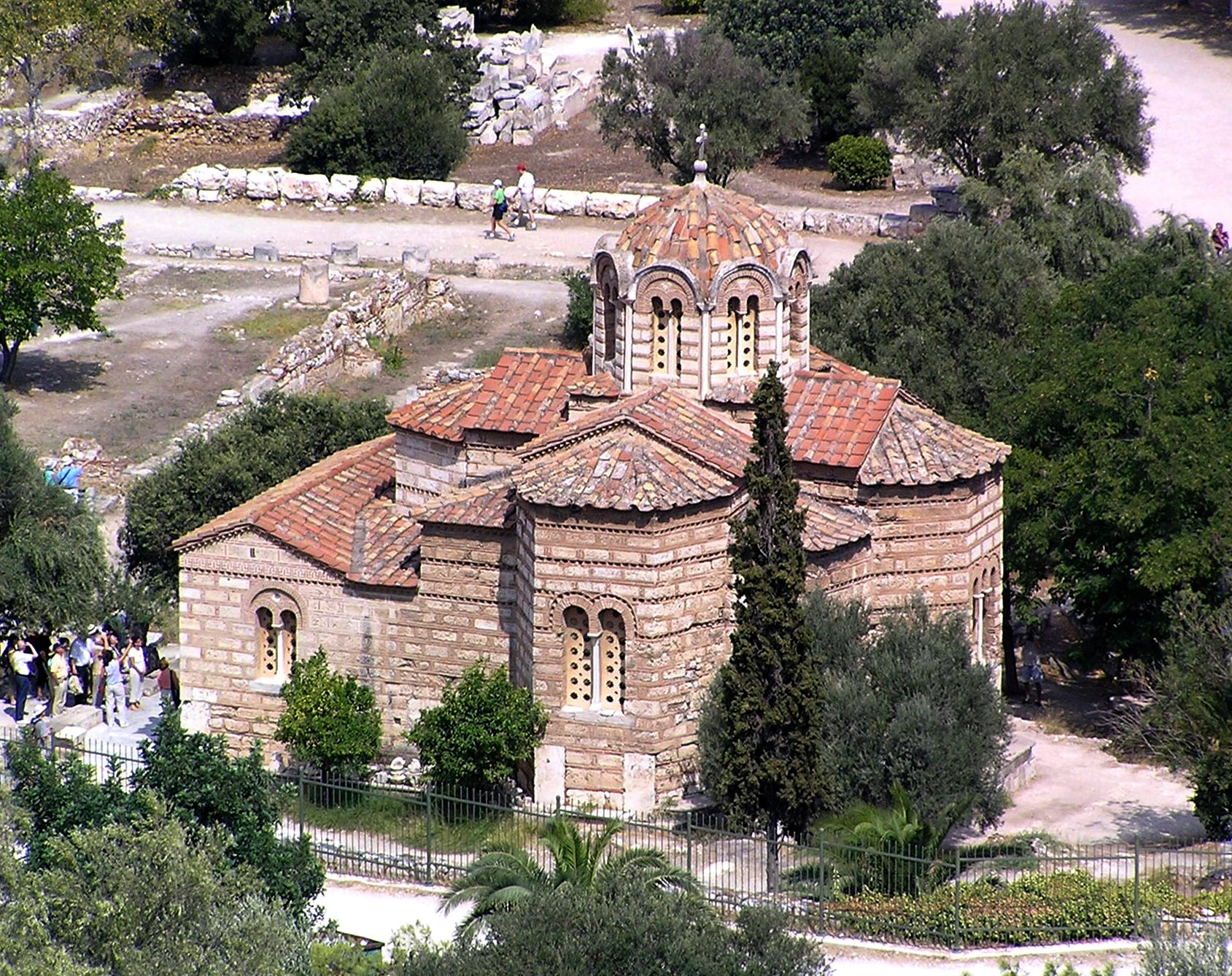
The Byzantine Church of the Holy Apostles, Athens, shows a Greek Cross plan with central dome and the axis marked by the narthex (transverse vestibule).

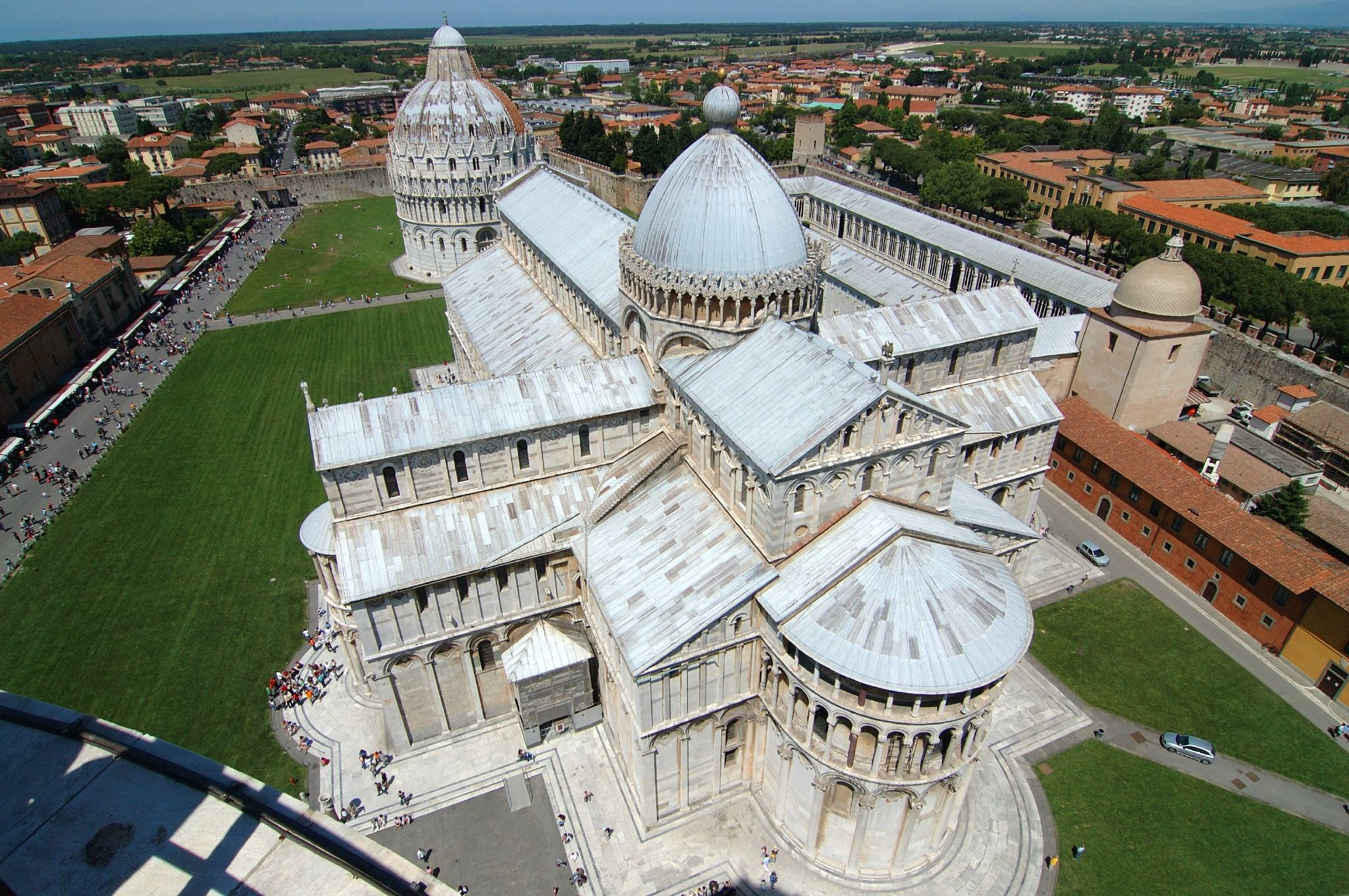
Pisa Cathedral from the "Leaning Tower" shows the Latin Cross form, with projecting apse, foreground, and free-standing baptistry at the west.

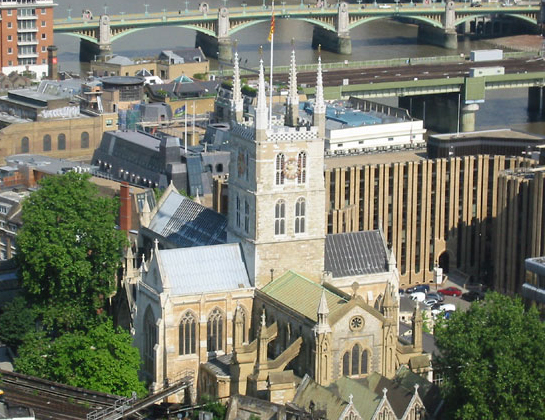
Southwark Cathedral, London, shows strongly projecting transepts, long eastern end and the central tower common in Britain.

==== Nave ====
The majority of cathedrals and large churches of the Western European tradition have a high wide nave with a lower aisle separated by an arcade on either side. Occasionally the aisles are as high as the nave, forming a hall church; this is mostly a German type. Many cathedrals have two aisles on either side. Notre-Dame de Paris has two aisles and a row of chapels.

In the case of a centrally planned church, the major axis is that between the main door and the altar.

==== Transept ====
The transept forms the arms of the church building. In English cathedrals of monastic foundation there are often two transepts. The intersection where the nave and transept meet is called the crossing and is often surmounted by a small spire called a flèche, a dome or, particularly in England, a large tower with or without a spire.

==== Vertical emphasis ====
There is generally a prominent external feature that rises upwards. It may be a dome, a central tower, two western towers or towers at both ends as at Speyer Cathedral. The towers are often topped by a spire. Often towers rise above the main entrance at the west front, or they may be placed centrally, or at the east end, but spires were unusual at the west end before James Gibbs's innovative and much-copied St Martin-in-the-Fields, London, in the 1720s. The towers may be finished with pinnacles or spires or a small dome.

Three ancient cathedrals dominating townscapes which have retained medieval scale

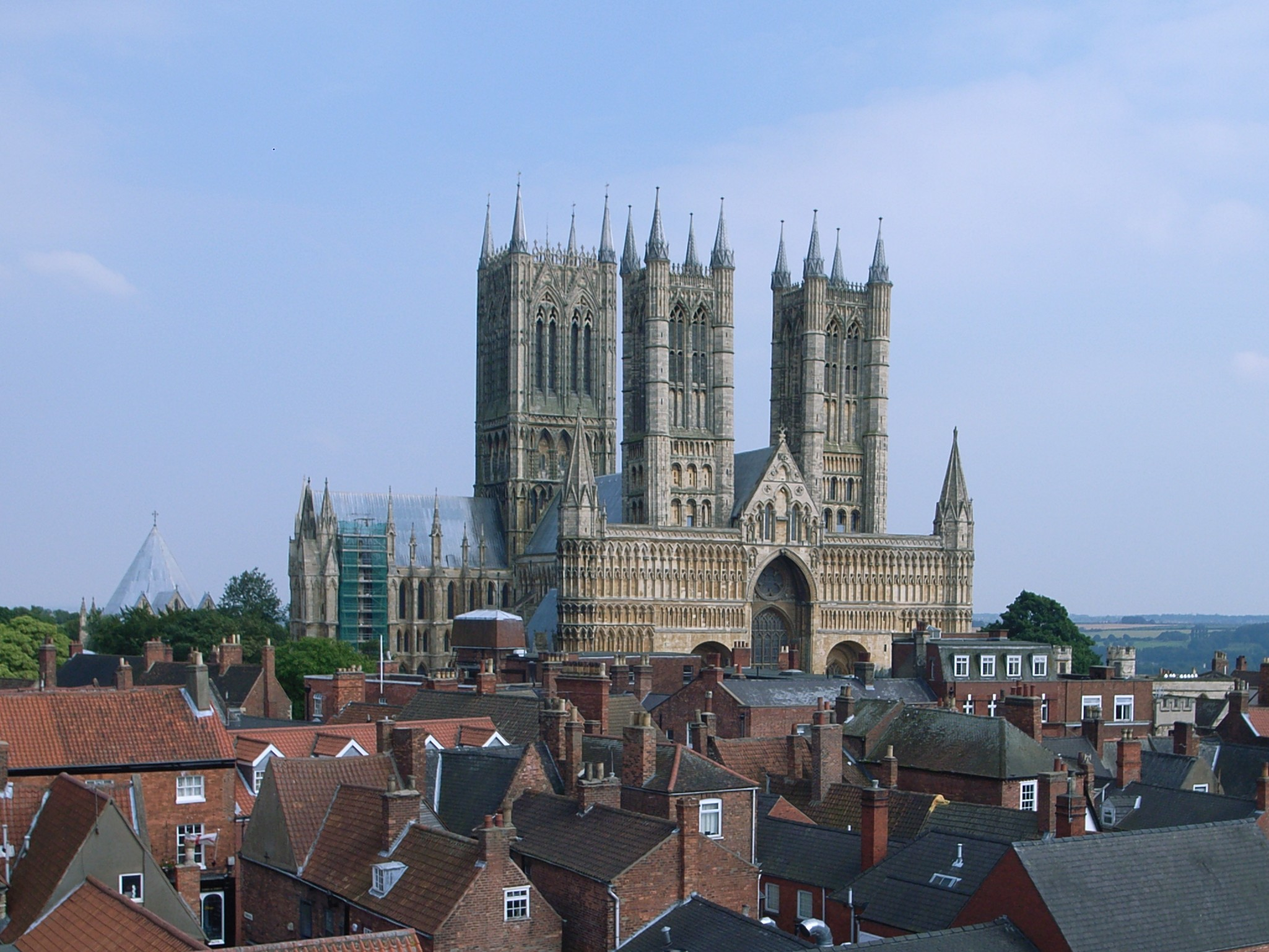
Lincoln Cathedral, England, has two west towers and a huge crossing tower topped for 200 years by the world's tallest spire.

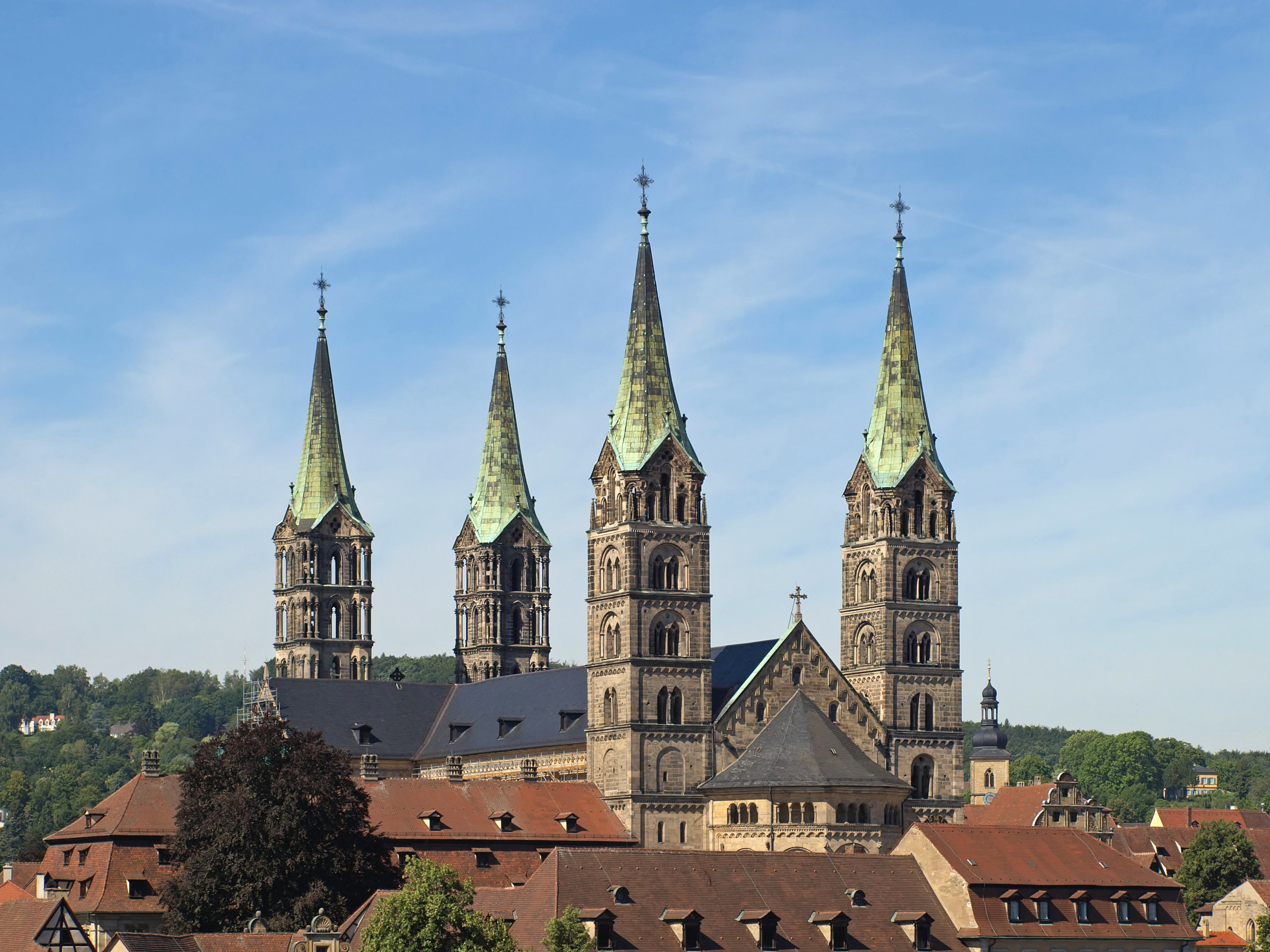
Bamberg Cathedral, Germany, has a tower at each corner, topped by spires which rise from gables and are called "rhenish helms".

Florence Cathedral, Italy, has a free-standing campanile and the largest dome built before the 19th century.

==== West front ====
The façade or "west front" or in some cases termed the westwork, is the most ornate part of the exterior, with the processional doors, often three in number, and often richly decorated with sculpture, marble or stone tracery. The façade often has a large window, sometimes a rose window or an impressive sculptural group as its central feature.

In the Western European tradition, there are frequently paired towers framing the façade. These towers have their origin in a tradition practiced at the Church of the Holy Sepulchre in Jerusalem. During Holy Week the faithful would process along the Way of the Cross, leading to the Basilica, which in Early Christian times consisted of a domed shrine over the site of the tomb, and a "porch" which had a staircase on either side, supported by a small tower, by which the procession entered and exited. These towers were adopted symbolically, particularly in Romanesque architecture, as corner turrets. They flourished in Norman and Gothic architecture as large towers, reaching their height of magnificence at Cologne Cathedral, where they were not completed until the late 19th century.

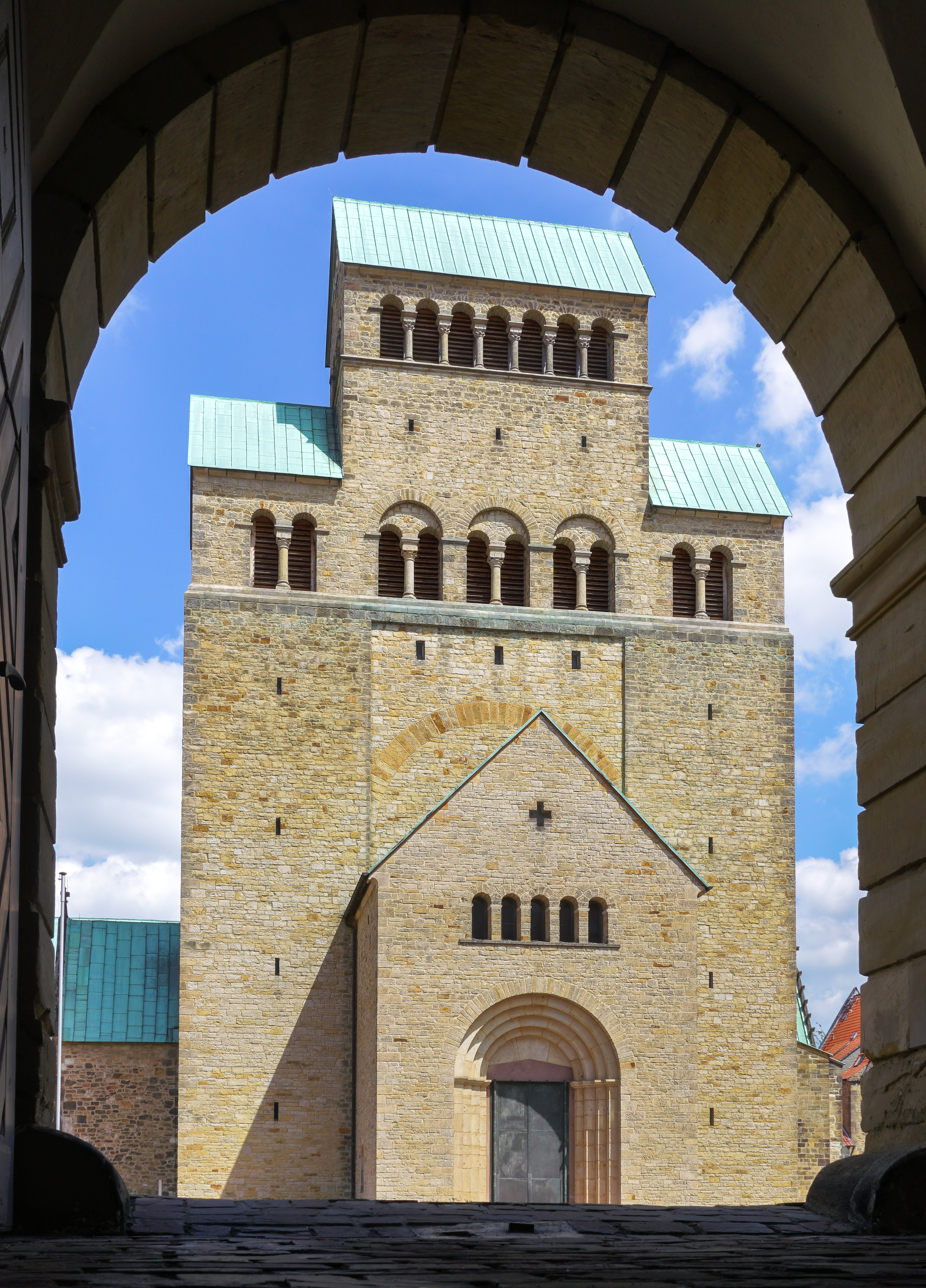
The west front of the Romanesque Hildesheim Cathedral is a westwork with columns and arched arcades.

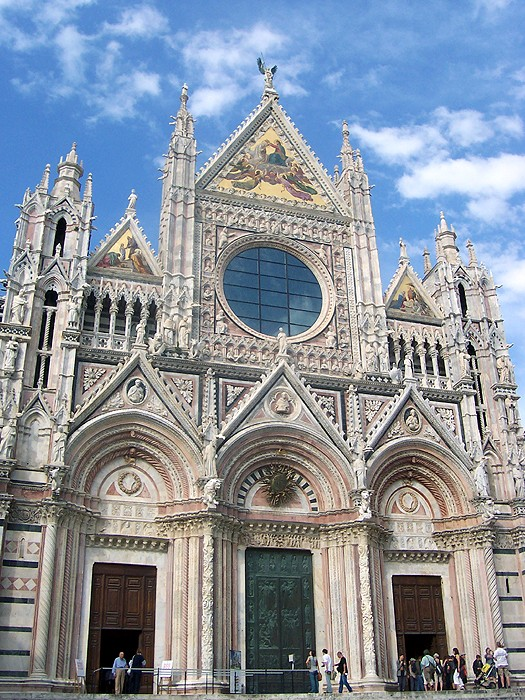
The polychrome façade of Siena Cathedral, Italy, has Byzantine, Romanesque and Gothic elements.

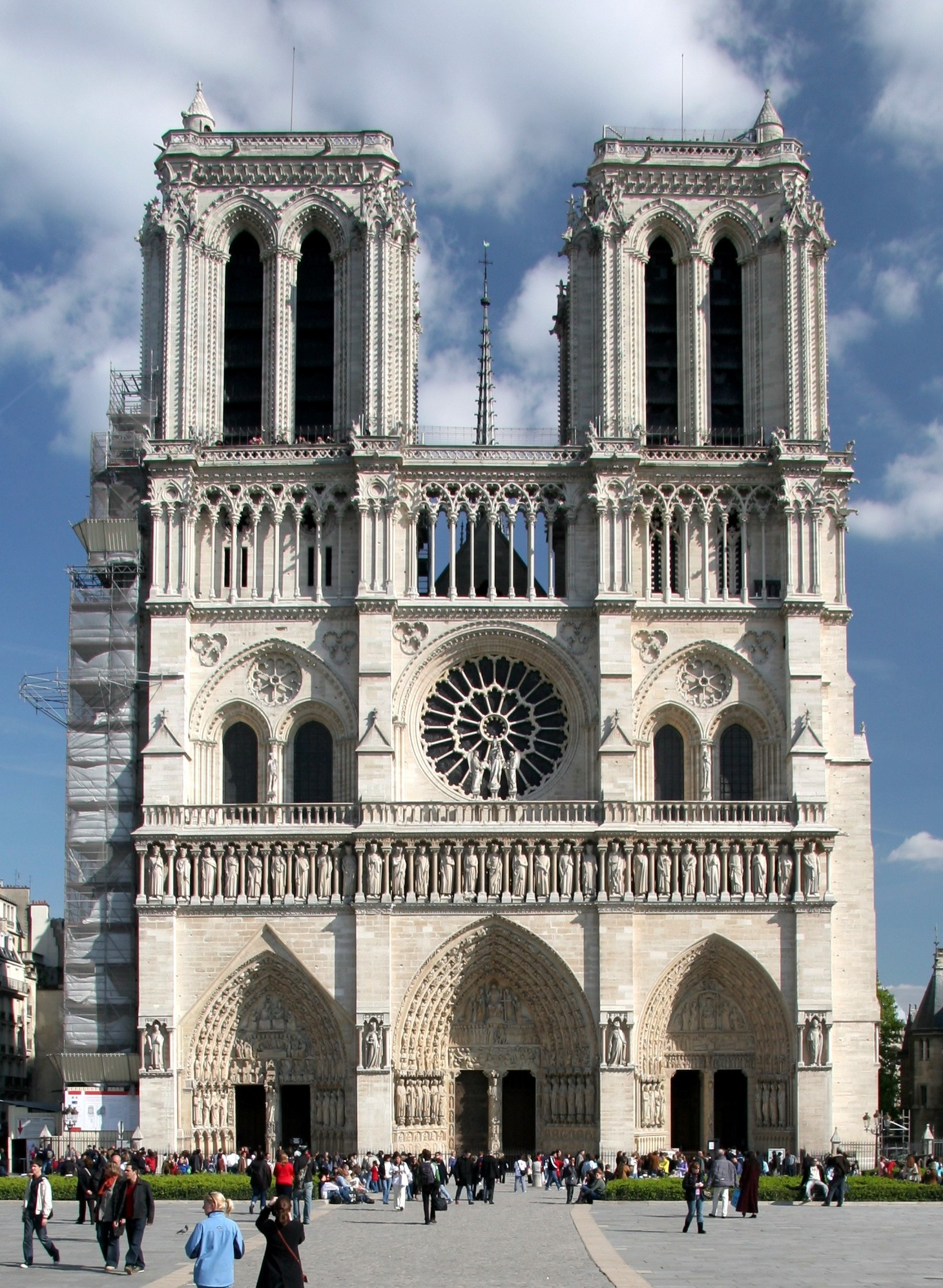
Notre Dame de Paris, has a Gothic west front in which verticals and horizontals are balanced.

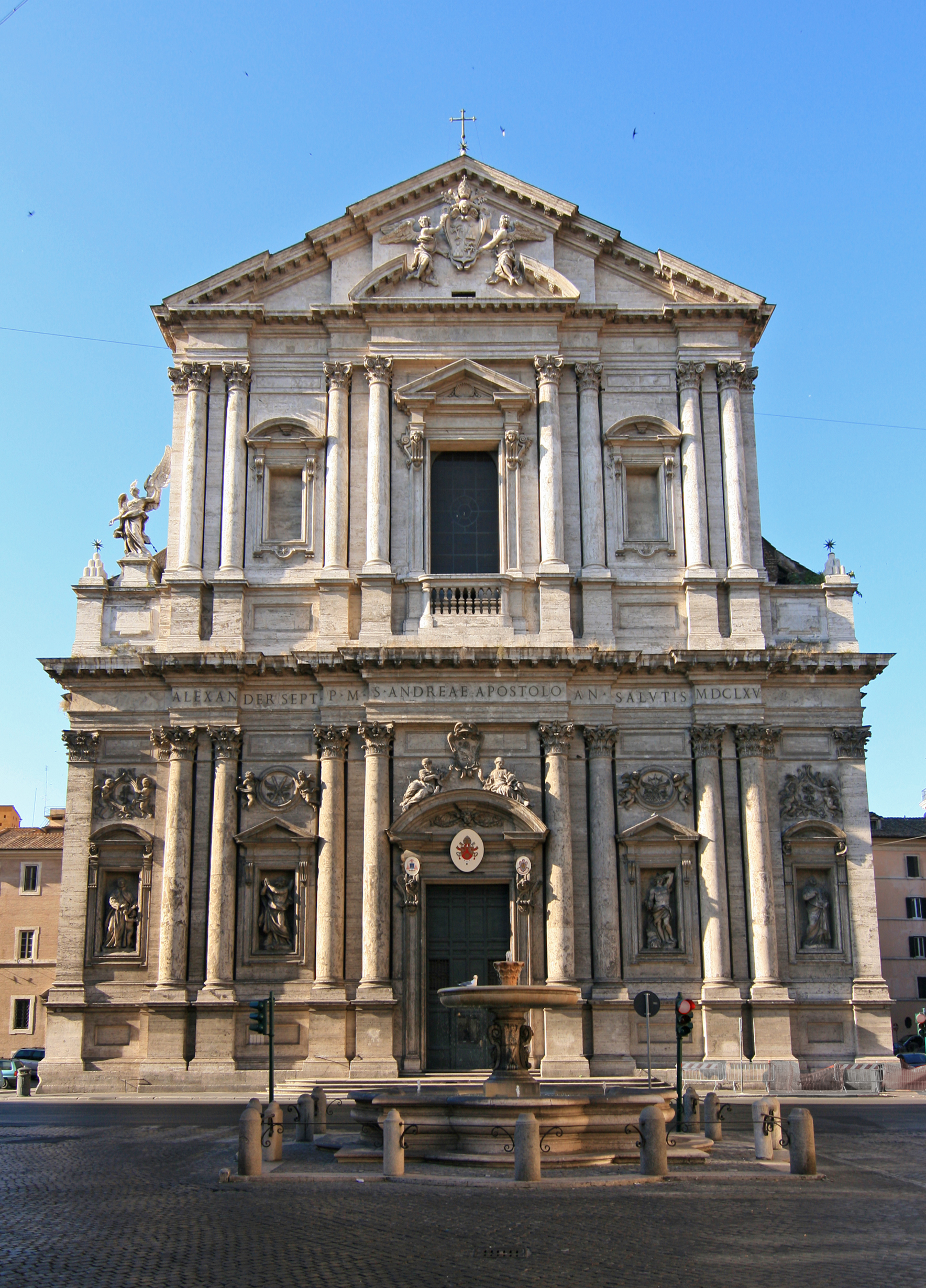
The Renaissance façade of Sant'Andrea della Valle, Rome, is a two tiered temple with paired columns.

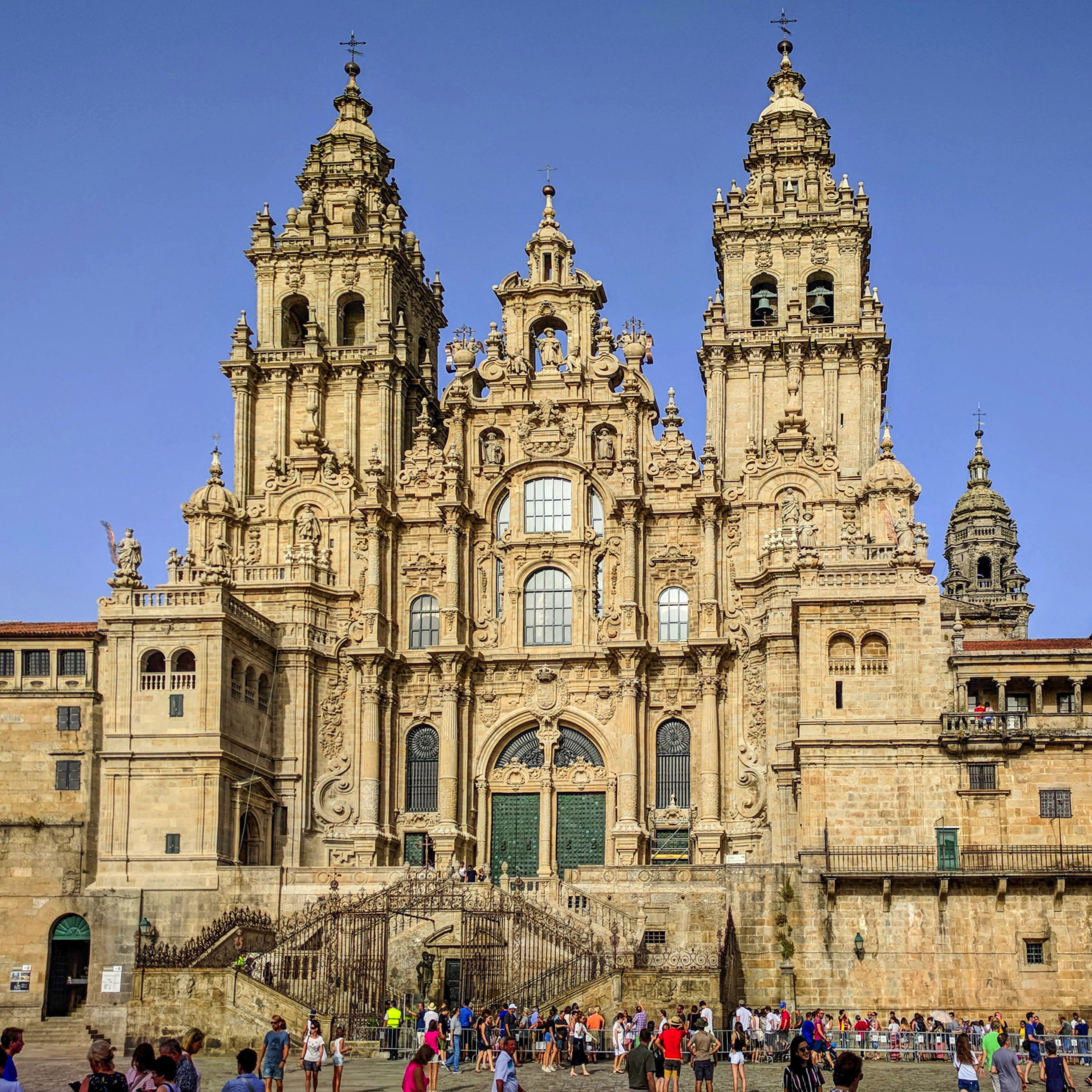
The Spanish Baroque west front of the Romanesque Cathedral of Santiago de Compostela.

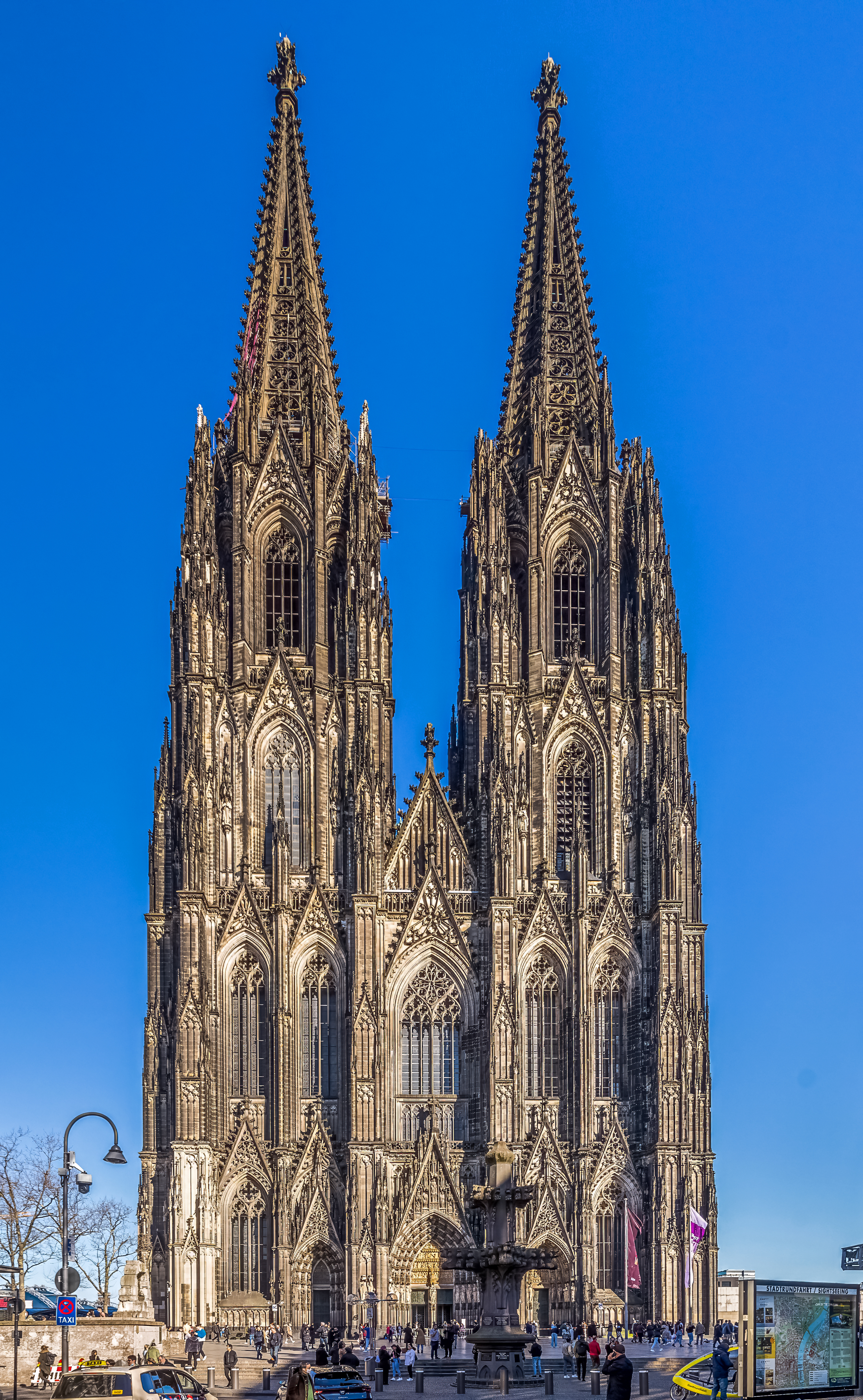
The Gothic west front of Cologne Cathedral was not completed until the 19th century.

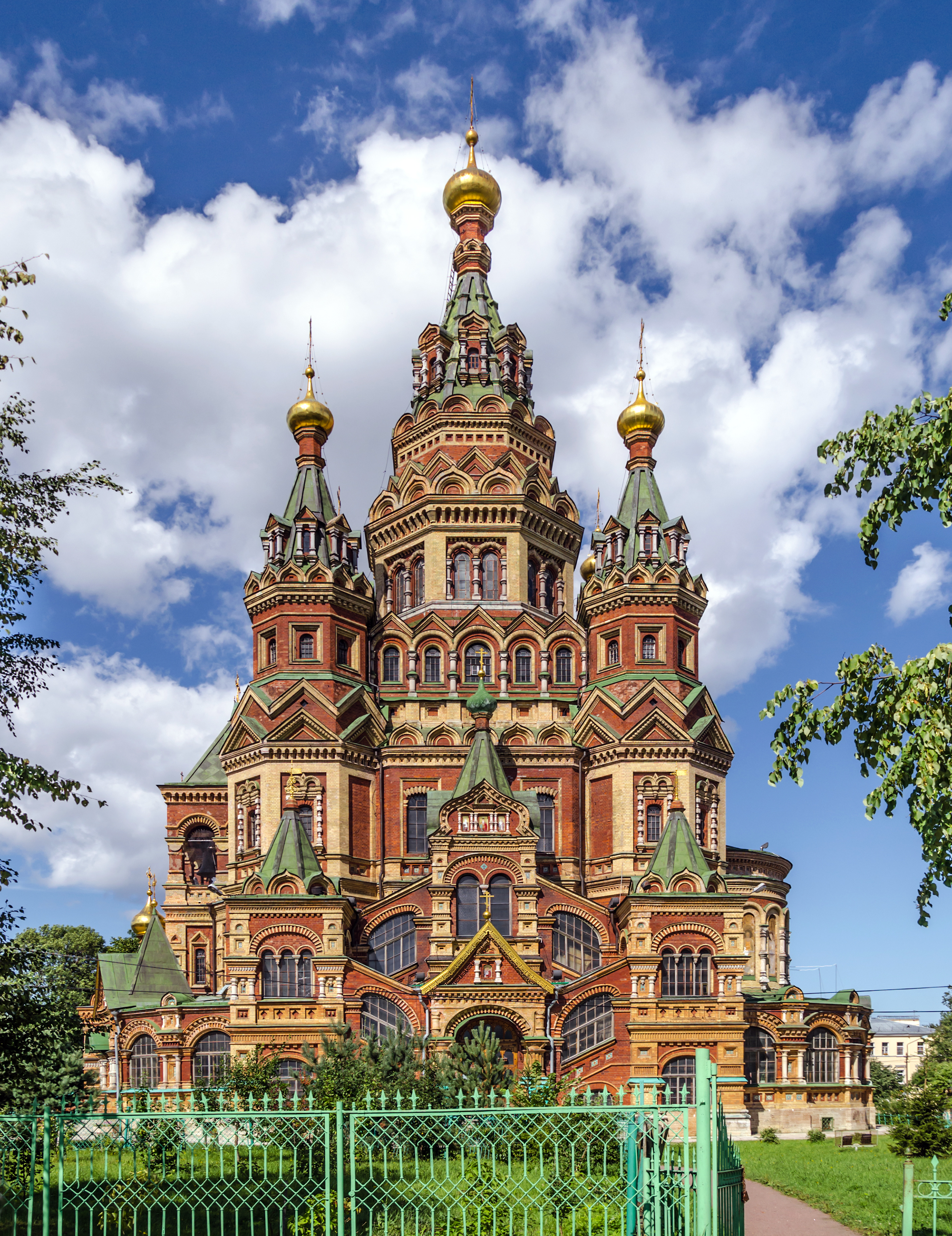
Russian Revival façade of the Cathedral of Saints Peter and Paul, Petergof, Petergof, Saint Petersburg, with polychrome details, tented roofs and domes.

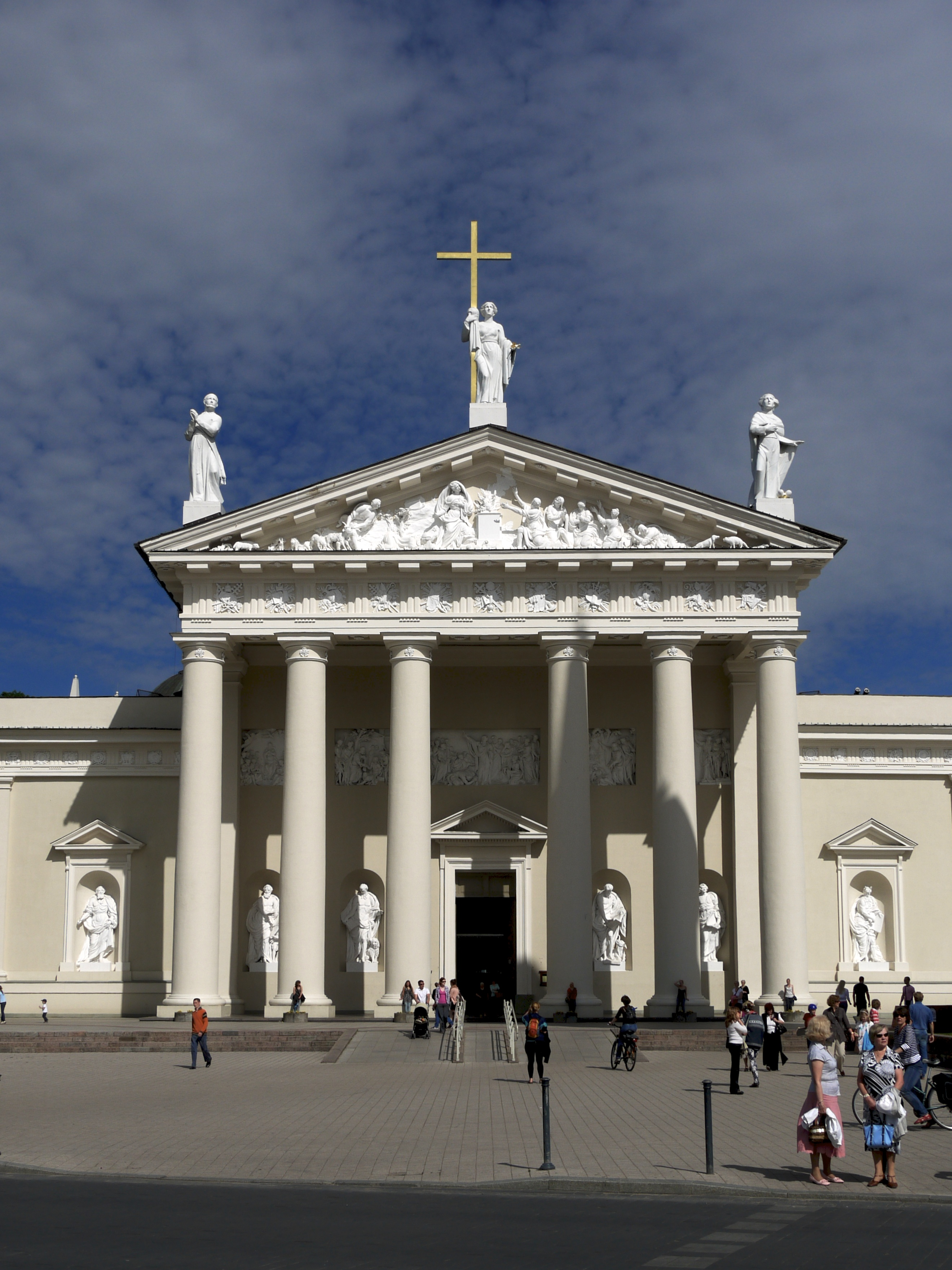
The Neoclassical façade of Vilnius Cathedral, Lithuania, with its pediment and columns.

==== East end ====
The east end is the part of the building which shows the greatest diversity of architectural form. At the eastern end, internally, lies the sanctuary where the altar of the cathedral is located.

- Early Christian and Byzantine – A projecting semi-circular apse.
- Romanesque – A rounded end. It may be a lower apse projecting from a higher square end, usual in Italy, Germany and Eastern Europe. In France and England the chancel terminated in a high eastern end of semi-circular form, surrounded by an ambulatory. While common in France, in England this form has only been retained without significant change at Norwich Cathedral.
- France, Spain, German and Eastern European Gothic – The eastern end is long and extends into a high vaulted apsidal end. The eastern aisles are continued around this apse, making a lower passage or ambulatory. There may be a group of projecting, radiating chapels called a chevet.
- English Gothic – The eastern ends show enormous diversity. Canterbury Cathedral has an apsidal end with ambulatory and projecting chapels. No English Cathedral prior to the 19th century has a fully developed chevet. In the some, notably Lincoln Cathedral, the east end presents a square, cliff-like form while in most this severity is broken by a projecting Lady chapel. There are also examples of the lower aisle continuing around the square east end.
Four forms of east end

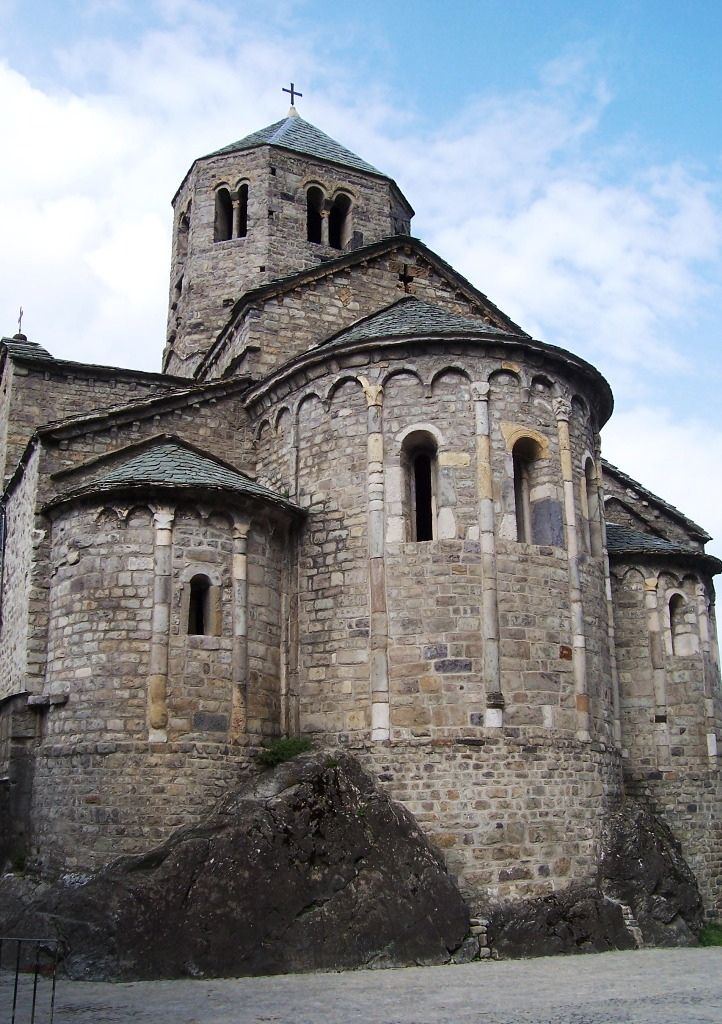
The Abbey of San Salvatore, Italy, has three simple apses

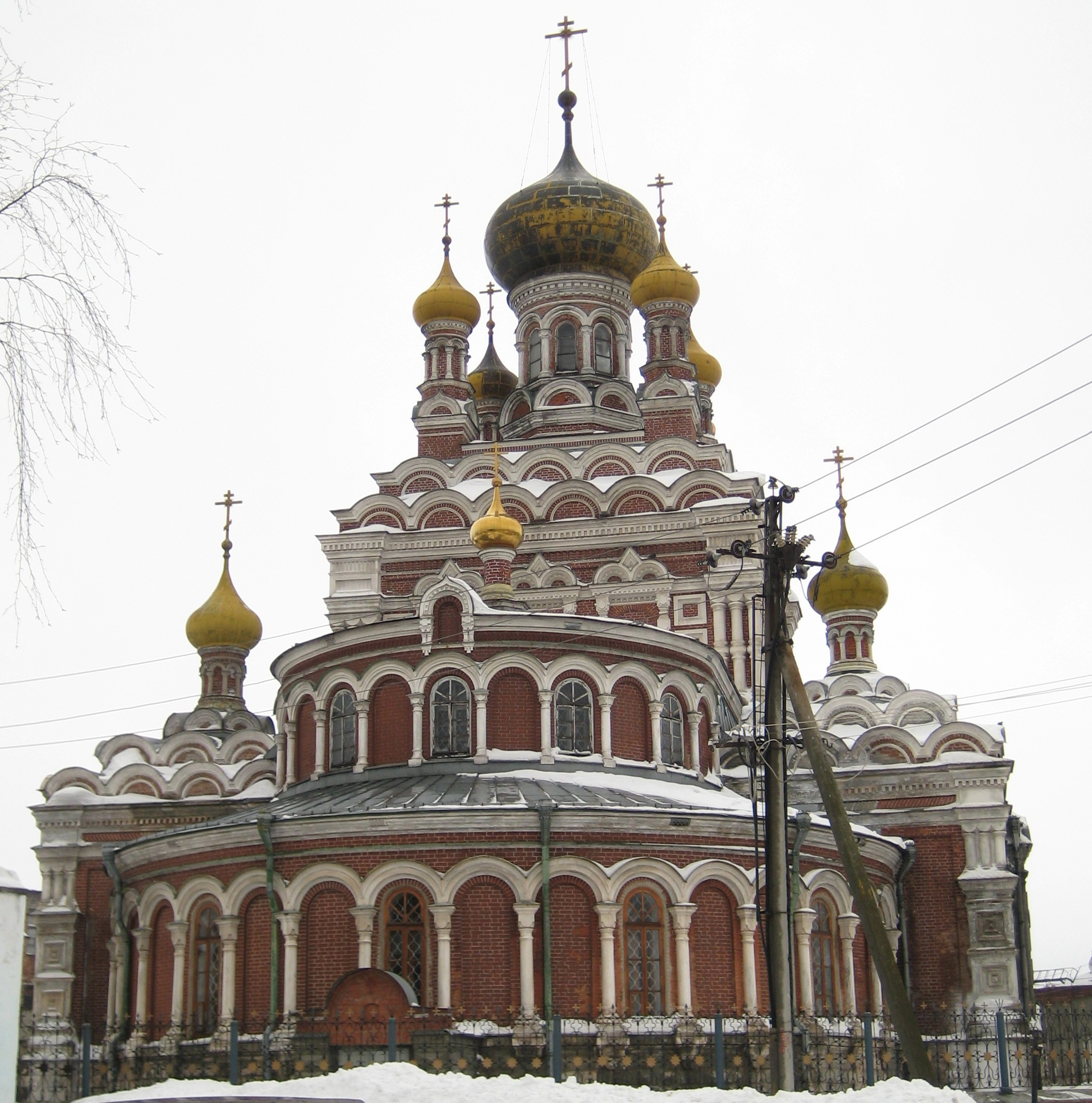
The Church of St Nicola, Kungur, Russia, has an apse and wide ambulatory.

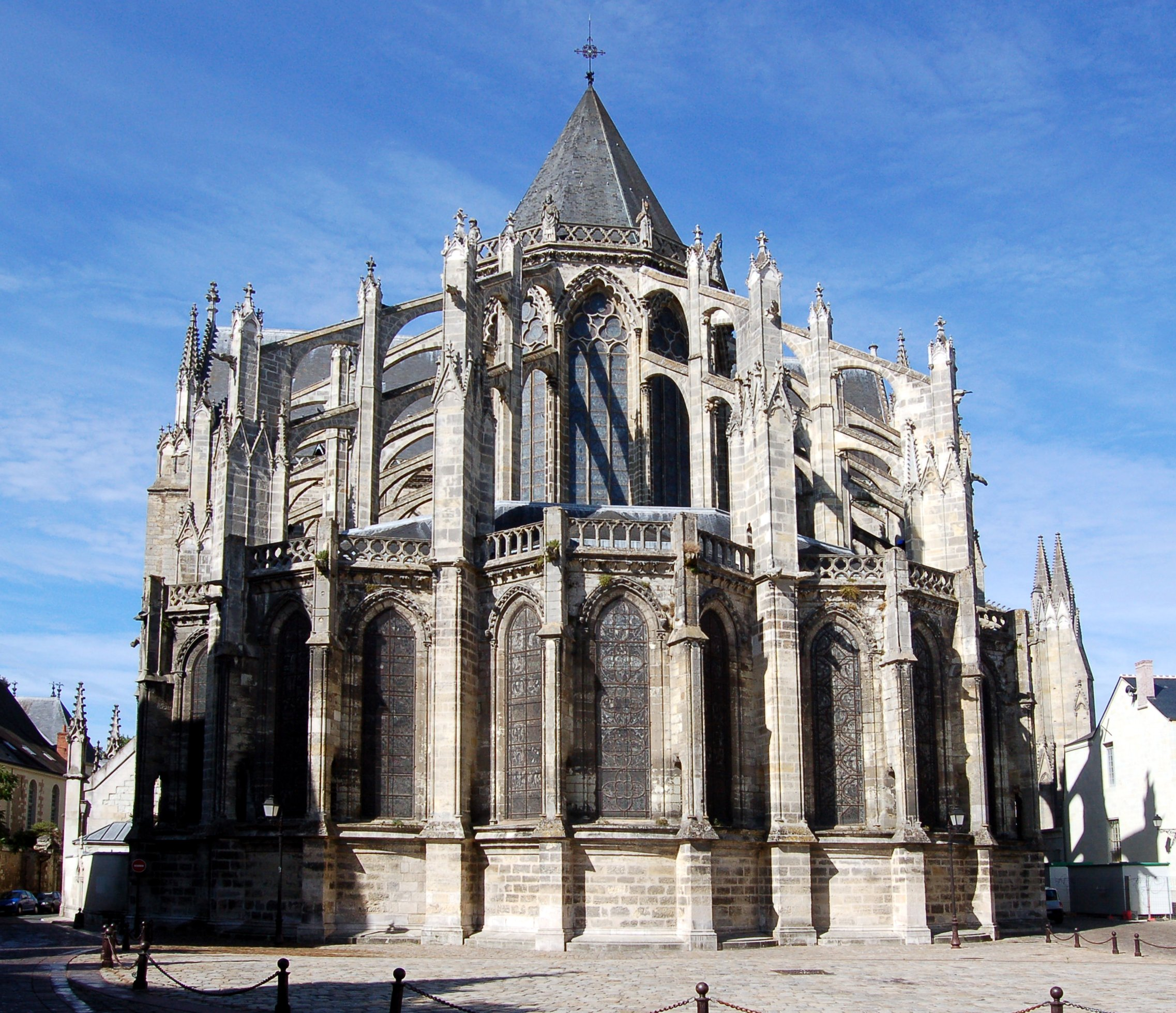
Tours Cathedral, France, has a high apse, ambulatory and chevet of radiating chapels with flying buttresses

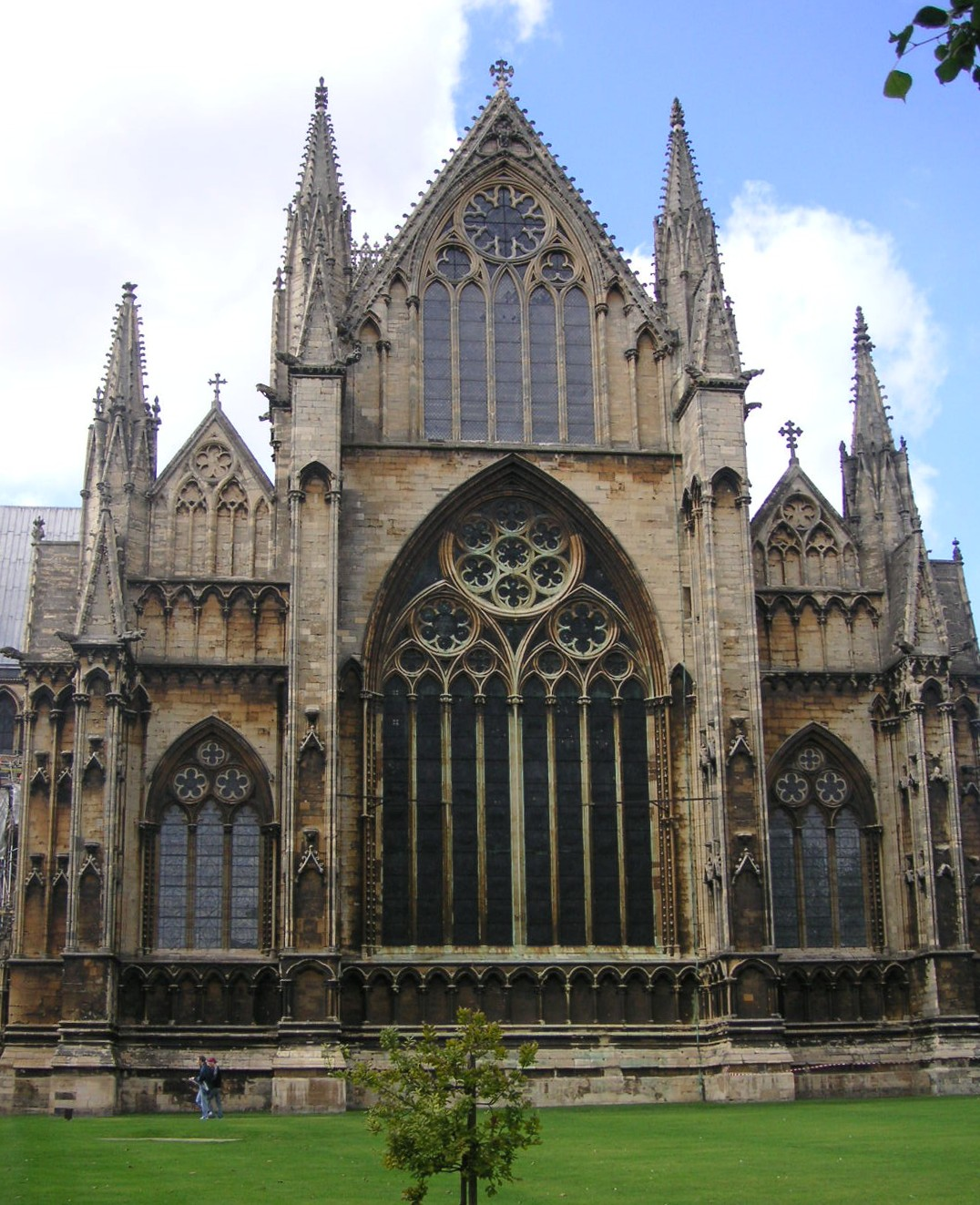
Lincoln Cathedral, England, has the cliff-like, buttressed east end usual in English Gothic churches

==== External decoration ====
The external decoration of a cathedral or large church building is often both architectural and pictorial. Decorative architectural devices include columns, pilasters, arcading, cornices, moldings, finials and tracery. The forms taken by these features is one of the clearest indications of the style and date of any particular building. Pictorial elements may include sculpture, painting and mosaic.

Sculpture is the predominant pictorial decorative element in most regions where buildings are of stone construction. In the great medieval churches of France, Spain, England and much of Germany, figurative sculpture is found adorning façades and portals.

Churches of brick, such as those of much of Italy, are often adorned with mosaics, inlays, inset marble friezes and free-standing statues at the roofline. Mosaics were a particular feature of Byzantine architecture and are the main form of adornment of many Orthodox churches, both externally and internally.

The most common theme in the decoration, both external and internal, of any church, is the salvation of humankind by Jesus Christ. The decorative scheme often functions as a Poor Man's Bible, warning the church-goer that, in Biblical terms, the just rewards for his sinful nature is death, and that only through Jesus can forgiveness and redemption be gained. The scheme typically starts outside the church, on the west front, with the portrayal of Christ the Judge above the lintel of the main door. In Romanesque and Gothic buildings, this is usually a sculptural group, and may entail a whole scene of the Last Judgement with details of souls being weighed and rewarded, or dragged down to Hell by demons. In those churches in which painted rather than sculptured decoration prevails, the Last Judgement is often located on the interior of the west end, rather than the exterior.

Section references:Banister Fletcher, Wim Swaan, Larousse.

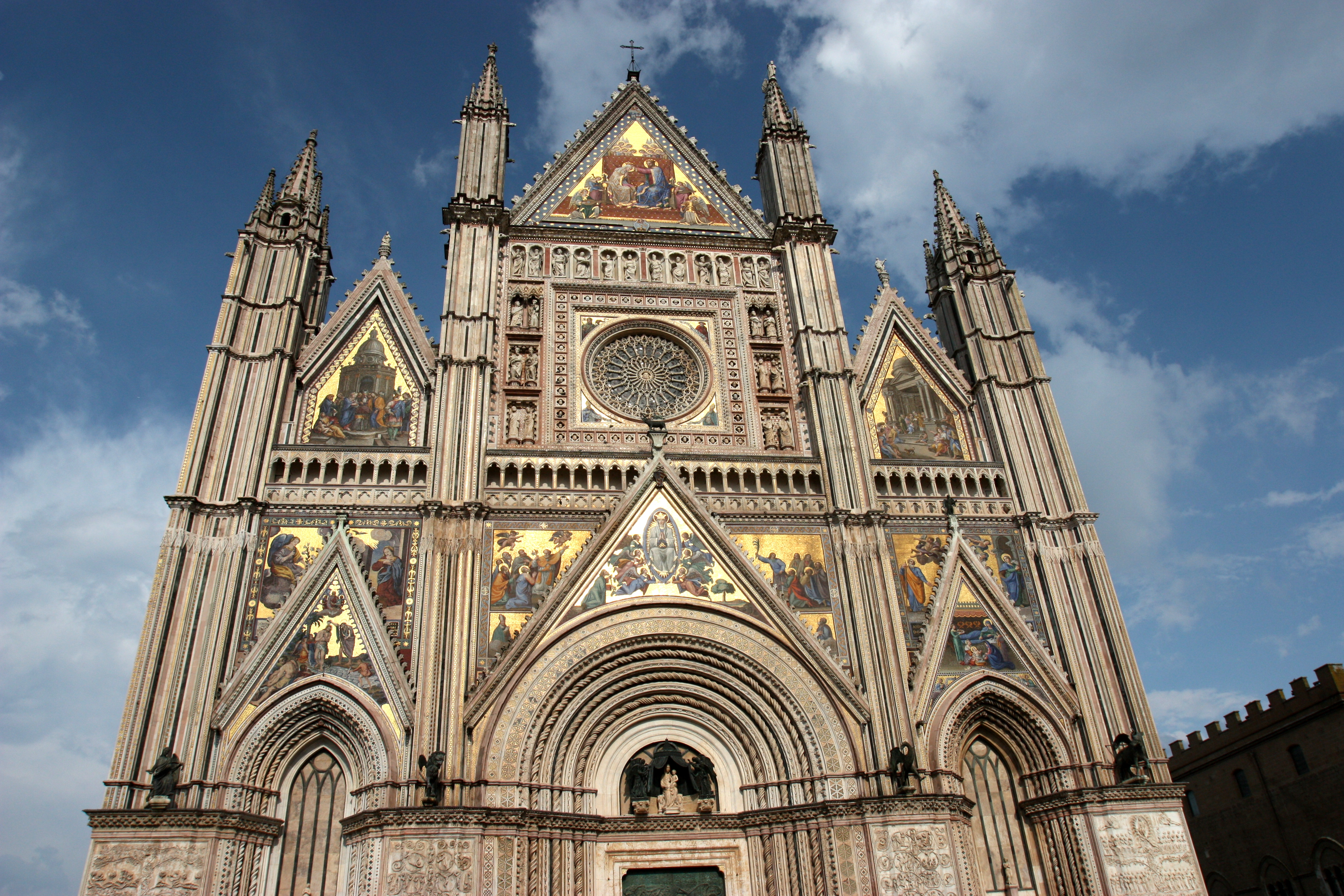
The Gothic façade of Orvieto Cathedral is veneered with polychrome marble, and set, like a reliquary, with colorful mosaics and free-standing statues of marble and bronze.

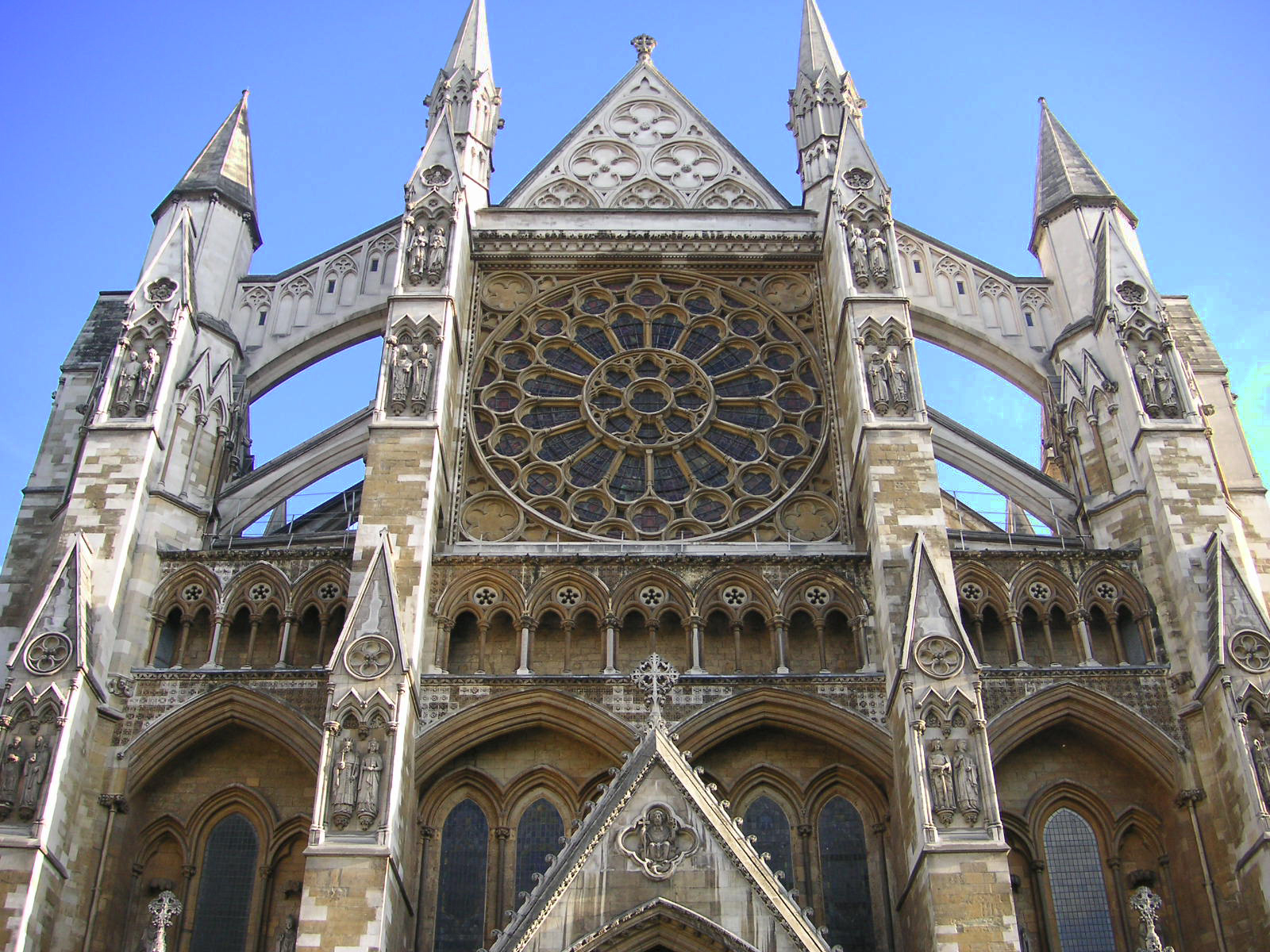
The Gothic transept façade of Westminster Abbey (13th and 19th centuries) is decorated with layers of architectural details such as tracery, arcading and figurative carving.

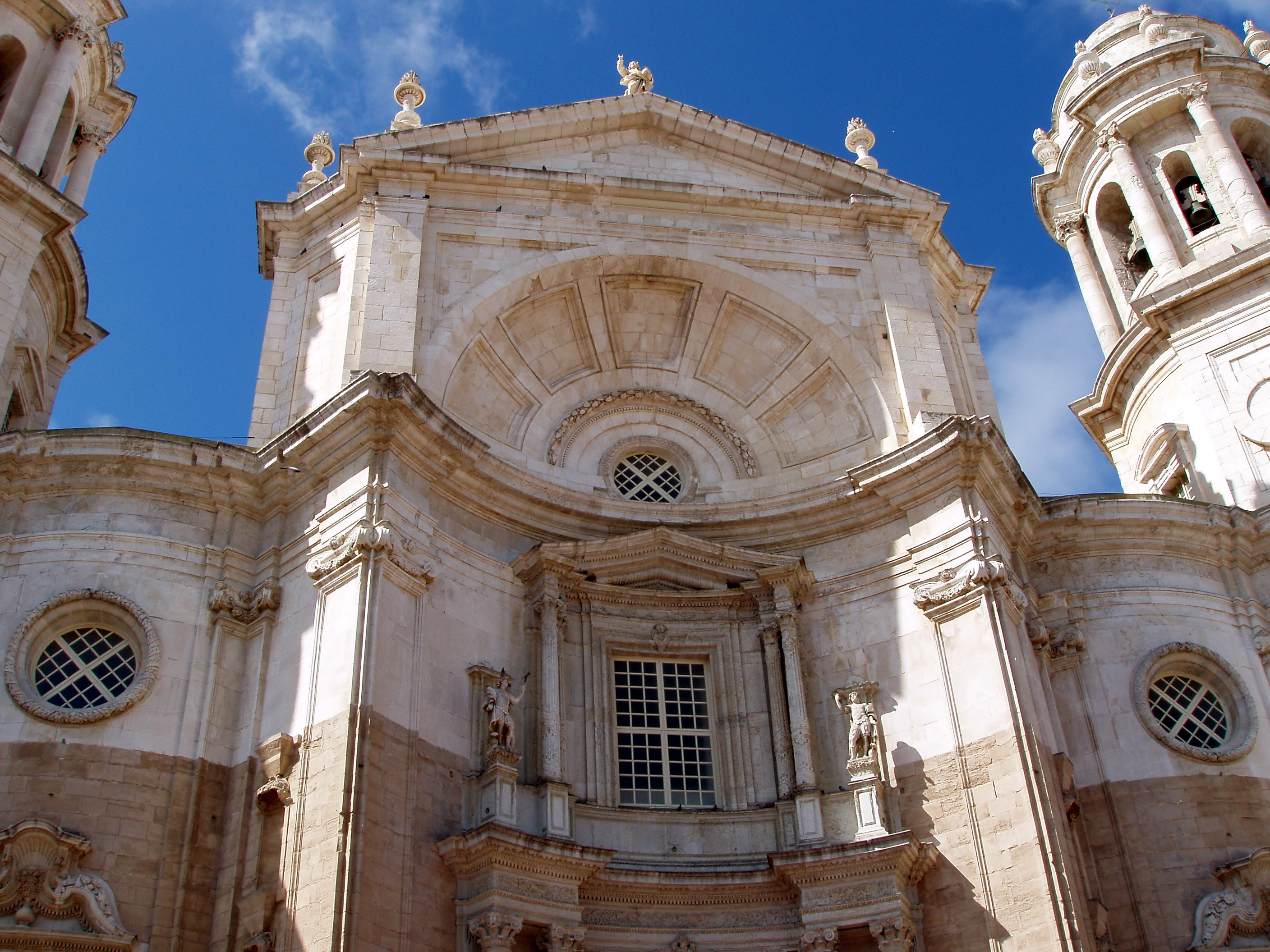
The Baroque façade of the Cathedral of Cadiz contrasts dynamic architectural forms with precise Classical details and careful placement of free-standing sculpture.

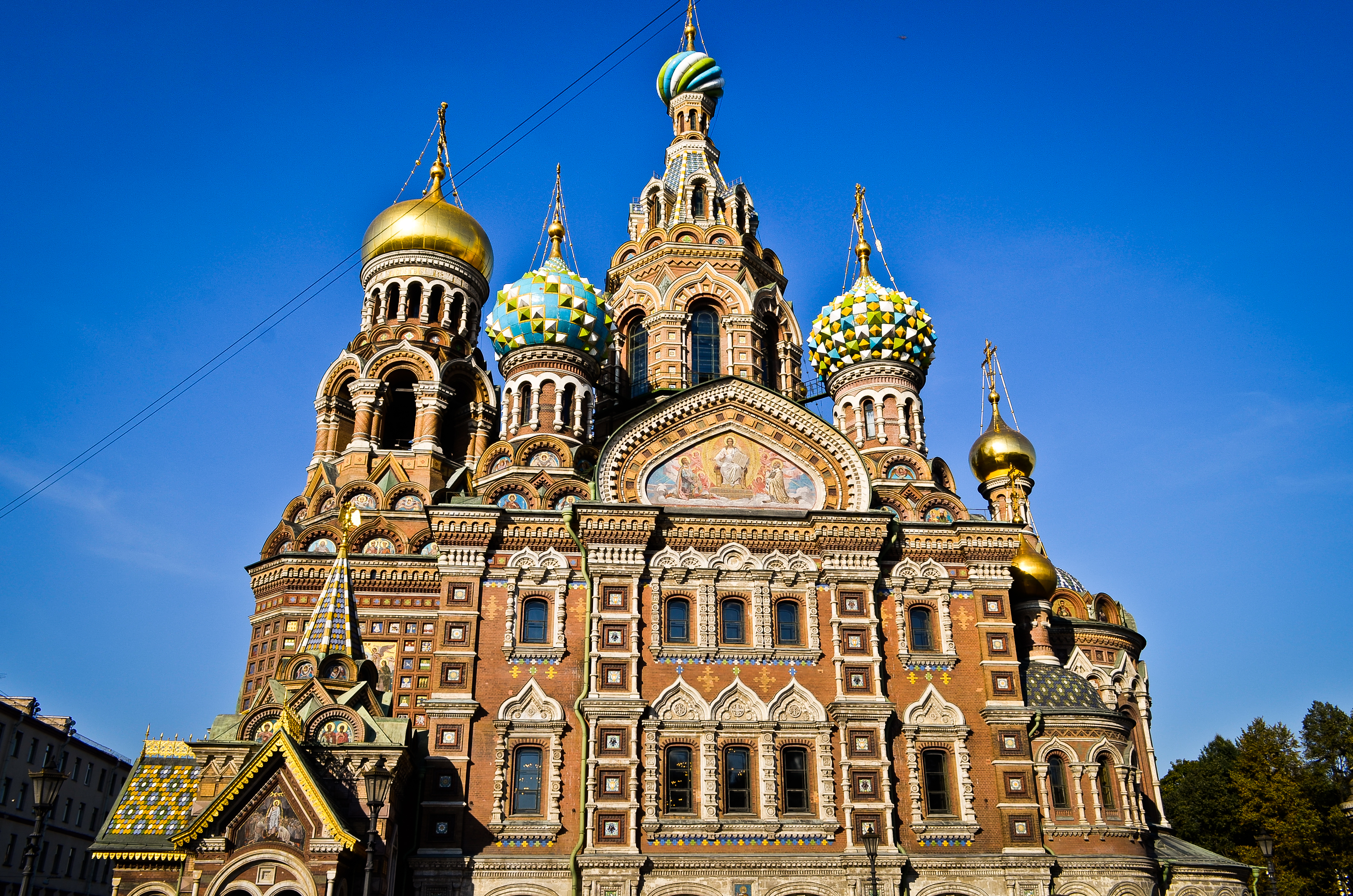
The Russian Revival façade of the Church of the Savior on Blood is of red brick decorated with mosaics, glazed tiles and architectural ornament, particularly the ogee arches known as kokoshniks.

=== Internal features ===
==== Nave and aisles ====
The main body of the building, making the longer arm of the cross, where worshippers congregate, is called the nave. The term is from the Latin word for ship. A cathedral is symbolically a ship bearing the people of God through the storms of life. In addition, the high wooden roof of a large church is similarly constructed to the hull of a ship.

The nave is braced on either side by lower aisles, separated from the main space by a row of piers or columns. The aisles facilitate the movement of people, even when the nave is full of worshippers. They also strengthen the structure by buttressing the inner walls that carry the high roof, which in the case of many cathedrals and other large churches, is made of stone. Above the roof of the aisle are the clerestory windows which light the nave.

In some large churches, particularly late Medieval churches, there are two aisles on either side of nave. Other churches have a single aisle and a row of chapels on either side. In some churches, particularly in Germany, the aisles are almost as high as the nave, forming a "hall church". In this case, because there is no clerestory, the aisle windows are often very tall, to admit light to the nave.

Three forms of nave and aisles

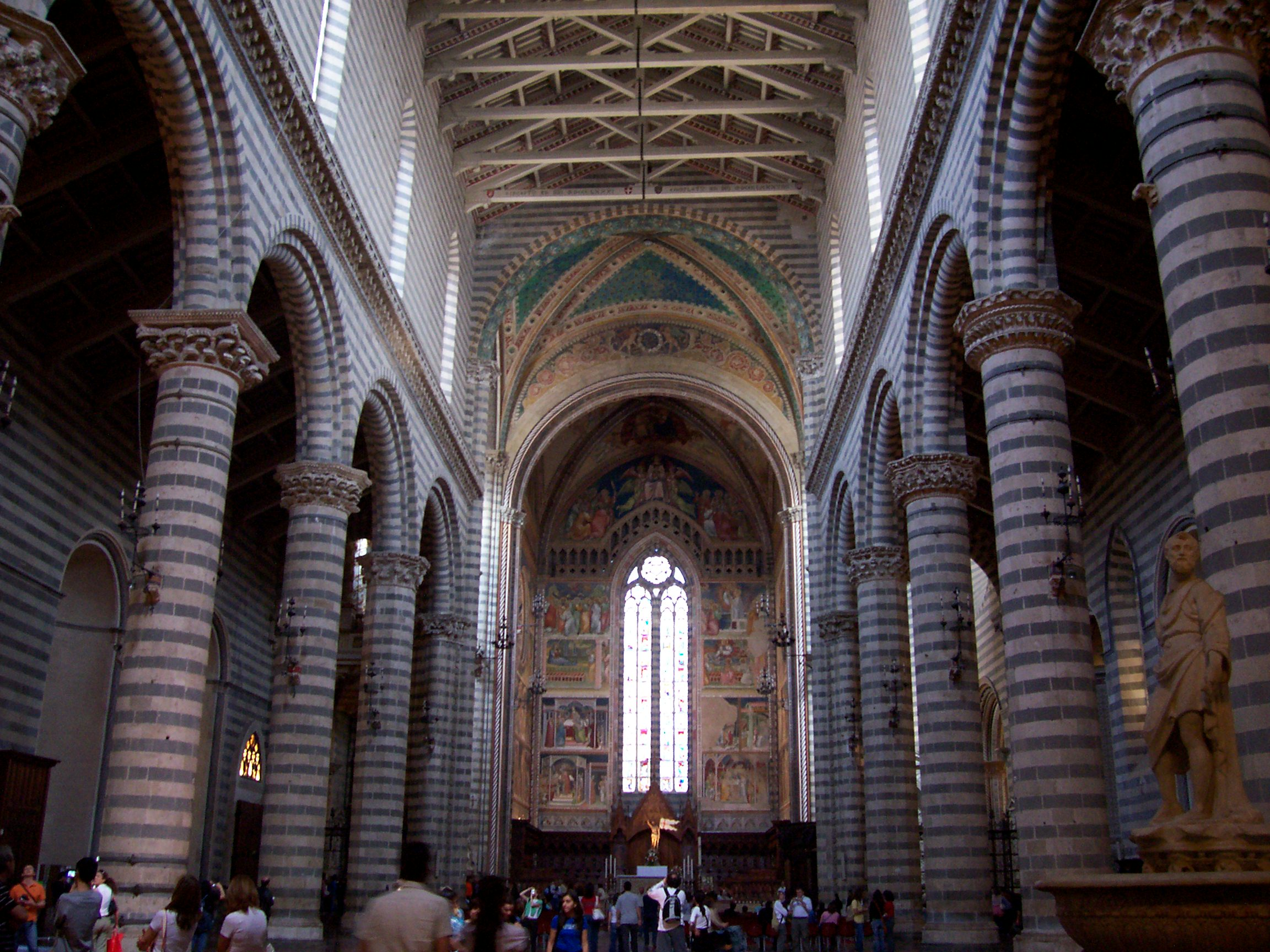
The nave of Orvieto Cathedral, Italy, has two stages: arcade and simple clerestory windows separated by a cornice.

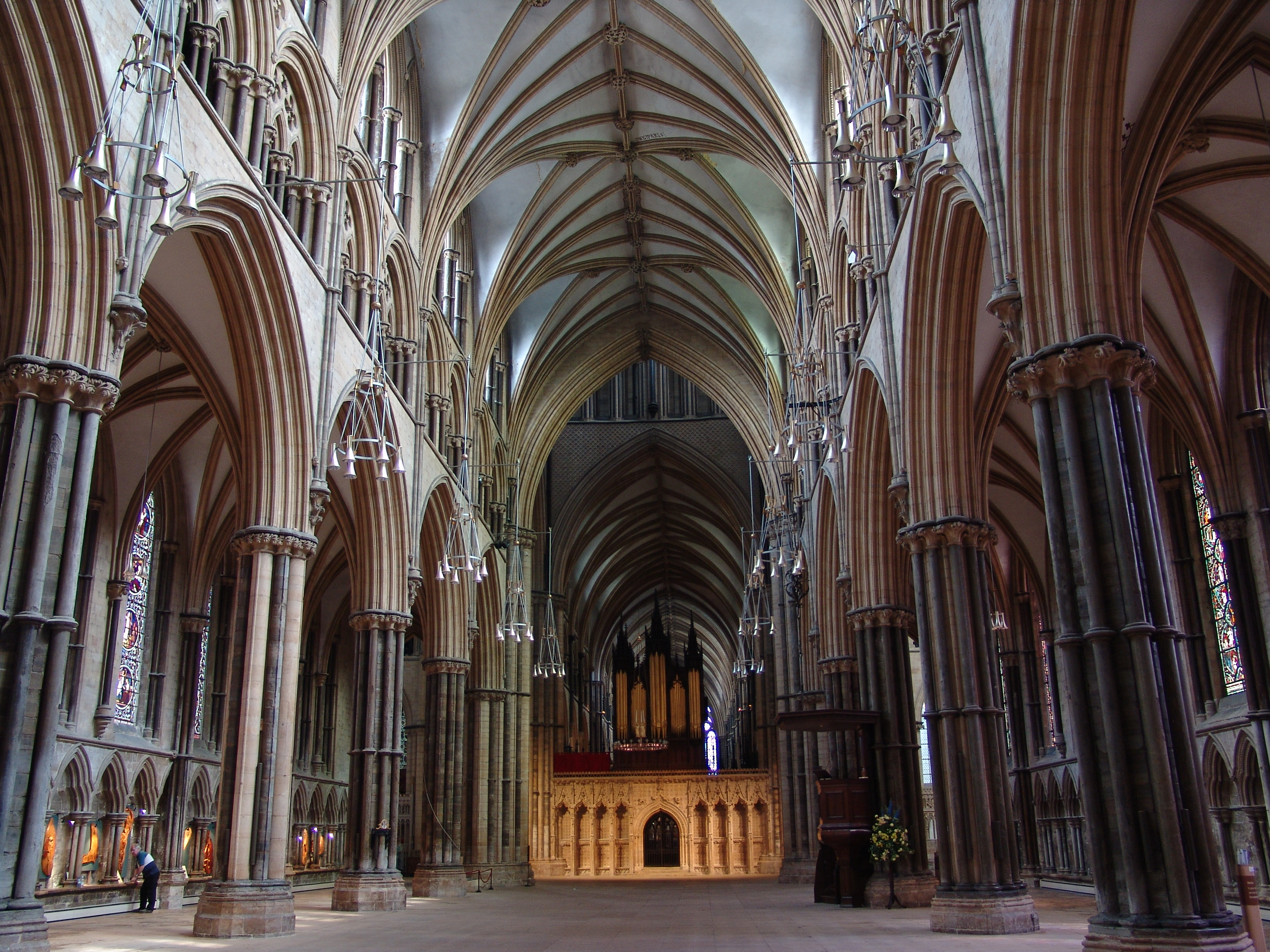
Medieval Lincoln Cathedral, England, has three stages: arcade, gallery and clerestory, united by vertical shafts.

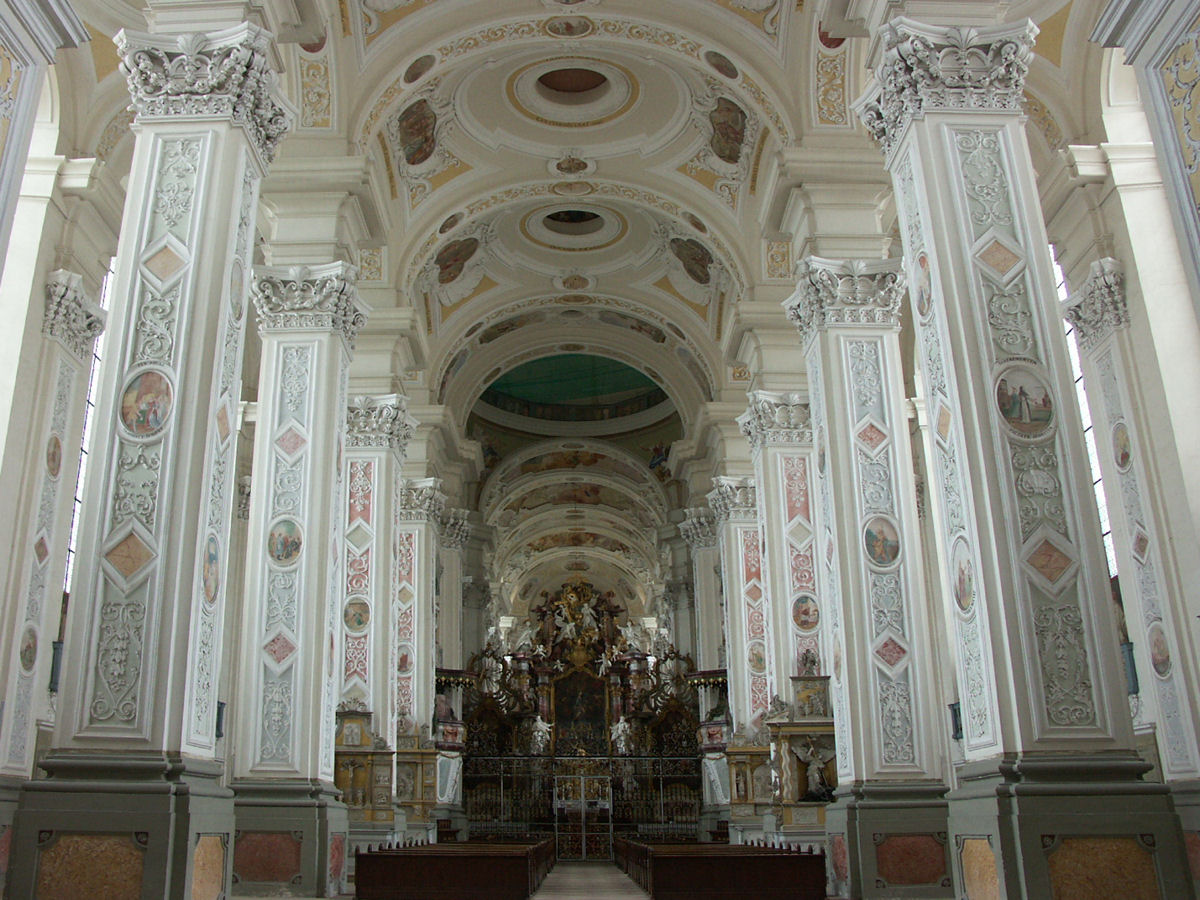
The Baroque Schöntal Abbey at Schöntal, Germany, is a hall church with nave and aisles rising to about the same height.

==== Crossing and transept ====
The crossing is the point in a church at which the transept intersects the nave. This point is often marked externally by a tower or dome and internally by the piers and arches that are required to bear the weight of such a structure. The interior of the dome or tower may be one of the major architectural features of the interior of the church. In a centrally planned church such as Hagia Sophia, and typical of many Orthodox churches, the major interior space of the building is roofed by the dome.

The transept is symbolic of the arms of the Cross, but also provides space for congregation and for additional chapels. Transept chapels are often dedicated to a particular saint, or to a particular aspect in the life and ministry of Christ, such as the Nativity or the Resurrection. In some English cathedrals there is often a second transept containing chapels, to facilitate the saying of the Divine Office by clergy each day.

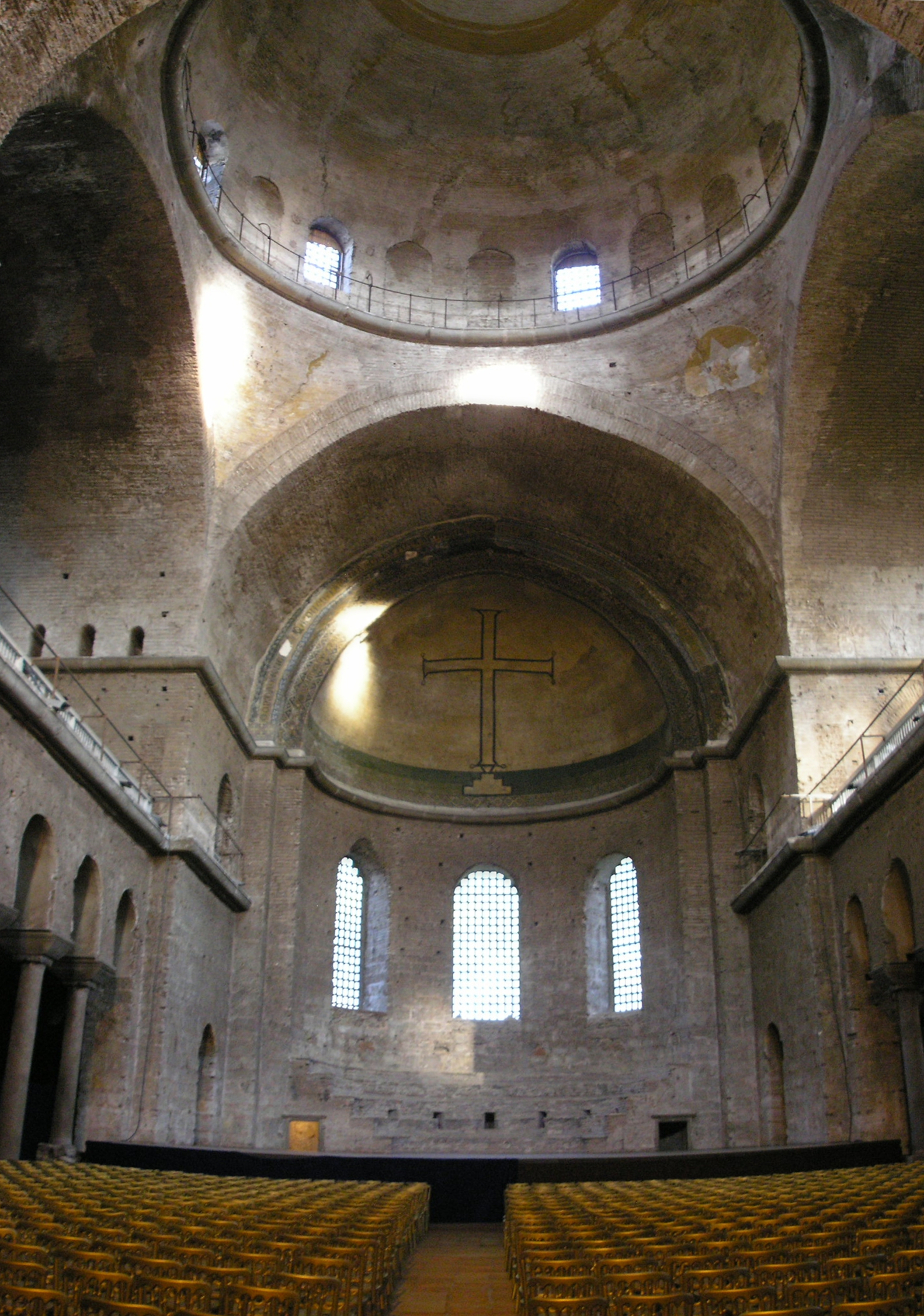
Byzantine Hagia Eirene, Istanbul, has a dome on pendentives.

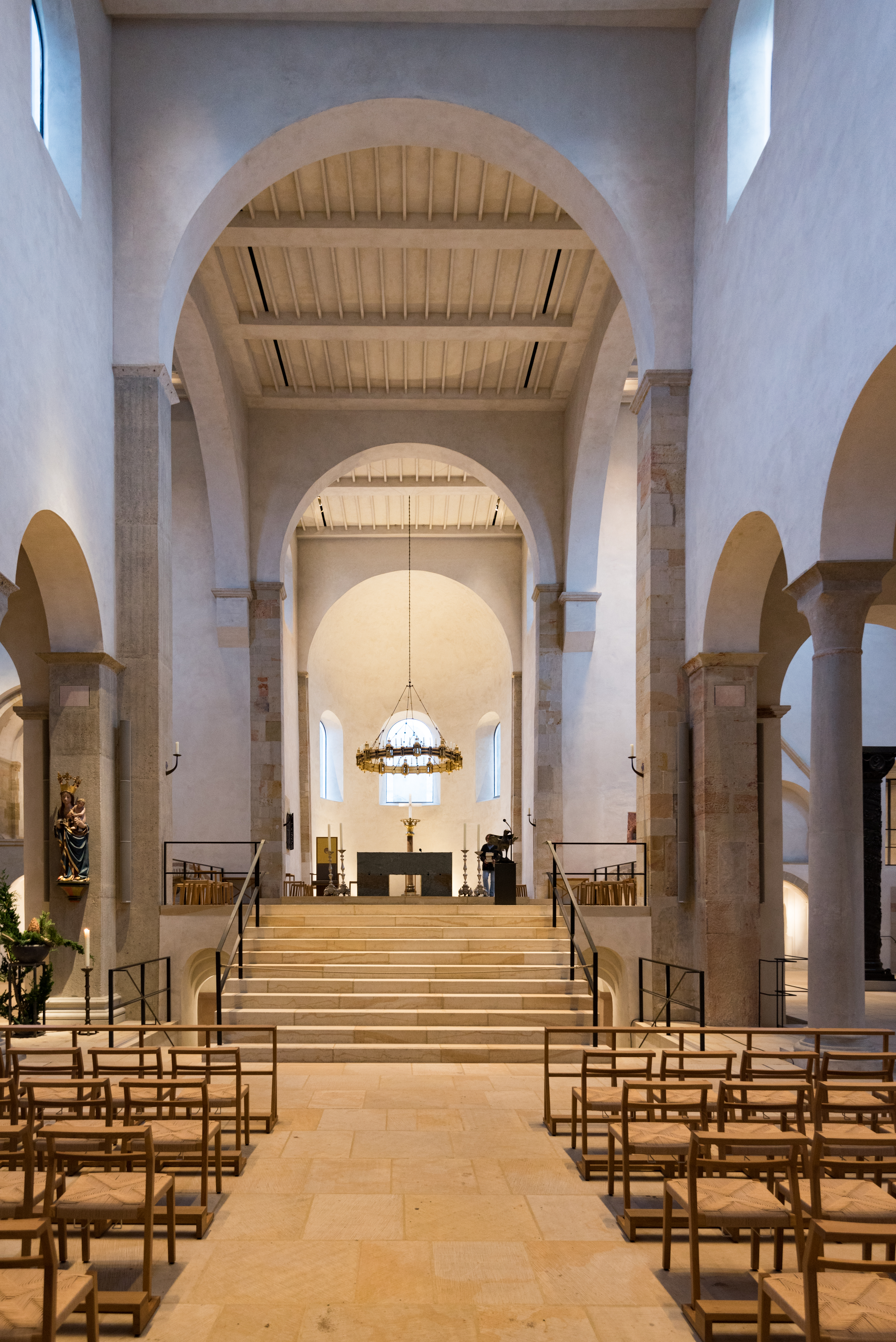
Romanesque Hildesheim Cathedral has a simple flat roof over the crossing, which is common in most Romanesque churches.

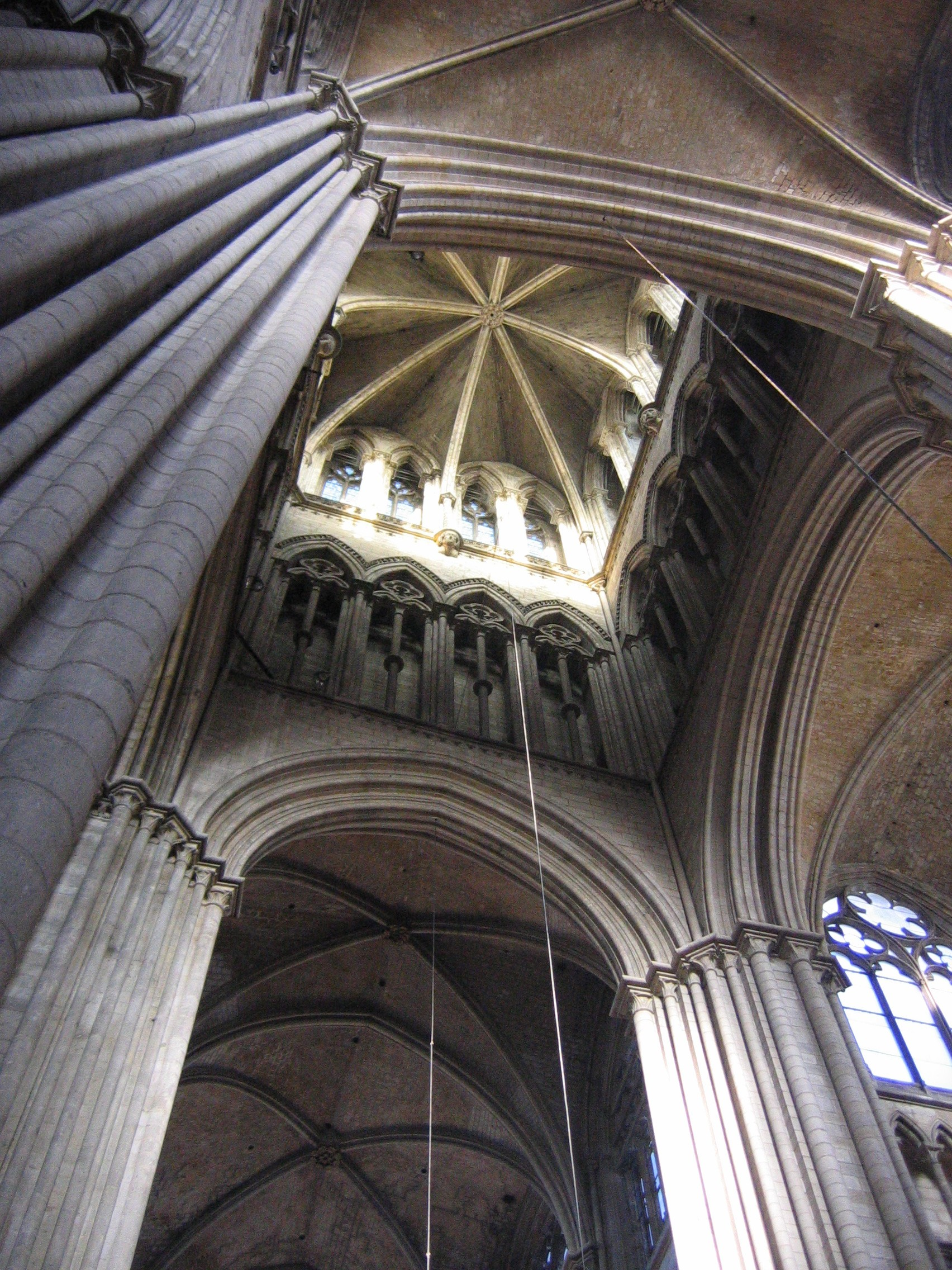
Gothic Rouen Cathedral has a lantern tower with ribbed vault.

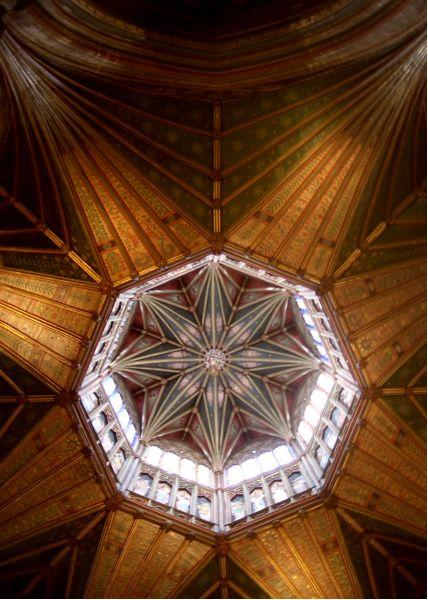
Norman Ely Cathedral has a Gothic octagon supported on wooden hammer beams.

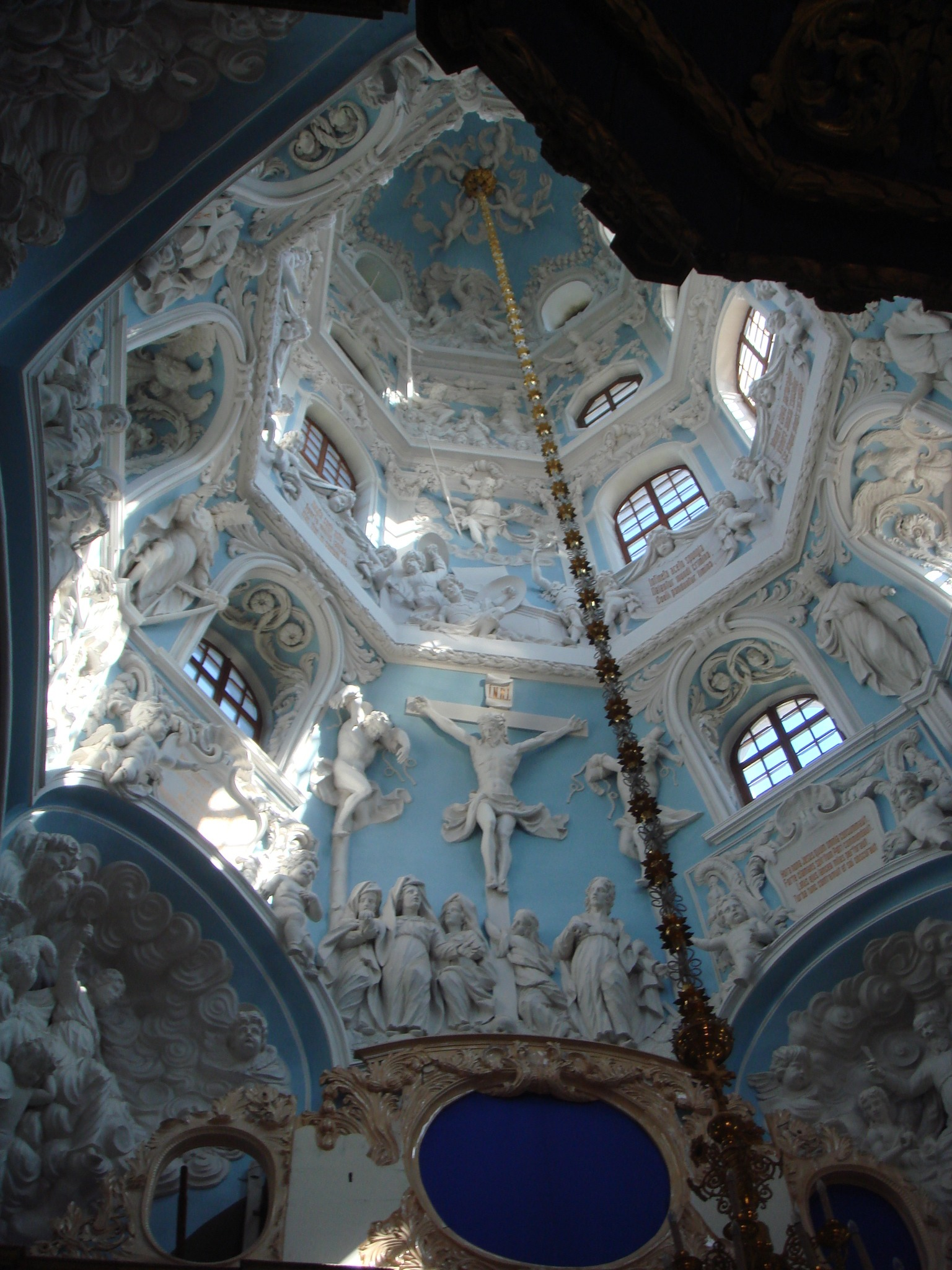
Church of the Theotokos of the Sign, Dubrovitsy, has an elaborate Rococo variation on the Russian tented roof.

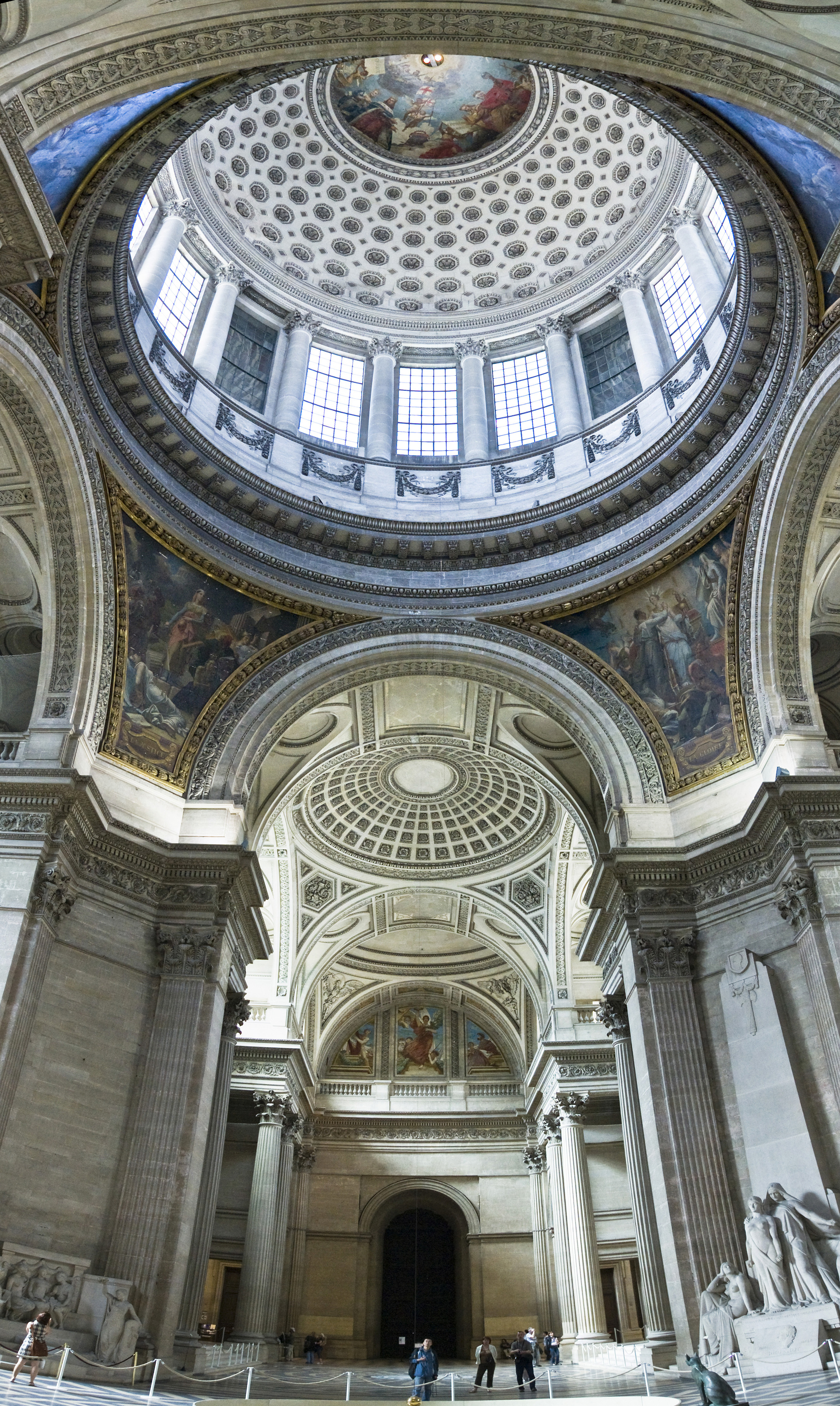
The 18th century Pantheon, Paris, has a dome on a rotunda.

==== Chancel, choir and presbytery ====
In a church in which part of the body of the church extends beyond the transept, then this extension is architecturally termed the "chancel", for which the stricter definition includes only the choir and the sanctuary with the high altar, but in the common wider definition includes the whole eastern arm beyond the crossing. This architectural form is common in Norman and Gothic architecture. The choir, where it exists, normally contains the choir stalls, and the "sanctuary" and the "cathedra" (bishop's throne). The architectural "choir" is sometimes termed the "quire" to differentiate it from the choir of singers. In the Middle Ages these were all clergy, or boys in an attached choir school, and the chancel (strictly defined) was the area occupied by officiating clergy, with few lay intrusions. In cathedrals the canons and other priests sat in the choir, as did the monks in monastic churches.

In those English cathedrals with two transepts, there is a further area beyond the choir which is called the presbytery. This is where the priests or monks could make their private devotions (and is not to be confused with the general sense of a room to the side where the clergy put on their vestments, or a Catholic clergy house). Often there are many additional chapels located towards the eastern end of a cathedral or abbey church. The chief among these is typically the Lady chapel which is dedicated to the Virgin Mary.

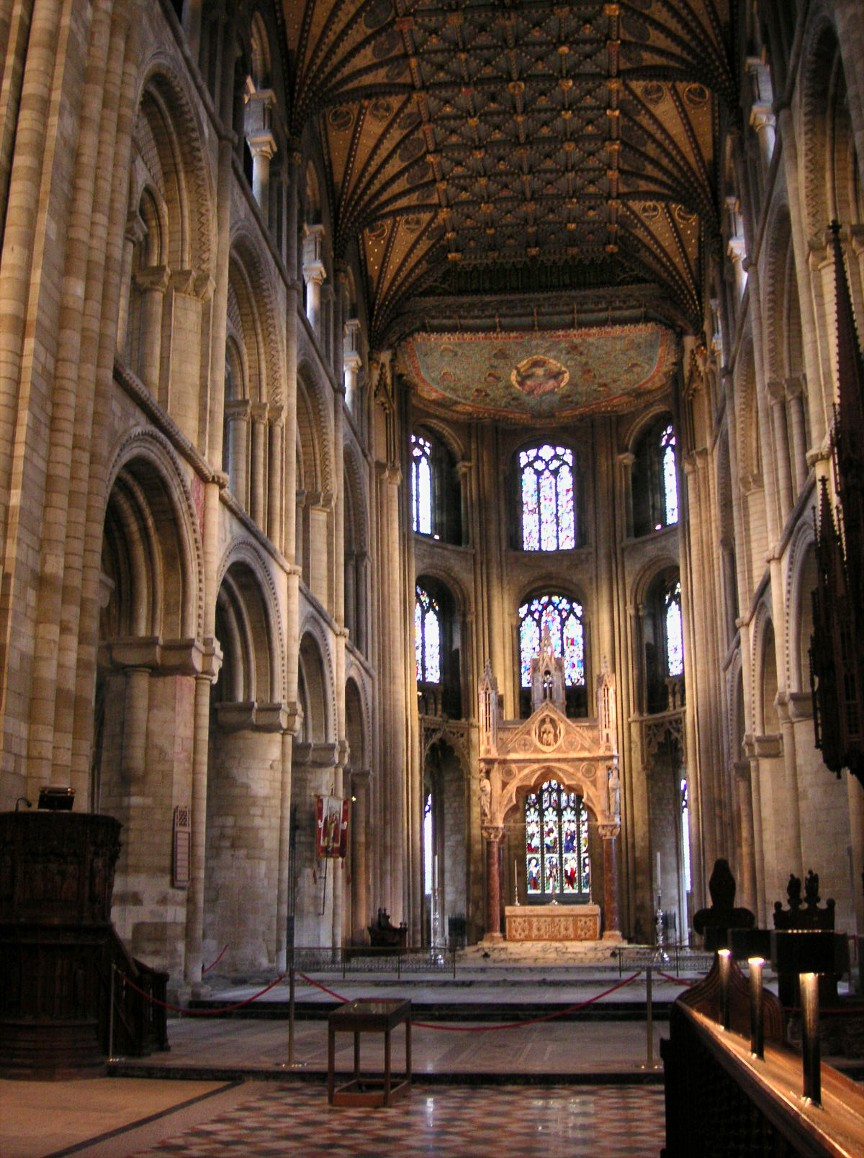
The Norman choir at Peterborough Cathedral, England

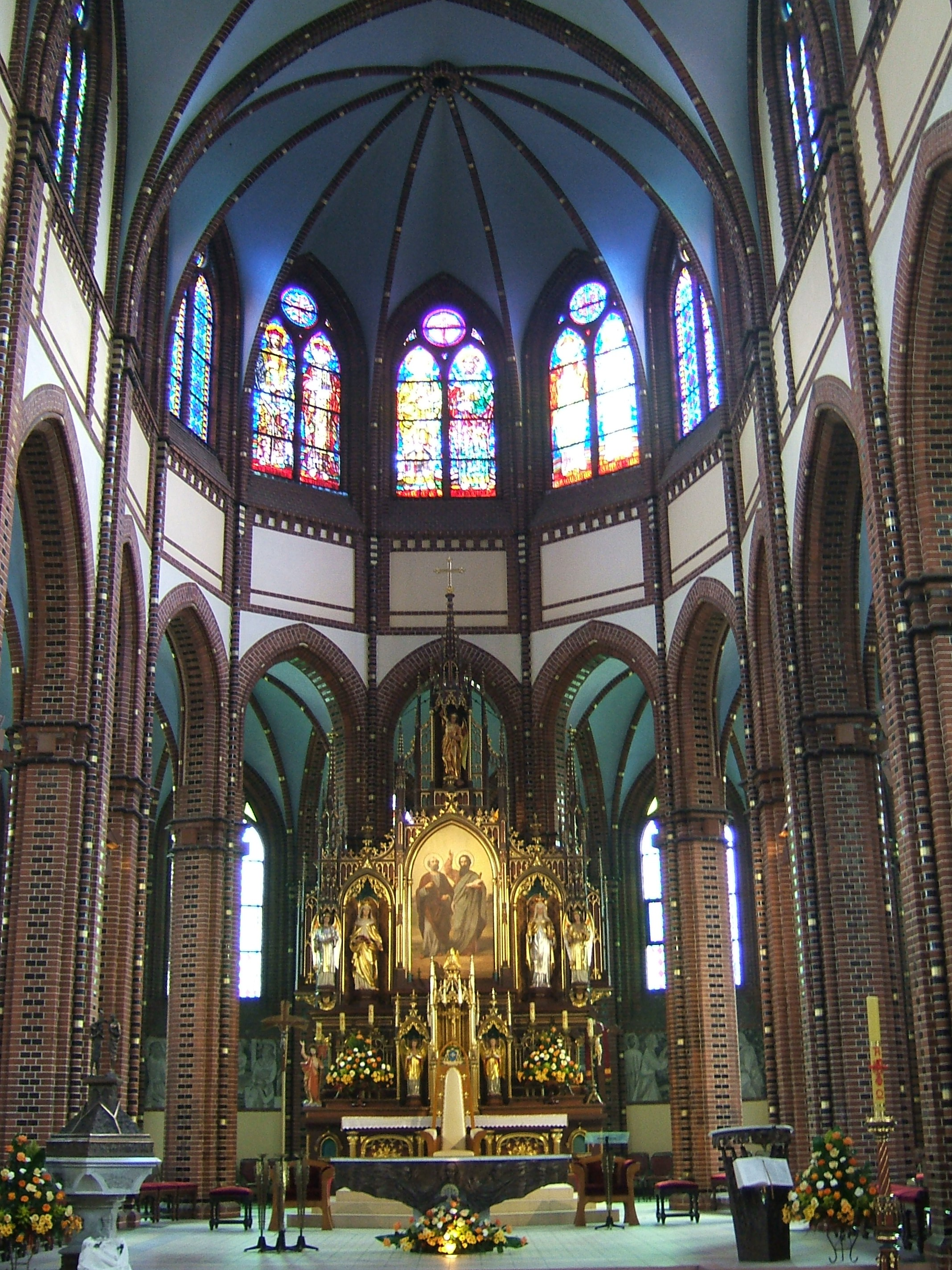
Brick Gothic at the Cathedral of Ss. Peter and Paul, Gliwice, Poland

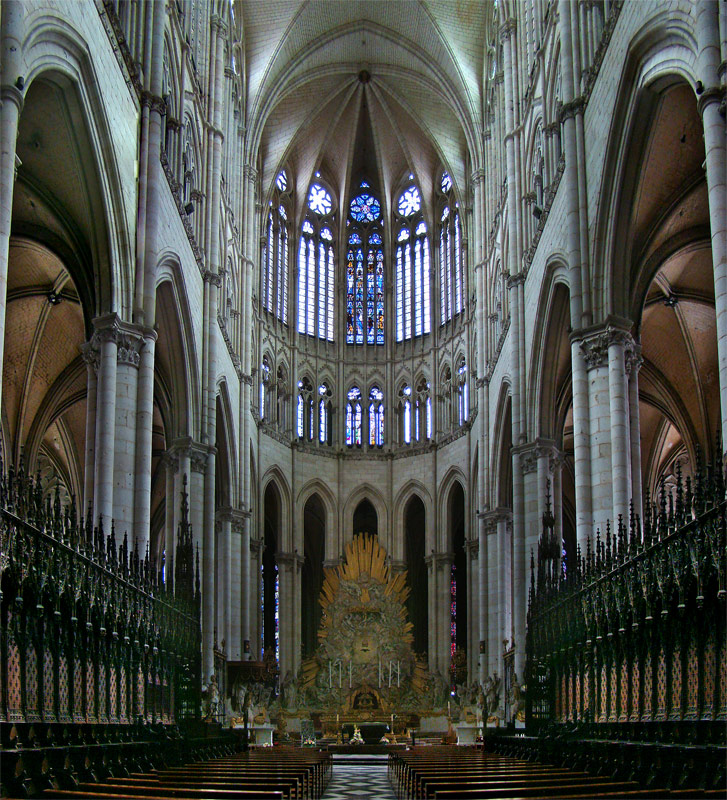
The Gothic choir at Amiens Cathedral, France

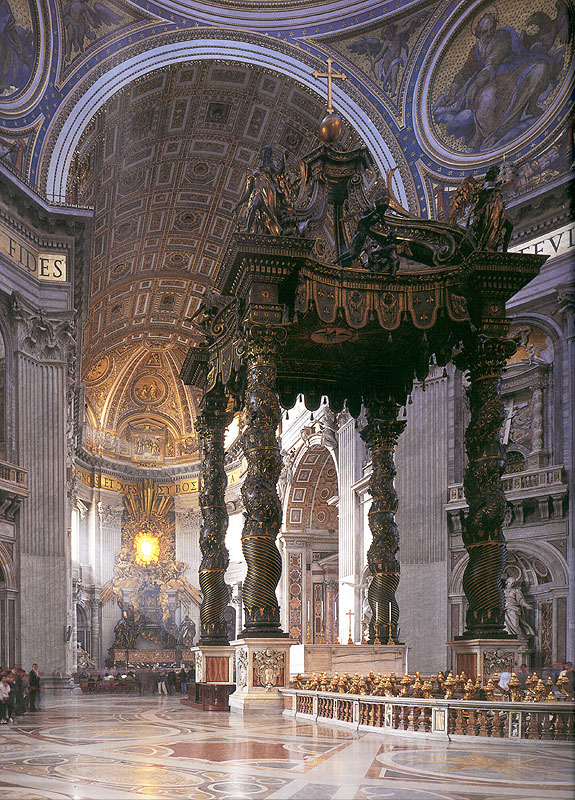
The choir and papal altar of St Peter's Basilica, Rome

==== Altar ====
The altar in the Roman Catholic church is the center of the church where the sacrifice on the cross is made present in sacramental form. Secondarily in the Catholic church, and primarily in other Christian denominations, the altar is a table on which is laid the Blessed Sacrament of bread and wine for consecration by a priest prior to use in the rite of Communion. The main altar in a church is located in a designated space called the "chancel" or "sanctuary" ("holy place"). The word has passed into modern English with an altered meaning because a criminal who could gain access to this area without capture was thereby given the sanctuary of the church. Many churches have an additional altar placed further forward in the church, as well as altars in chapels. The altar of a Catholic church may be made of stone, often marble. In most Protestant churches altars are of wood, symbolic of the table of the Last Supper rather than of a sacrificial altar, and may be called the Communion table.

The sanctuary is often separated from the body of the church by railings and screens, and, in the case of Orthodox and Byzantine Catholic churches, by an iconostasis which forms a complete visual as well as physical barrier. The sanctuary is usually the most ornately decorated part of a church, creating a visual focus towards the altar. This might be done in several ways. There might be a carved or painted altarpiece, a large carved screen called a reredos, or a structure called a ciborium which form a canopy over the altar. In English churches that have a square eastern end, a very large stained glass "east window" often fills the wall behind the altar; examples still with medieval glass include York Minster, Gloucester Cathedral and St Margaret's, Westminster.

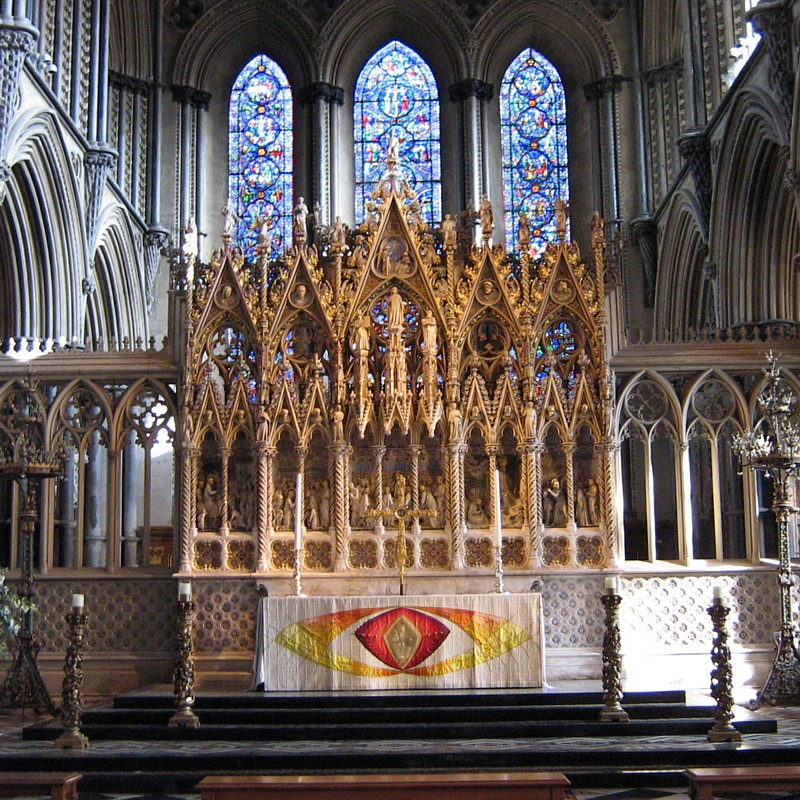
The Gothic Revival reredos at Ely Cathedral, England, with east window behind

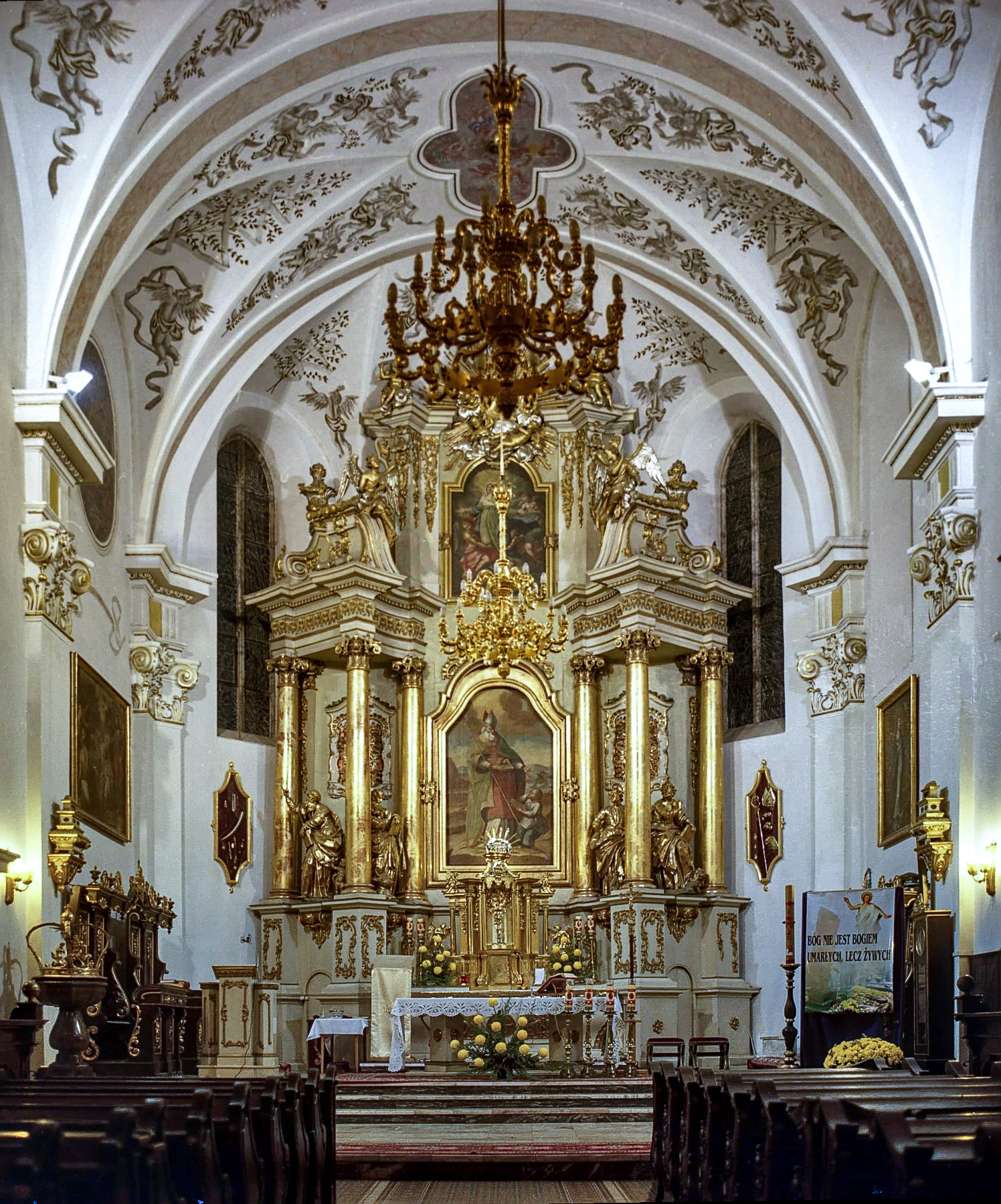
The Baroque altarpiece at St Nicolaus Basilica, Bochnia, Poland.

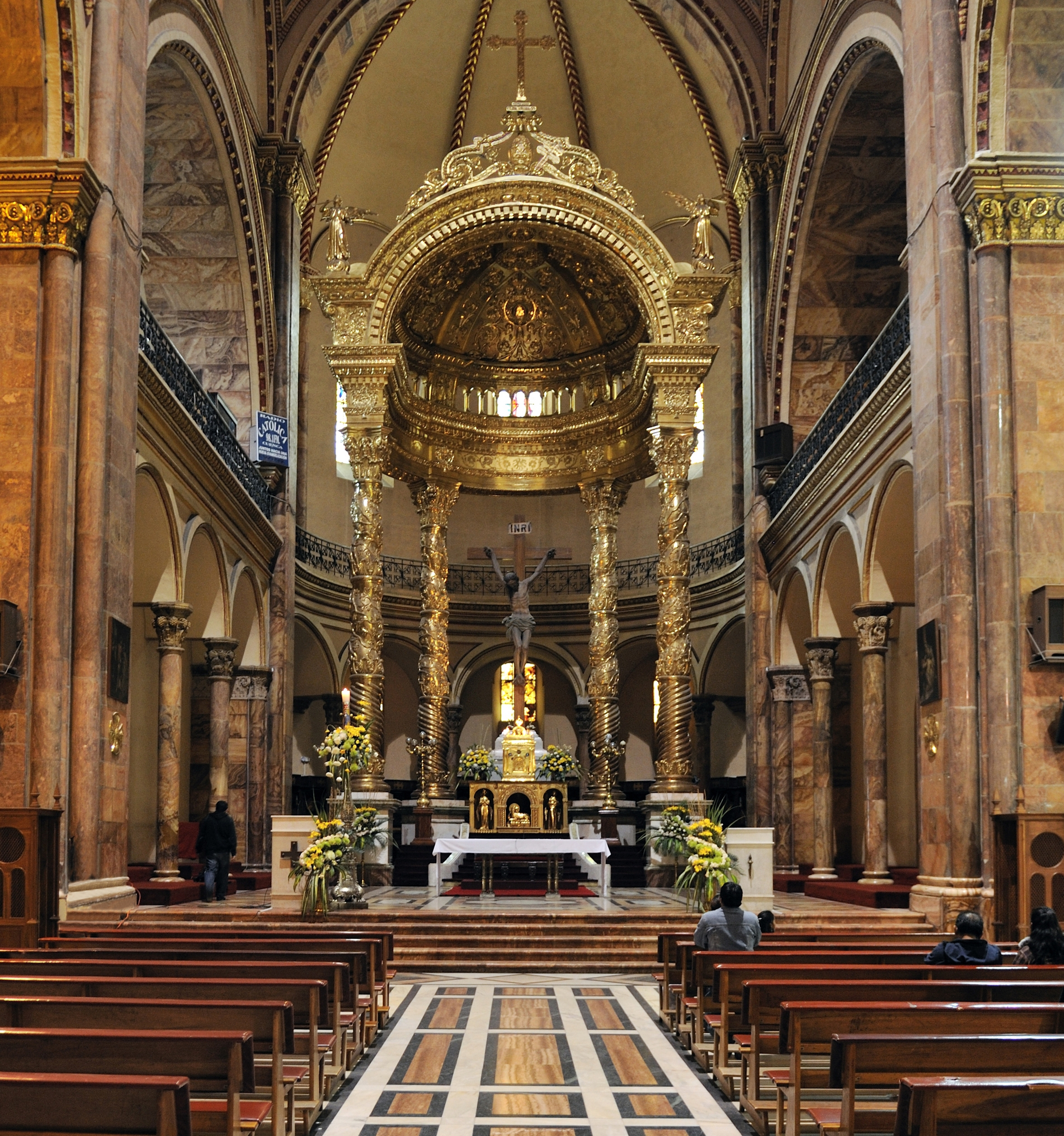
The Neo-Baroque ciborium in the Catedral Nueva, Cuenca, Ecuador

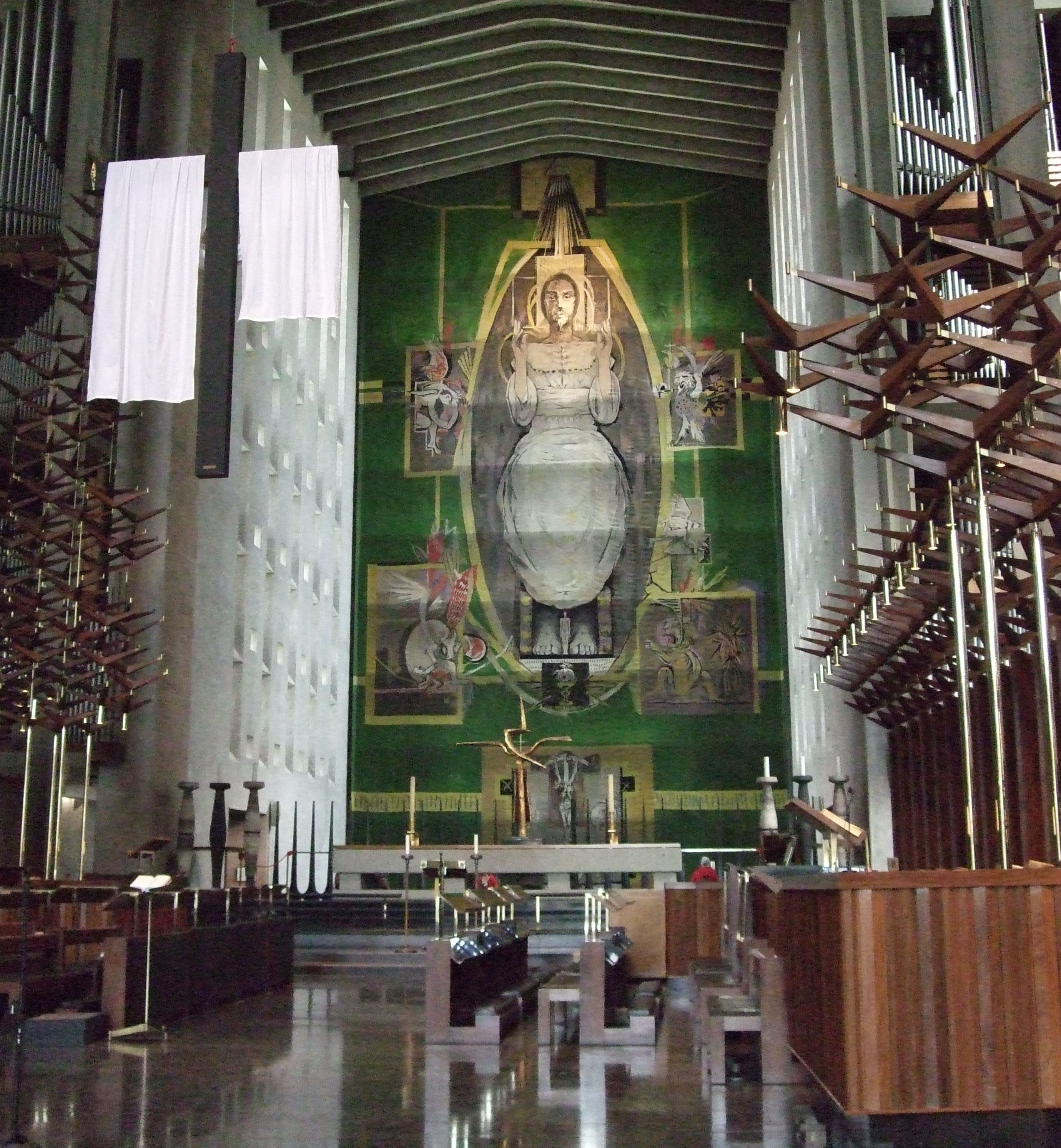
Tapestry by Graham Sutherland in Coventry Cathedral, England

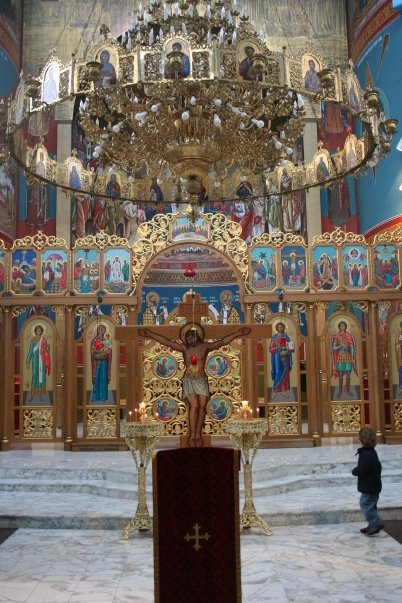
Contemporary Iconostasis in the Ukrainian Greek Catholic Church, Chicago United States

==== Choir stalls and organ ====
The term "choir" is used in two distinct ways in relation to cathedrals. It firstly means the choir of "choristers", often men and boys, that sing at the services; in medieval cathedrals, and sometimes still, the boys from a special choir school. It is also the term used for that section of the church where the choir sits and stands to sing in services. In a cathedral or large church, there may be fixed seating in this area, called choir stalls which also provided seating for the cathedral clergy and some congregation. The choir stalls are often richly carved and decorated. The bishop's throne or cathedra is often located in this space. The choir may be separated from the nave by a highly decorated screen of wood or stone.

The organ which provides music and accompanies the choir may be located on the screen, or may be in the gallery above the choir, or in a transept. Some churches have an organ loft at the west end of the church. These are usually a later addition to medieval churches; large examples had portative organs, often several.

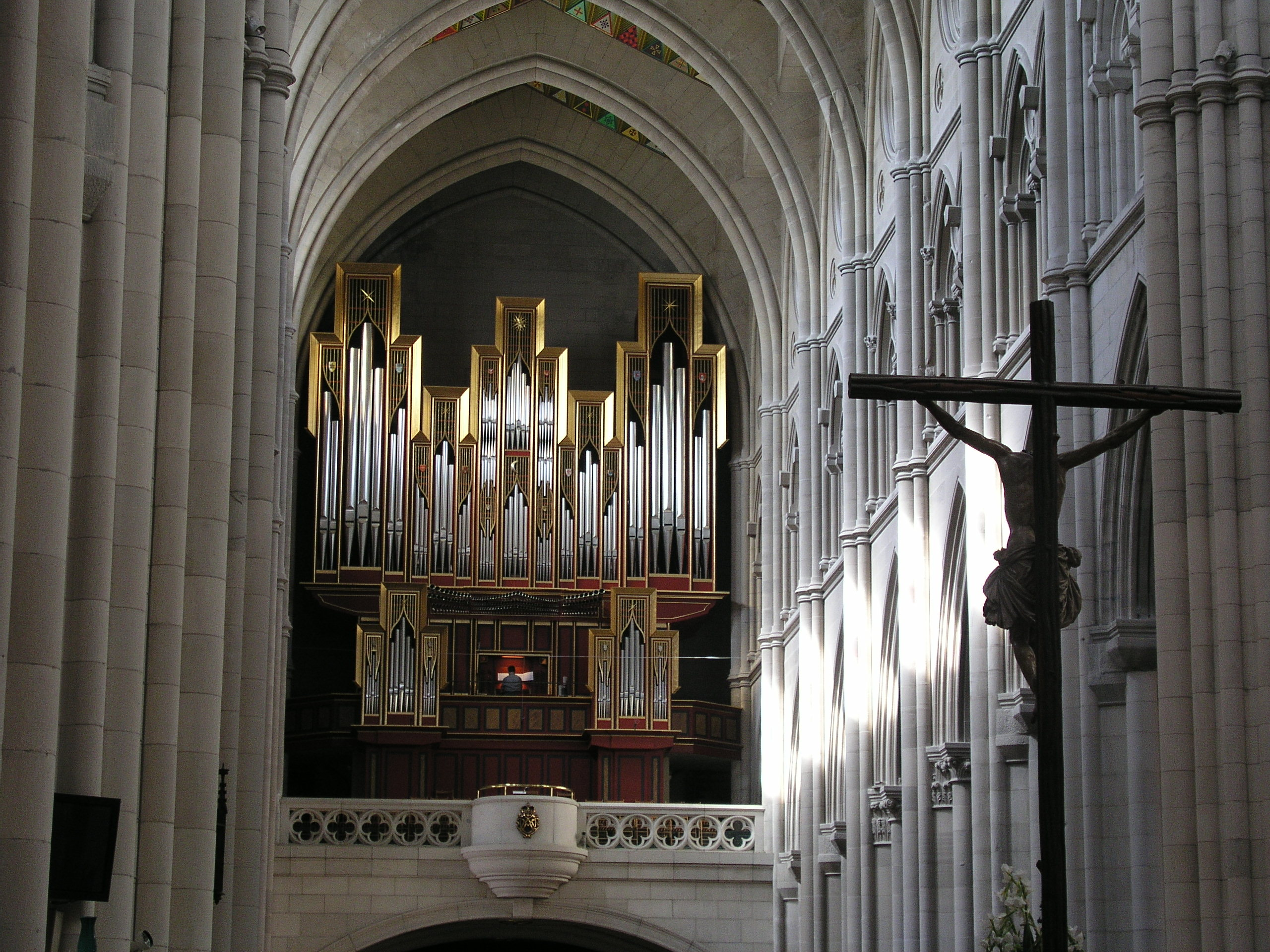
Organ in the Almudena Cathedral, Madrid, Spain

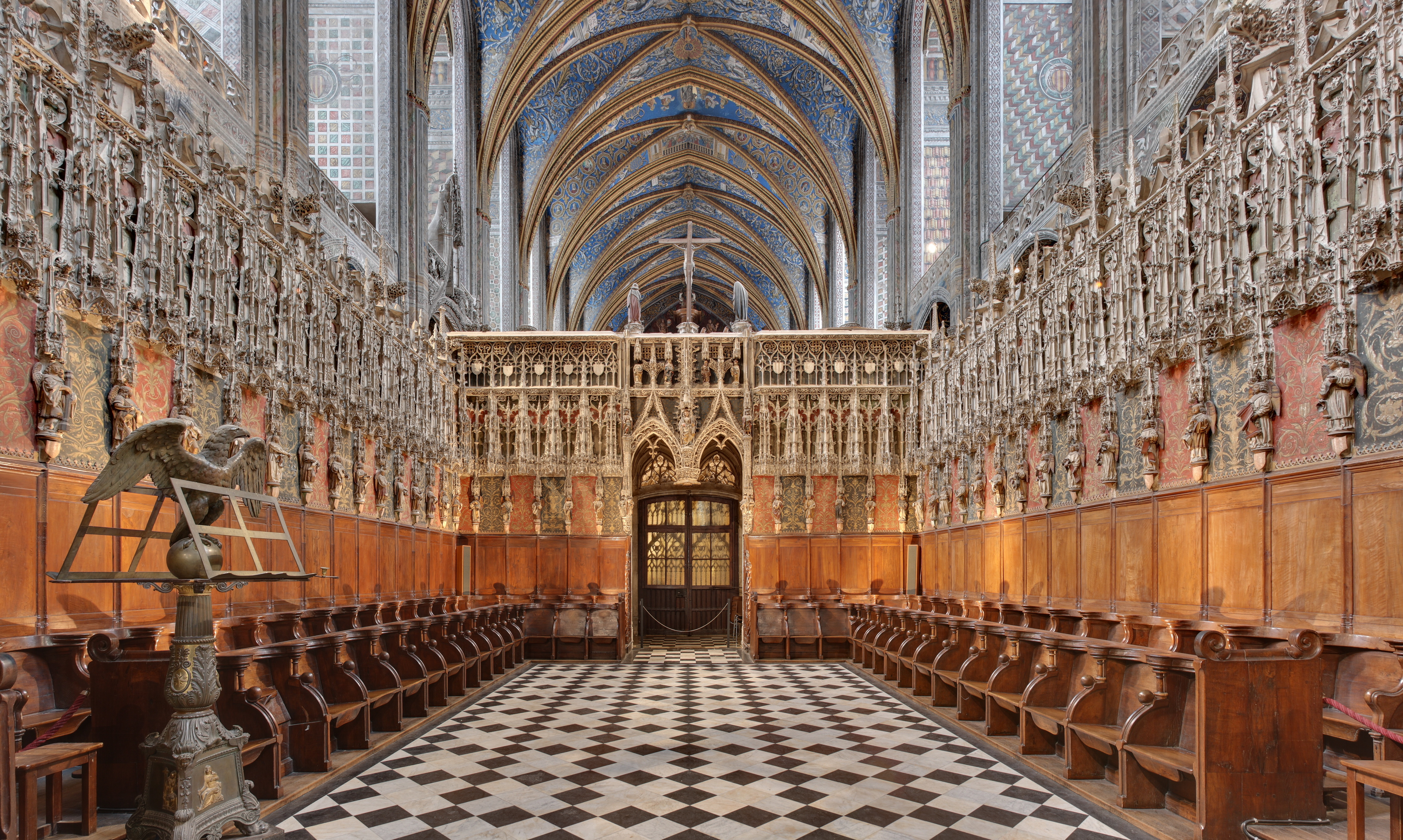
The choirstalls, screen and lectern of Albi Cathedral, France

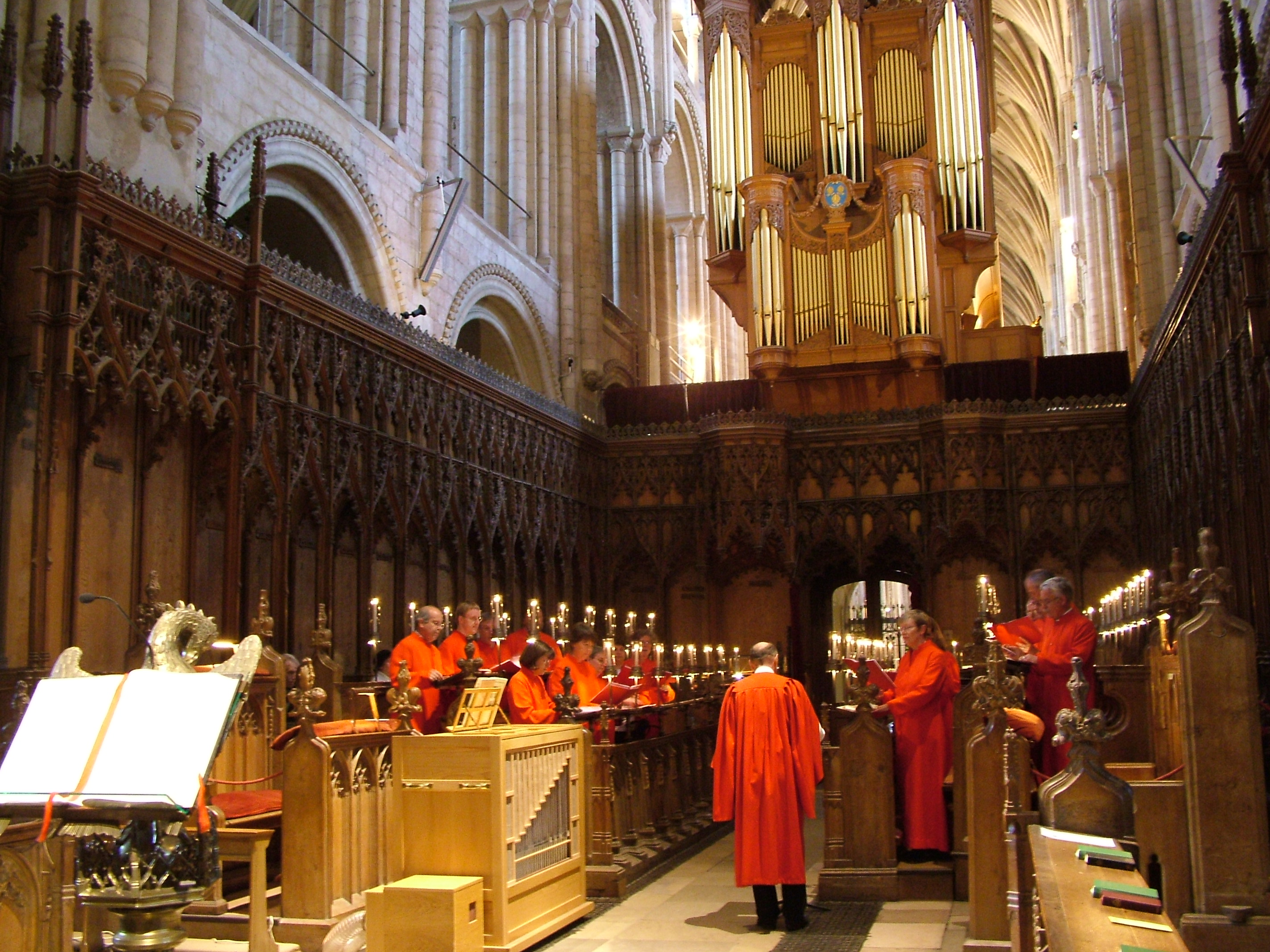
A choir practising in Norwich Cathedral, England

==== Font, lectern and pulpit ====
Towards the western end of the nave stands the font, or water basin at which the rite of Baptism is performed. It is placed towards the door because the Baptism signifies entry into the community of the church. Standing to the front of the nave is a lectern from which the Holy Scripture is read. In many churches this takes the form of an eagle which supports the book on its outstretched wings and is the symbol of John the Evangelist.

The third significant furnishing of the nave is the pulpit or rostrum from which the sermon is preached and the biblical readings are expounded. The pulpit might be of marble or wood, and may be a simple structure or represent a highly elaborate carved sermon. It is often decorated with the winged figures of a man, a lion, a bull and an eagle, representing the Gospel writers, Matthew, Mark, Luke and John.

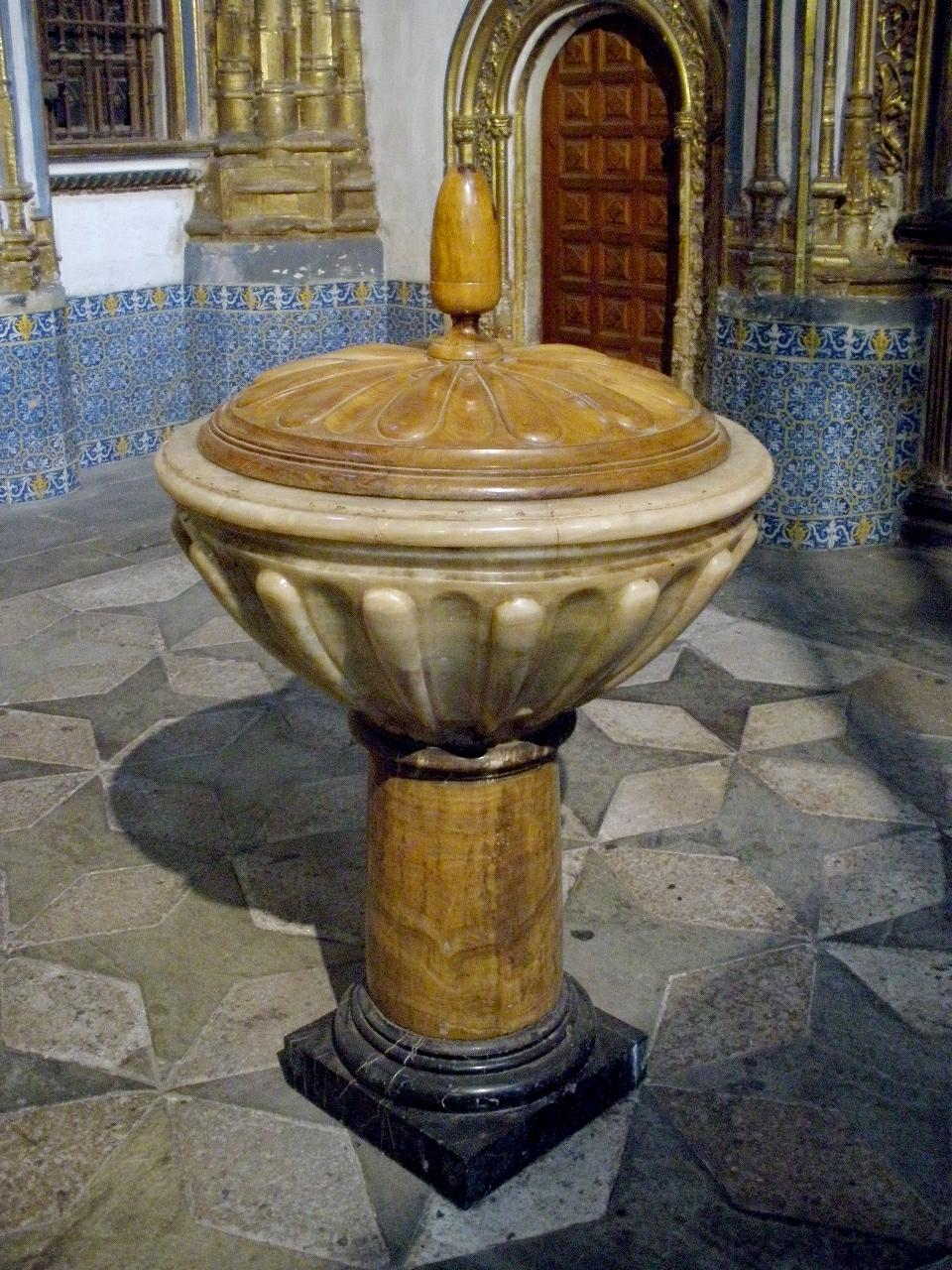
Font at Salamanca Cathedral, Spain

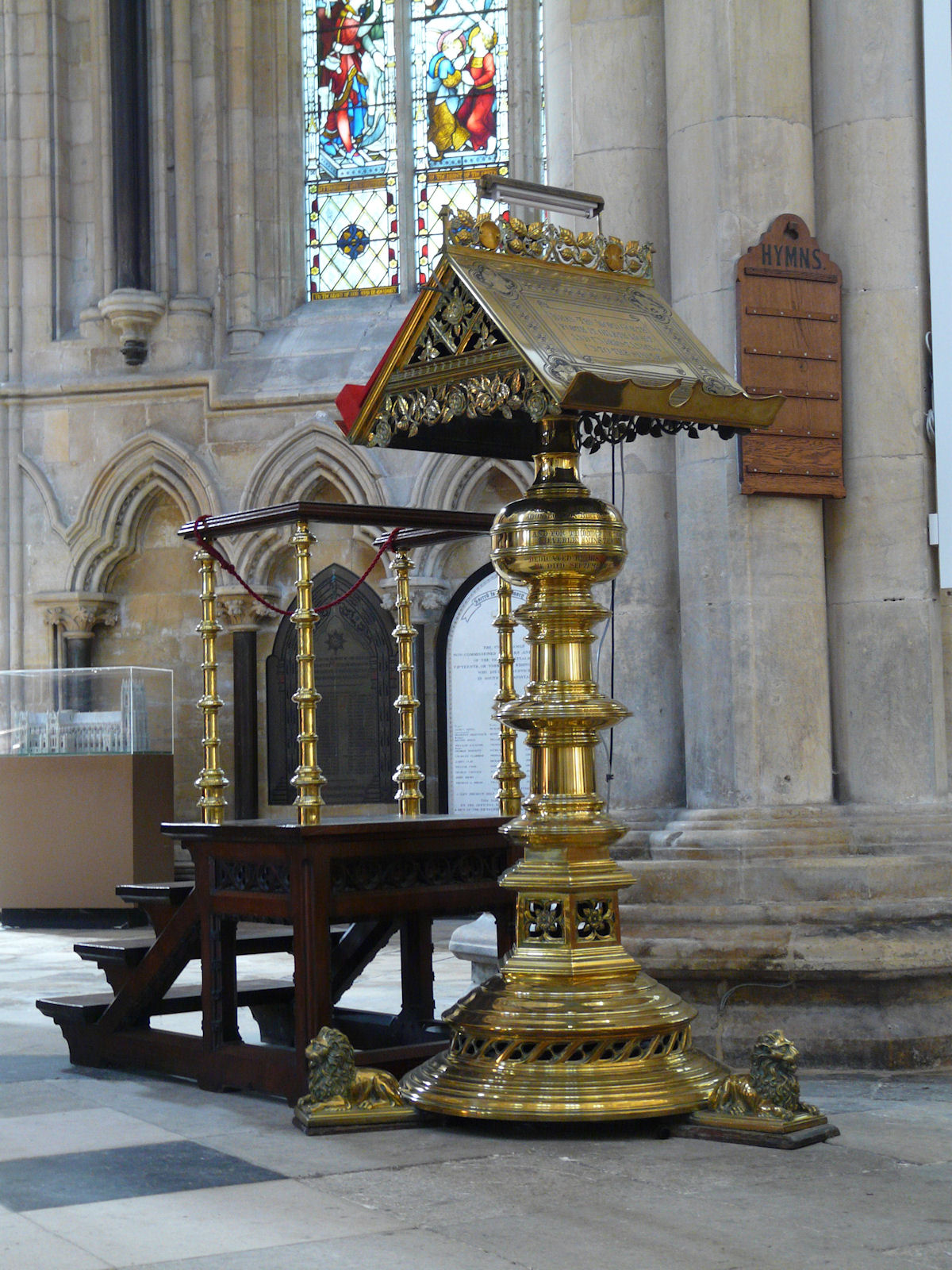
Lectern at Beverley Minster, England

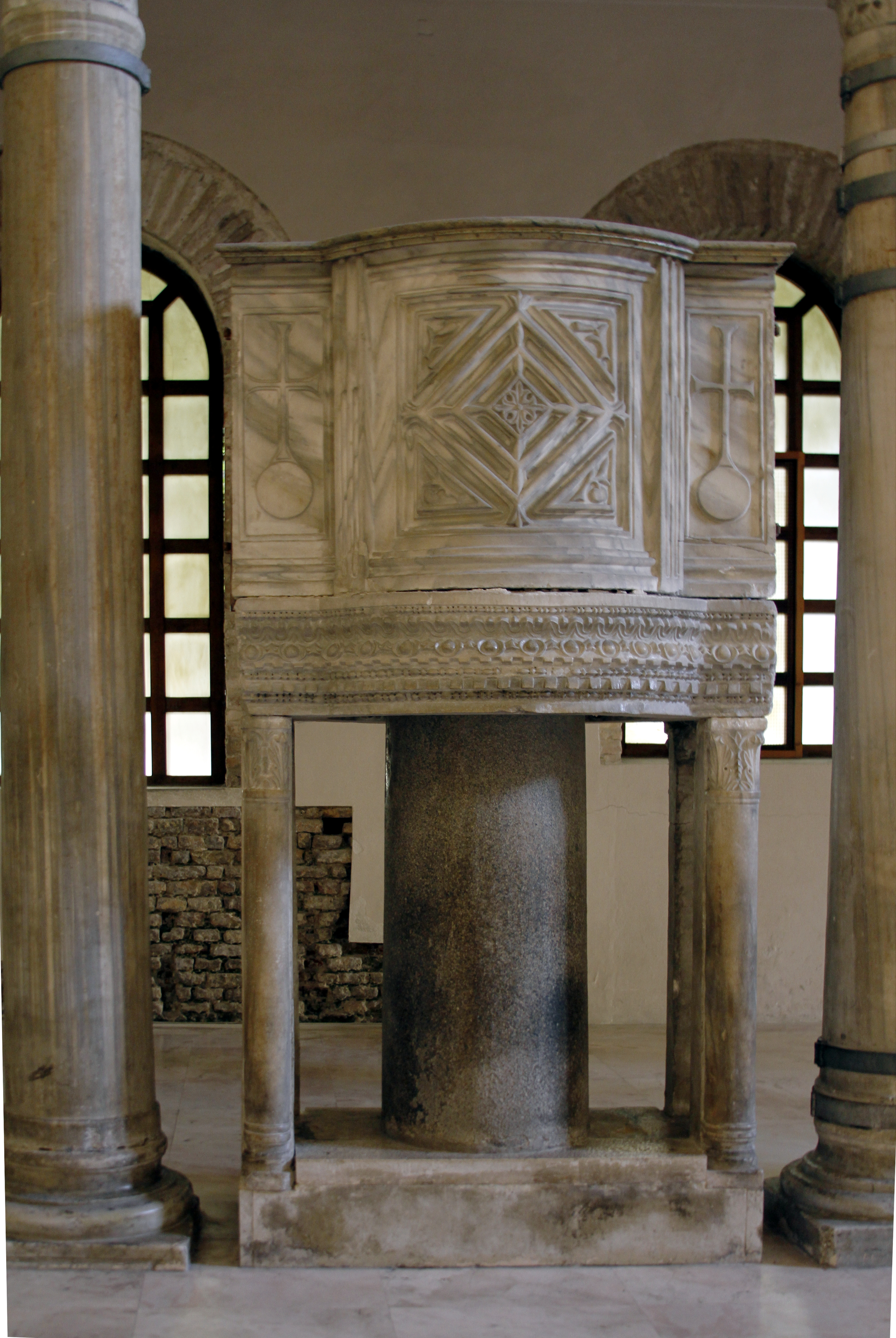
Ambo for reading the Gospel at Sant'Apollinare Nuovo, Ravenna

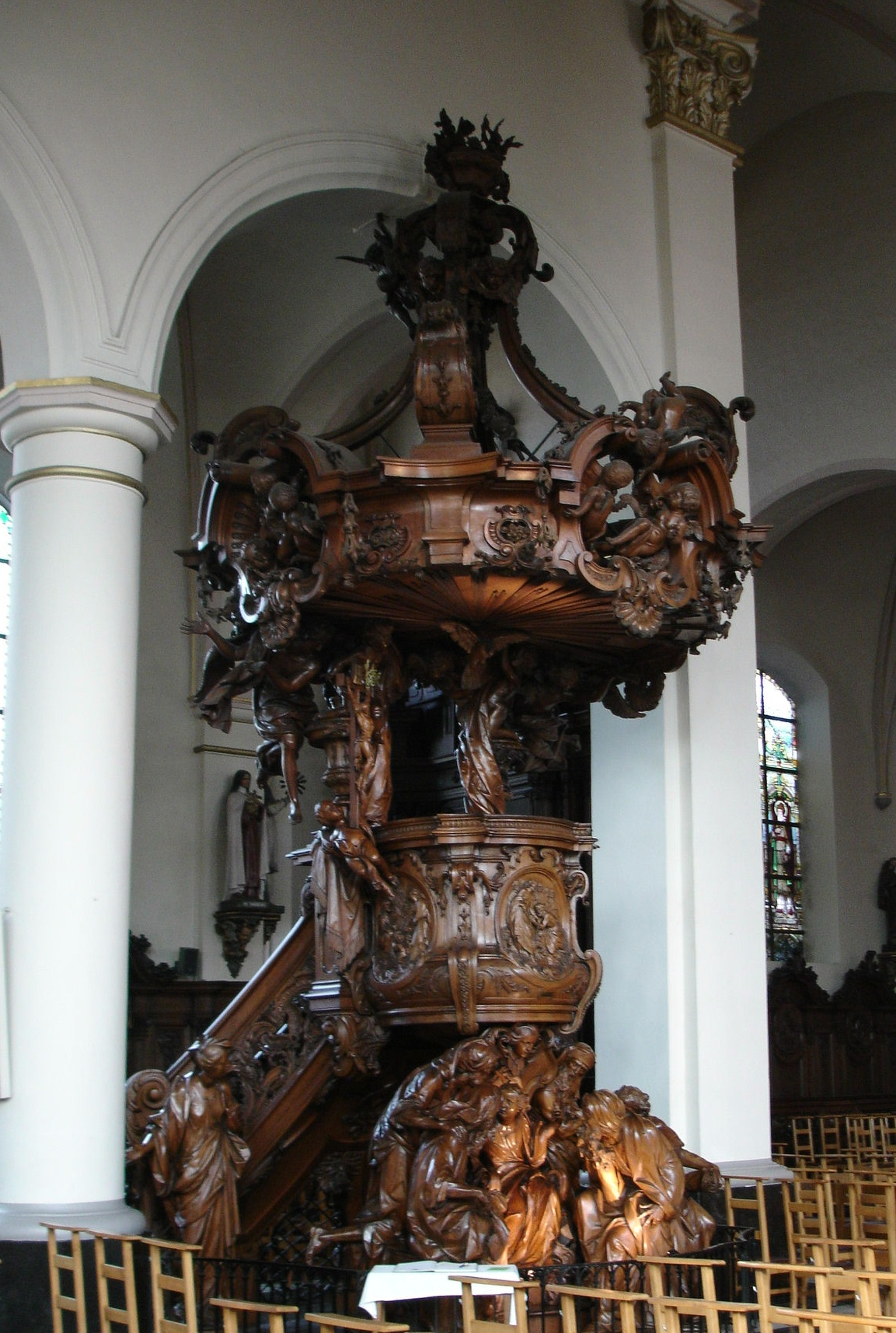
Pulpit at the Church of St Laurentius, Lokeren, Belgium

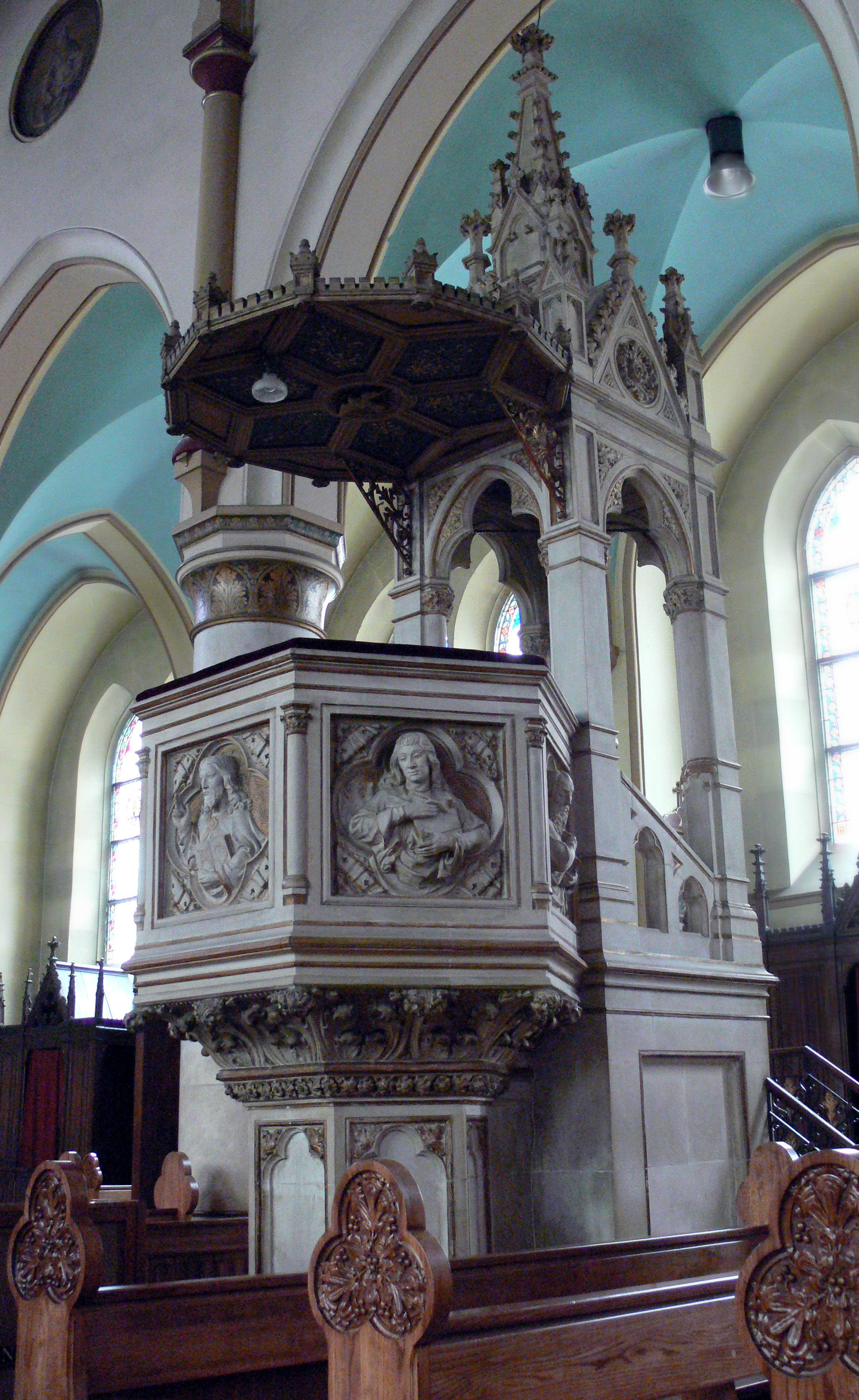
Pulpit at Sarajevo Cathedral, Bosnia and Herzegovina

==== Decoration ====
The internal decorative features of a cathedral or great church might follow a carefully conceived scheme which might continue the theme begun on the west front. There are many examples which give evidence of this, and include the mosaic vaults of Orthodox churches, the stained glass windows of Medieval churches and the sculptural schemes of Baroque churches. However, in many other cases, any unified scheme has been lost with the vagaries of the building's history.

Despite losses and changes of direction, the over-riding aim in the decoration of church interiors is to convey the message of the Gospels. To this end, many churches have, in their decorative schemes, elements of a Poor Man's Bible, illustrating aspects of the Life of Christ and other related narratives, with the aim of educating the viewer. Among these representations are the Stations of the Cross and the Crucifix which was traditionally suspended from the chancel arch, or placed on a rood screen at the entrance to the quire. Other figurative representations include sculptures or pictures of saints and prophets, which are the common subject of the panel paintings on the iconostasis of Orthodox Churches.

The symbolism used in ancient churches is not always easy for modern people to read. Virtues and vices may be represented by small figures with particular attributes, or by animals that were thought to embody a particular quality. A common example is the pelican which was thought to peck its breast to feed its young on the blood, thus representing the love of Christ for the Church.

The decorative scheme generally culminated at the altar, where there would be a painted altarpiece or sculptured reredos, or it would be framed by a stained glass window, or an apsidal mosaic.

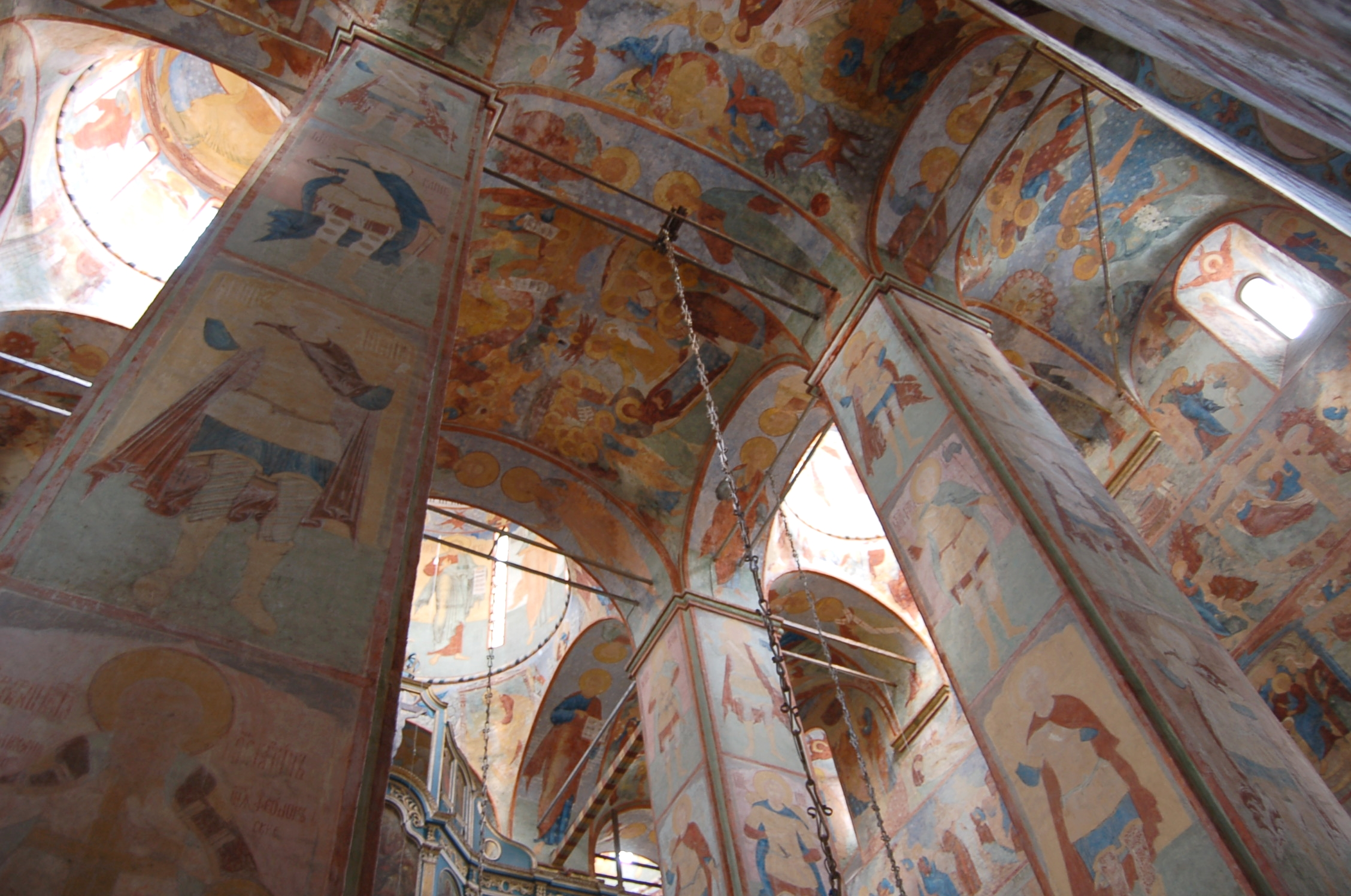
The interior of Vologda Cathedral, Russia, is painted with murals.

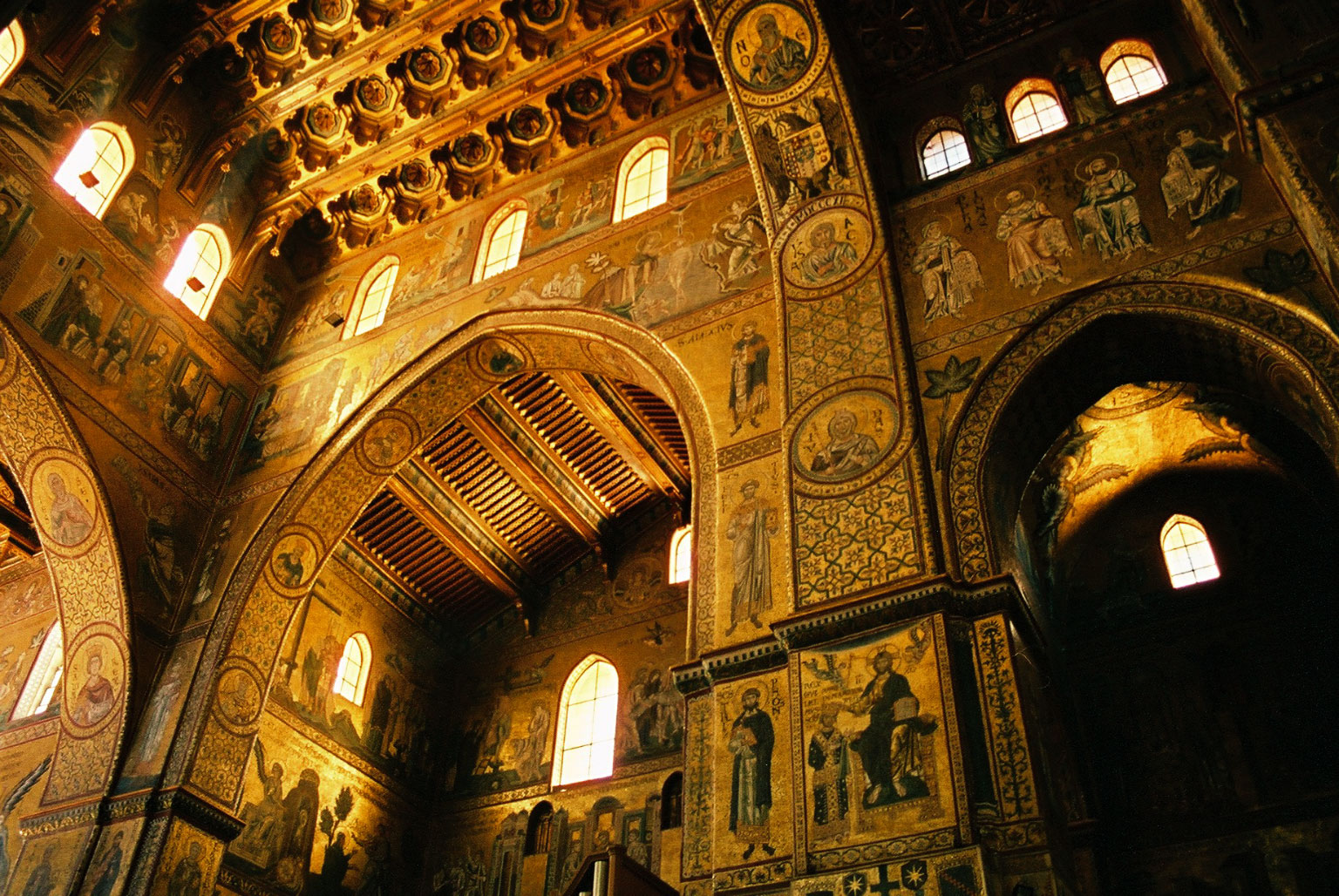
Monreale Cathedral, Sicily, is decorated with mosaics in the Byzantine manner.

== Architectural style ==
=== Early Christian ===
The period of architecture termed Early or Paleo-Christian lasted from the first Christian Church buildings of the early 4th century until the development of a distinctly Byzantine style which emerged in the reign of Justinian I in the 6th century, foundation of Constantinople by Constantine in 330 CE. Some of the earliest Christian churches were constructed by the Arsacid dynasty of Armenia, where king Tiridates III converted to Christianity in 301. The small aisleless Kasagh Basilica at Aparan in the Kingdom of Armenia is traditionally dated to the 4th or 5th century.

Large Early Christian churches generally took the form of aisled basilicas with an apse. Among the early larger churches in Rome the Basilica of Santa Maria Maggiore has retained much of its original internal arrangement, its vast basilical proportions, its simple apsidal end, its great colonnade supporting a straight cornice rather than arches and some very early mosac decoration. Santa Sabina, also in Rome, exemplifies the simplicity of architectural decoration that characterized many of the early Christian basilicas. Other important churches of this period are the two ancient circular churches of Rome, The Basilica of Santa Costanza and San Stefano Rotondo. These churches are marked by their formal application of the Roman architectural orders in their columns, with Ionic capitals supporting the lintel at Santa Maria Maggiore, Corinthian and Composite capitals at Santa Sabina and Santa Costanza, and all three orders at San Stefano. At Santa Costanza the thick brick walls of the central tambour are supported on slim elegant columns that are paired to give extra strength, each pair supporting a small section of cornice from which the arches spring.

A number of Rome's churches have retained Early Christian mosaics. Those at Santa Costanza are similar to mosaics and painted decoration found in public and domestic interiors, being largely geometric or floral, but close examination reveals much Christian symbolism in the choice of motives. One of the most extensive decorative schemes from the period to have remained at least partially intact is that at Santa Maria Maggiore, where the proscenium of the apse is decorated with stories of the Infancy of Jesus drawn from the Gospel of Matthew.

The Anchiskhati Basilica is the oldest church in Georgia, dating from the 6th century.

Where churches of Early Christian foundation remain, they are mostly considerably altered, are badly deteriorated and no longer viable, or are roofless ruins, a state which almost overtook San Stefano, prior to a renovation in the 15th century. The 4th century Church of the Nativity in Bethlehem was rebuilt by Justinian I after a fire in the 6th century, but appears to have retained much of its original form, including its massive Roman colonnades. The Constantinian Church of the Holy Sepulchre, on the other hand, was demolished under the order of the Fatimid caliph Al-Hakim in 1009 so that what stands today is a total reconstruction.

The Euphrasian Basilica in Poreč, Croatia, was founded in 360 on the site of a house church and retaining part of its Roman pavement. Although renovated and decorated in the late 6th century, the church has retained Early Christian features, including the atrium. Several Early Christian churches exist in Syria and Armenia, mostly in a ruined state. These show Roman rather than Byzantine architectural features, but have a regional character distinct from those of Rome.

Early Christian churches in Rome

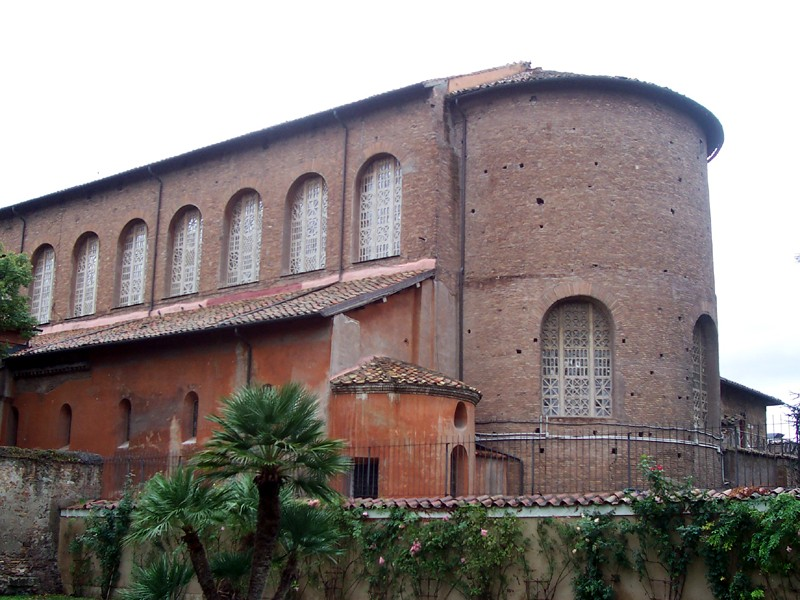
The Ancient Basilica of Santa Sabina, Rome (circa 425) has a typical basilical plan with a high semi-circular apse.

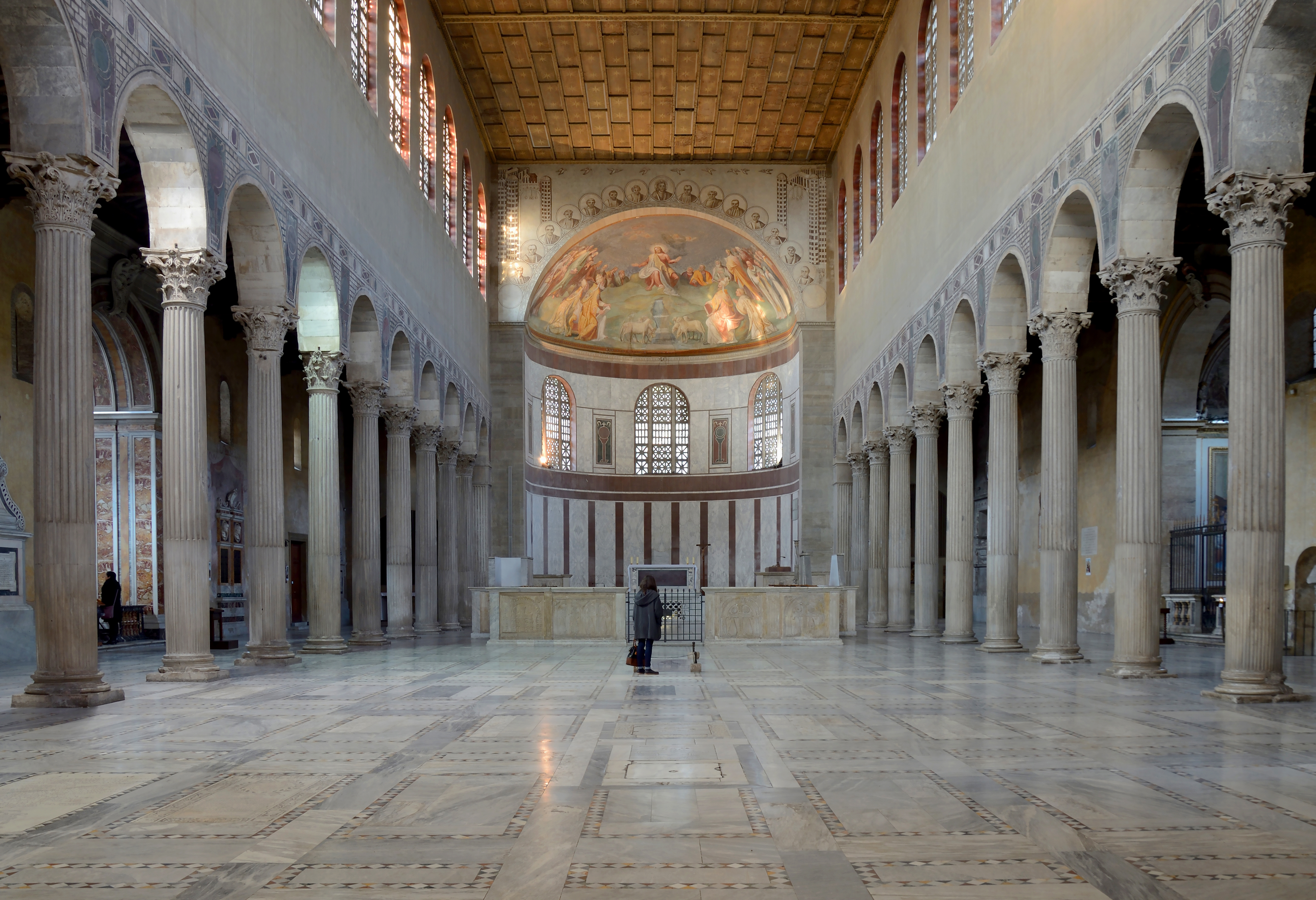
Internally, Santa Sabina appears little changed since Early Christian times.

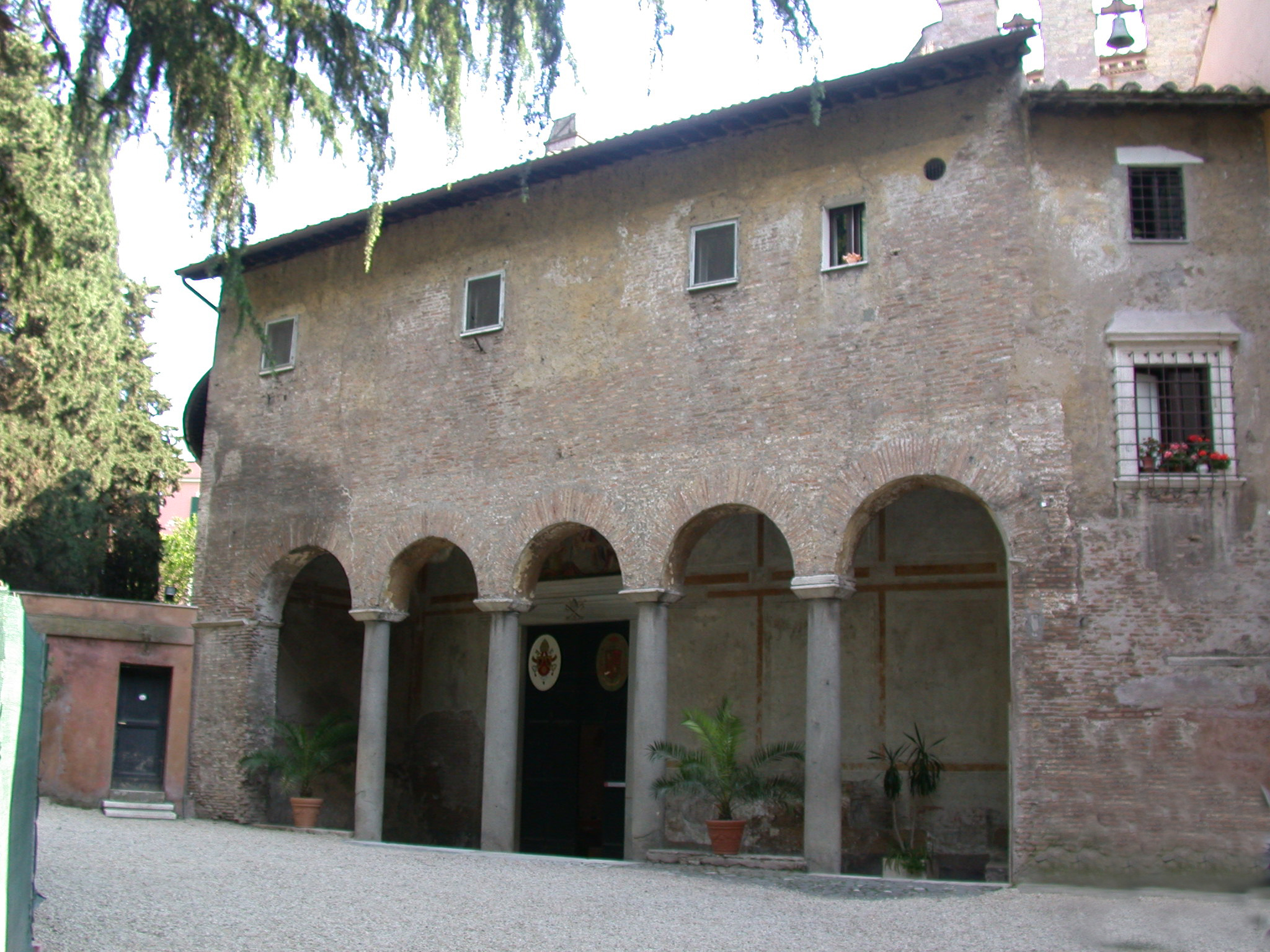
The Basilica of San Stefano Rotondo, Rome (circa 470) has lost the outer of its three arcades but retains the ancient core of the structure.
Early Christian church interiors

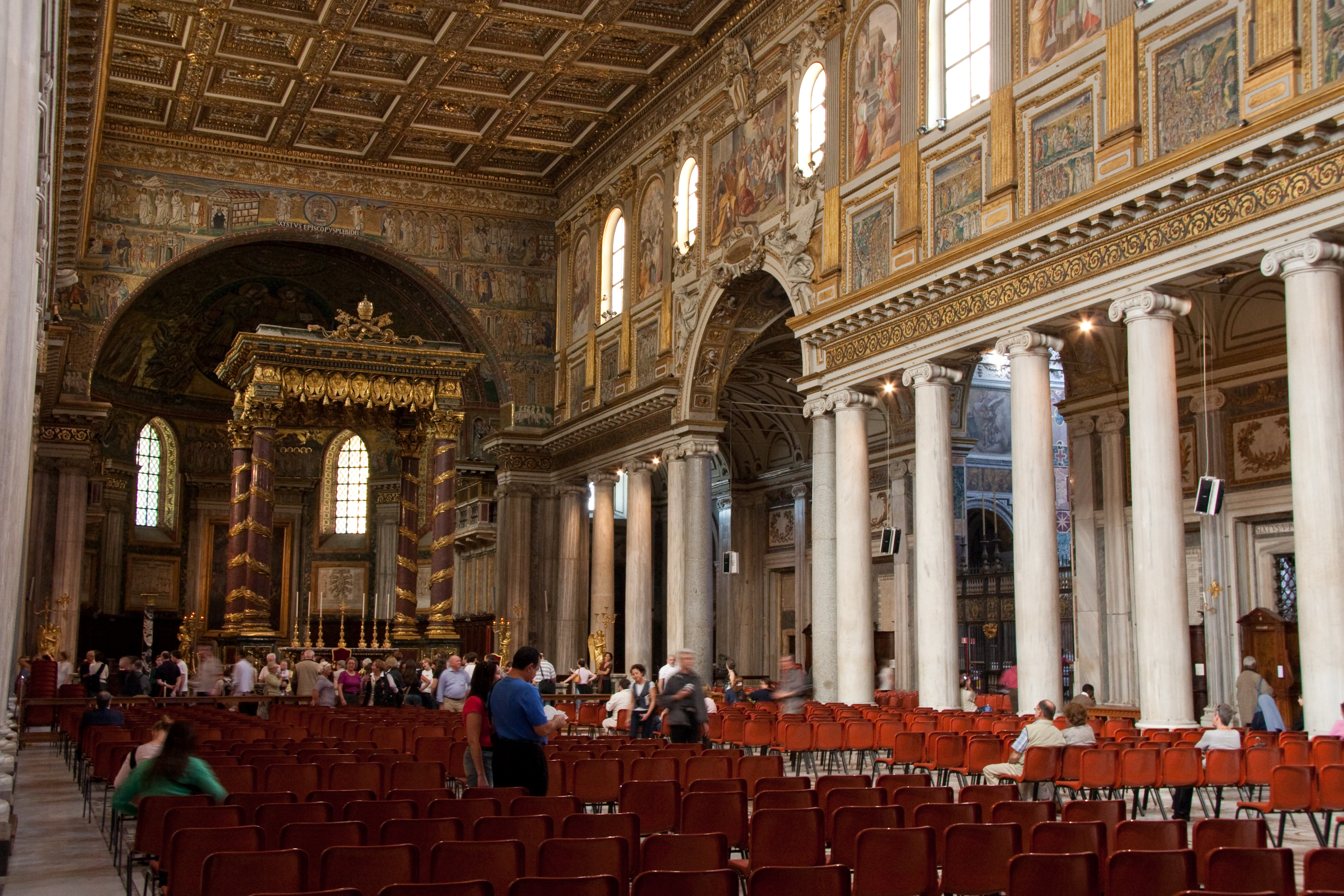
The Basilica of Santa Maria Maggiore, Rome. Its foundation dated by tradition to a miraculous snowfall in 352. Ancient mosaics are incorporated into Baroque decorations.

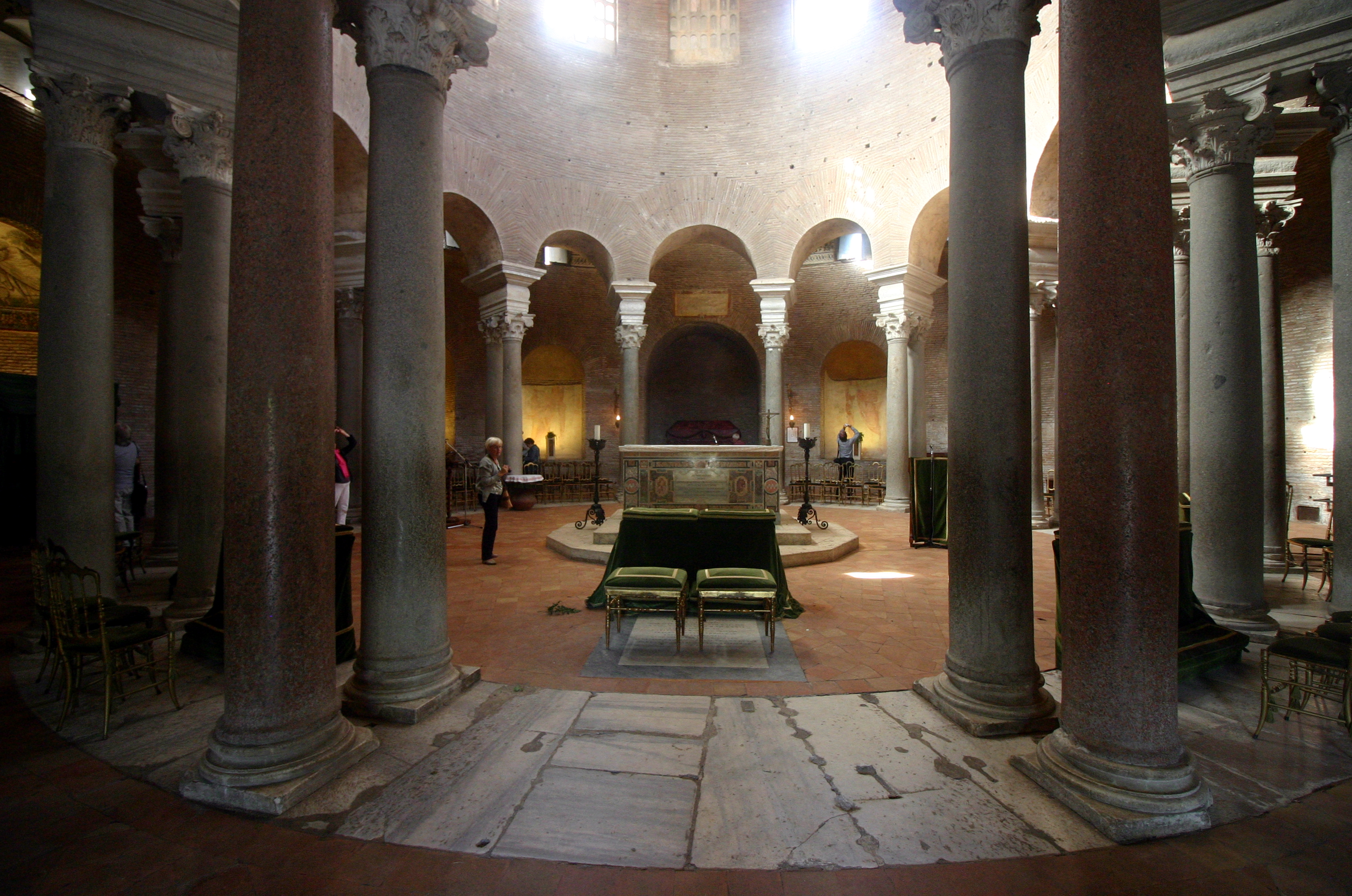
The Mausoleum of Santa Costanza, Rome (circa 350)

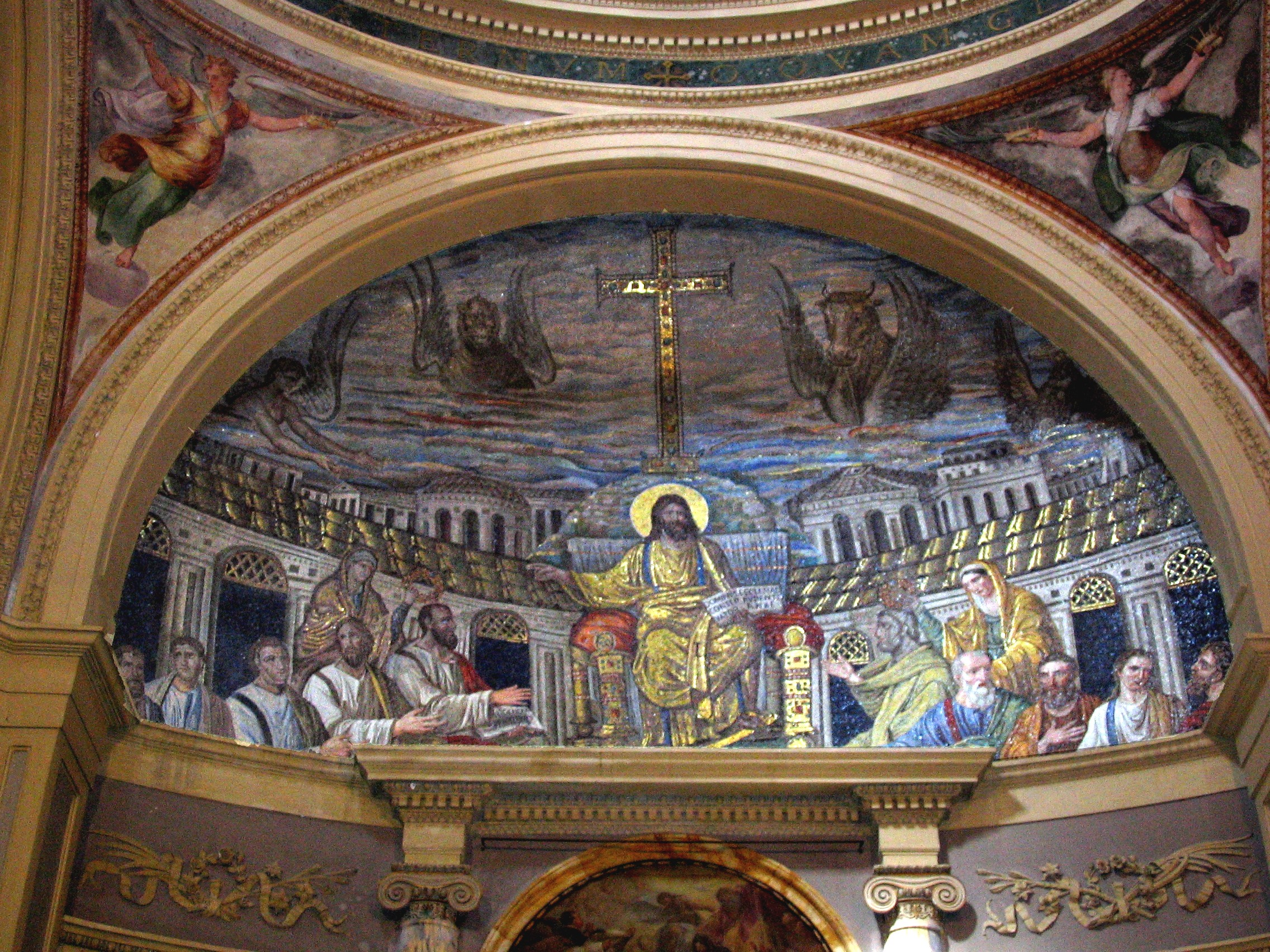
The Early Christian apse mosaic of Santa Pudenziana in Rome has been retained despite later renovations.

=== Byzantine ===
Ravenna, on the eastern coast of Italy, is home to several vast churches of basilica plan dating from the age of the Emperor Justinian (6th century CE). San Apollinare Nuovo is in plan similar to Santa Maria Maggiore, but the details of the carvings are no longer in the classical Roman style. The capitals are like fat lacy stone cushions. Many of the mosaics are intact.

In the same town stands the uniquely structured, centrally planned, and domed church of San Vitale, of the same date. Its main internal space is 25 m across. The central dome is surrounded by eight apsidal semi-domes like the petals of a flower. There is a complex arrangement of curving arcades on several levels which gives a spatial effect only equalled by the Baroque church of Santa Maria della Salute built a thousand years later a few miles north in Venice. San Vitale was to be imitated in the 9th century in a simplified form by Charlemagne at Aachen, Germany.

In Venice stands San Marco's, one of the world's best known Byzantine-style churches, dating mainly from the 11th-century and decorated over many centuries but maintaining its centrally planned Byzantine form. It is called St Mark's Basilica, not because it is of basilical shape, but because it has been awarded that title. It has a Greek Cross plan, a large dome being surrounded by four somewhat smaller ones. Its decoration, both inside and out, is typical of the Byzantine period in its lavish use of mosaics and polychrome marble veneers.

Byzantine building spanning six centuries

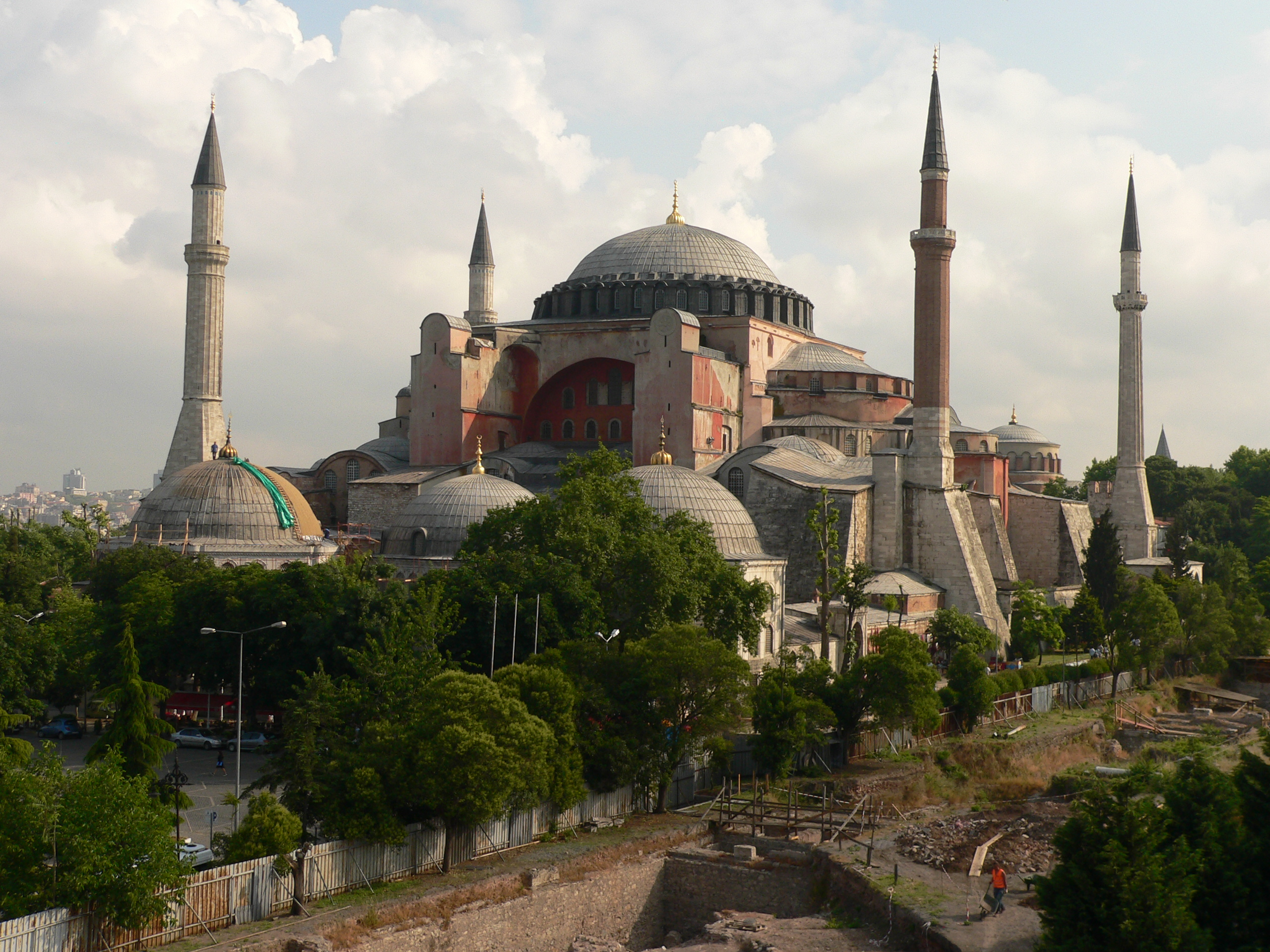
Hagia Sophia, Istanbul

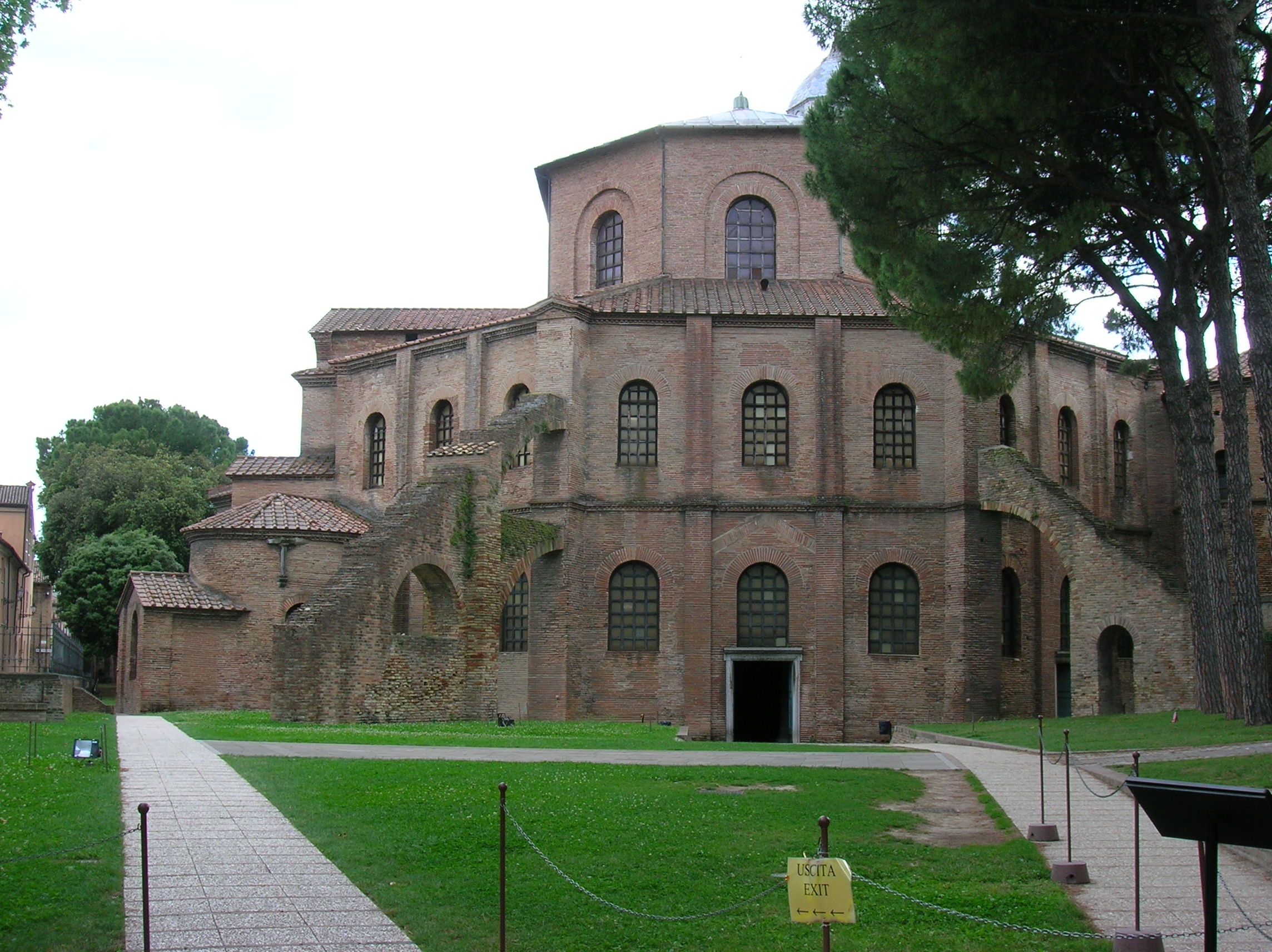
The Basilica of San Vitale, Ravenna

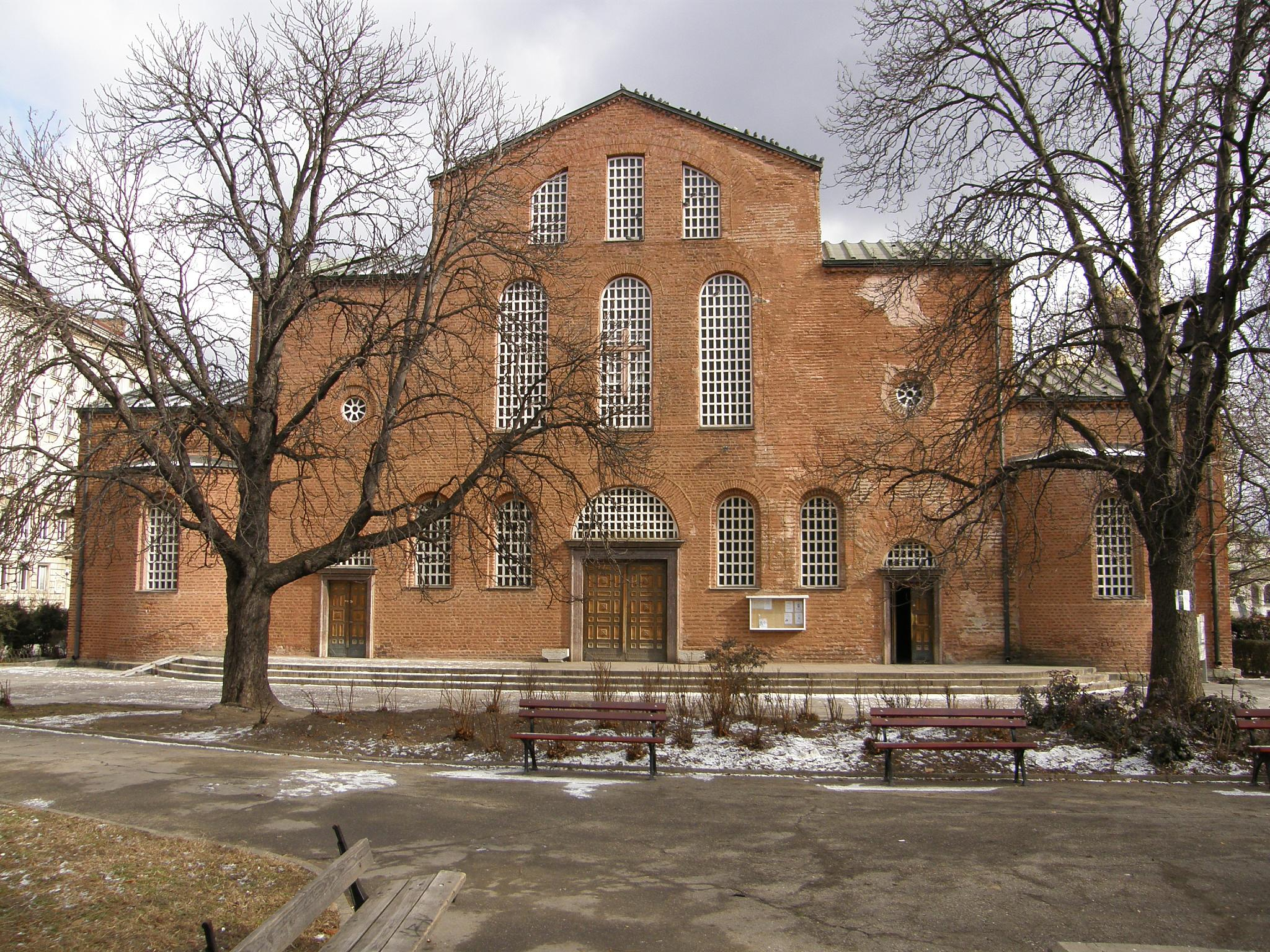
Basilica of Saint Sofia, Sofia

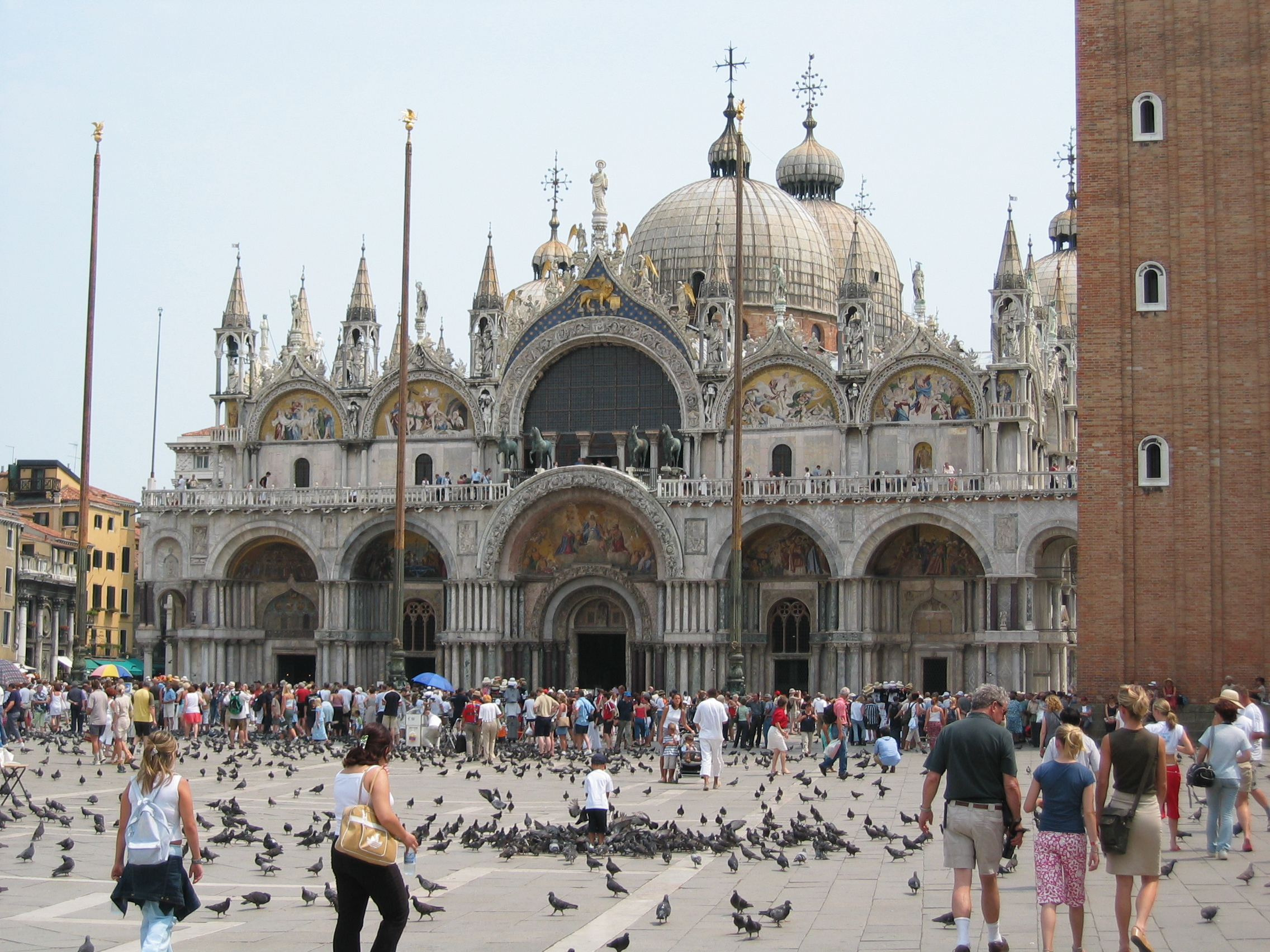
The Basilica of San Marco, Venice
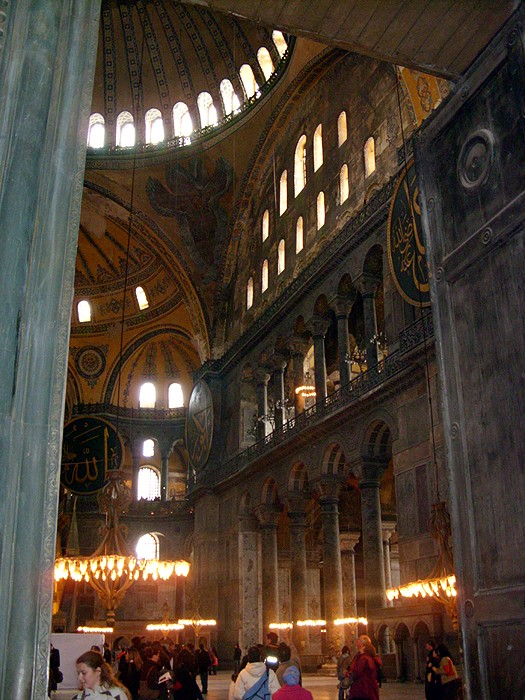
Hagia Sophia, though used as a mosque, retains some ancient mosaics.

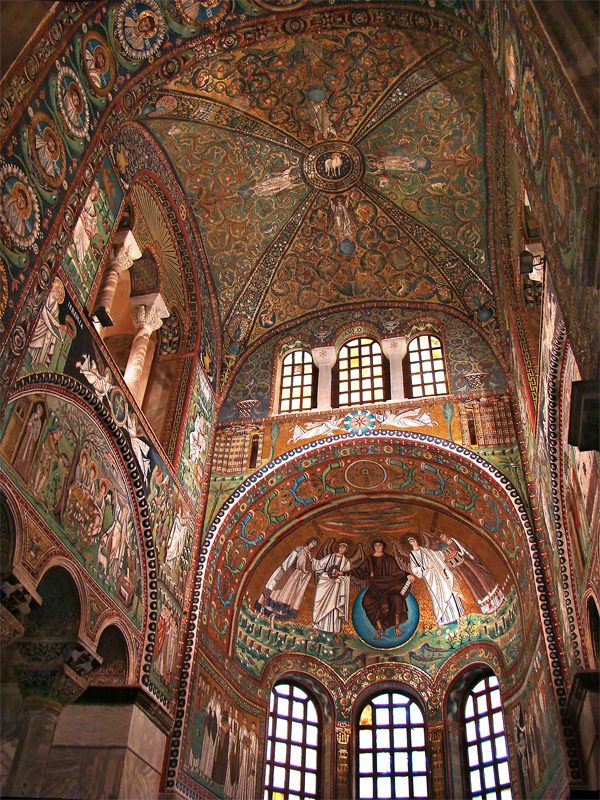
The apse of San Vitale showing the 6th century mosaics

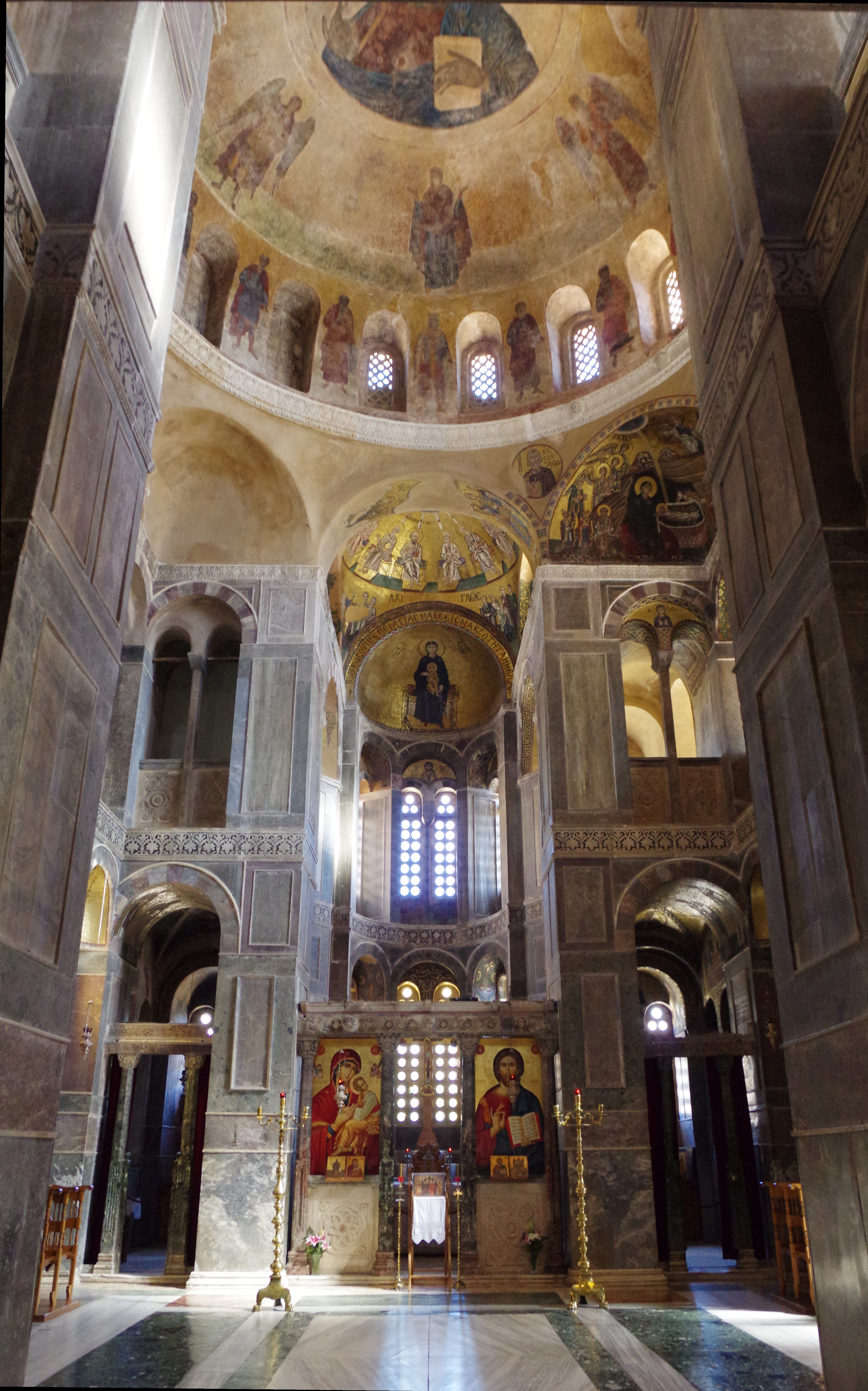
The Monastic Church of Hosios Loukas, Greece

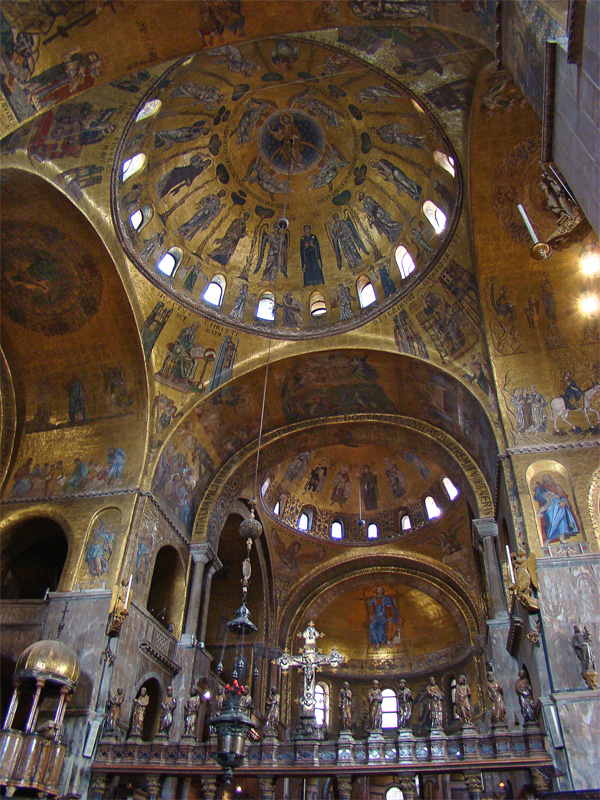
The glowing blue and gold mosaics of San Marco's, Venice

=== Romanesque ===
After the decline of the Roman Empire, the building of large churches in Western Europe gradually gained momentum with the spread of organised monasticism under the rule of Saint Benedict and others. A huge monastery at Cluny, only a fraction of which still exists, was built using a simplified Roman style, stout columns, thick walls, small window openings and semi-circular arches. The style spread with monasticism throughout Europe. The technique of building high vaults in masonry was revived. A treatment of decoration evolved that had elements drawn from local Pre-Christian traditions and incorporated zig-zags, spirals and fierce animal heads. The typical wall decorations were painted fresco murals. Romanesque building techniques spread to England at about the time of the Norman Conquest.

Representative of the period are Abbaye aux Hommes (the Abbey of the Men) in Caen, France; Worms Cathedral in Germany, the Cathedral of Pisa with its famous leaning campanile (bell tower), the Cathedral of Cefalù, Modena Cathedral and Parma Cathedral in Italy, and Durham Cathedral and Peterborough Cathedral in England.

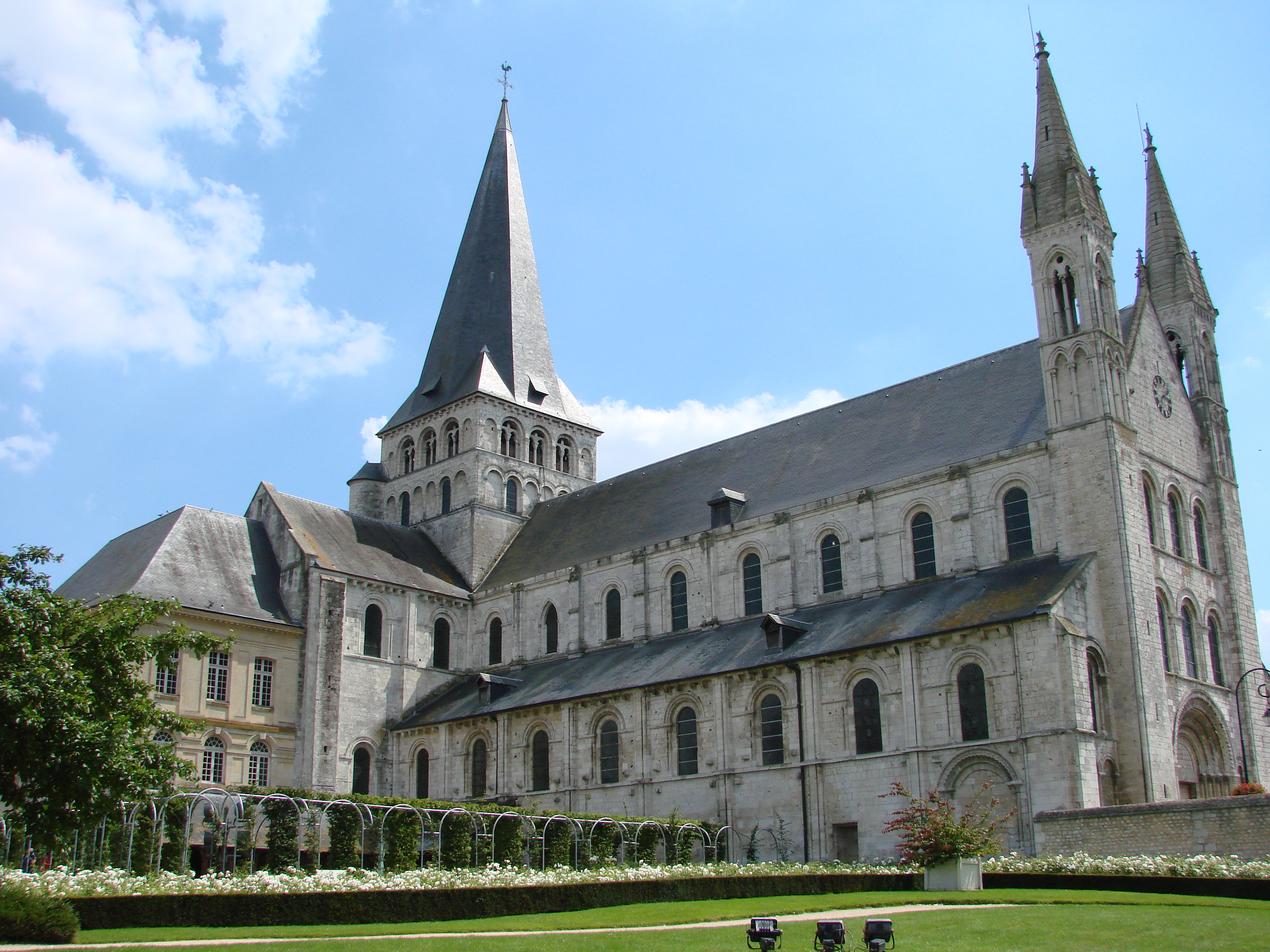
Saint-Georges de Boscherville Abbey, France, has a square tower over the crossing. The western pinnacles are in the Gothic style.

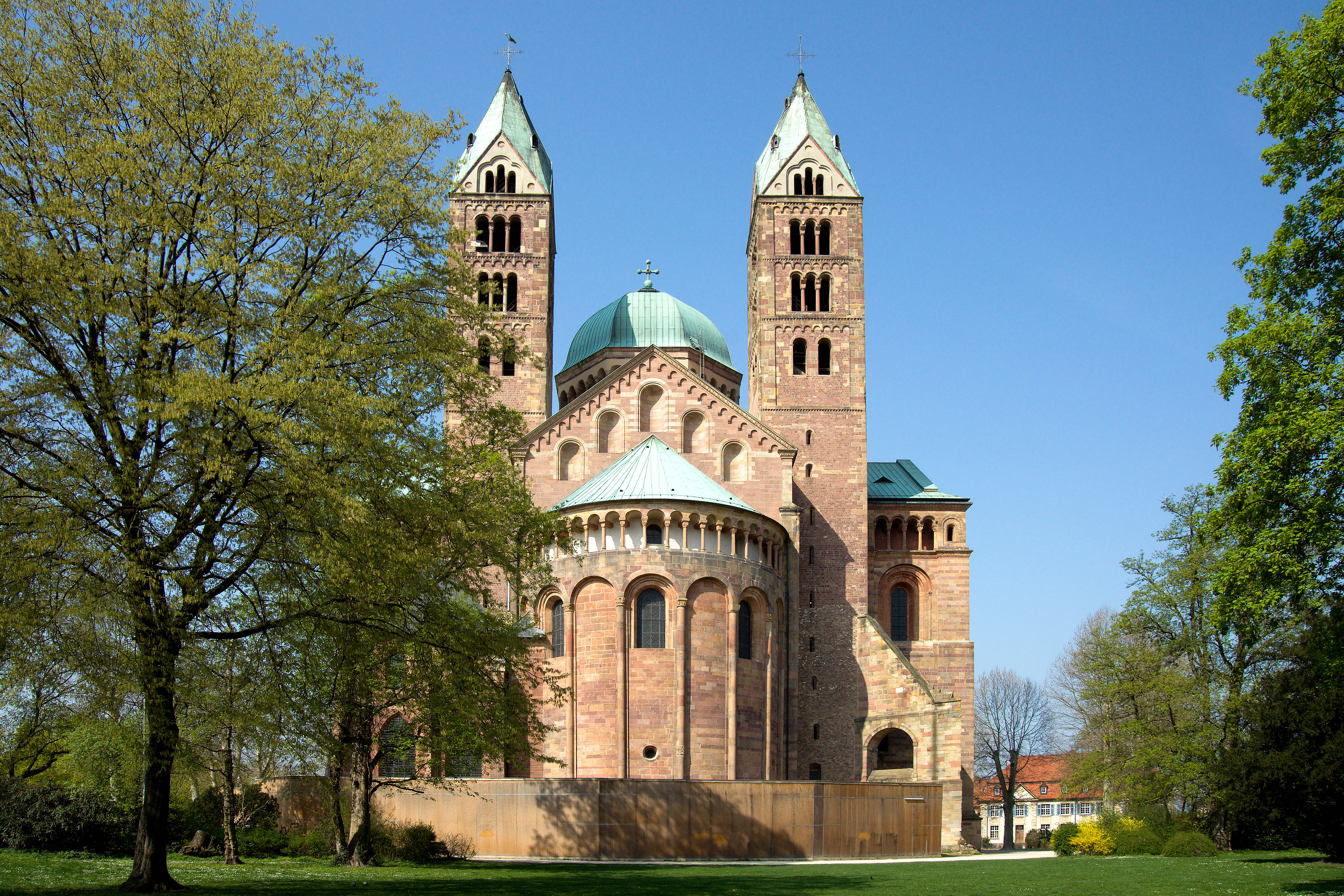
Speyer Cathedral, Germany, from the east, shows the apse projecting from a chancel framed by towers, with an octagonal dome over the crossing.

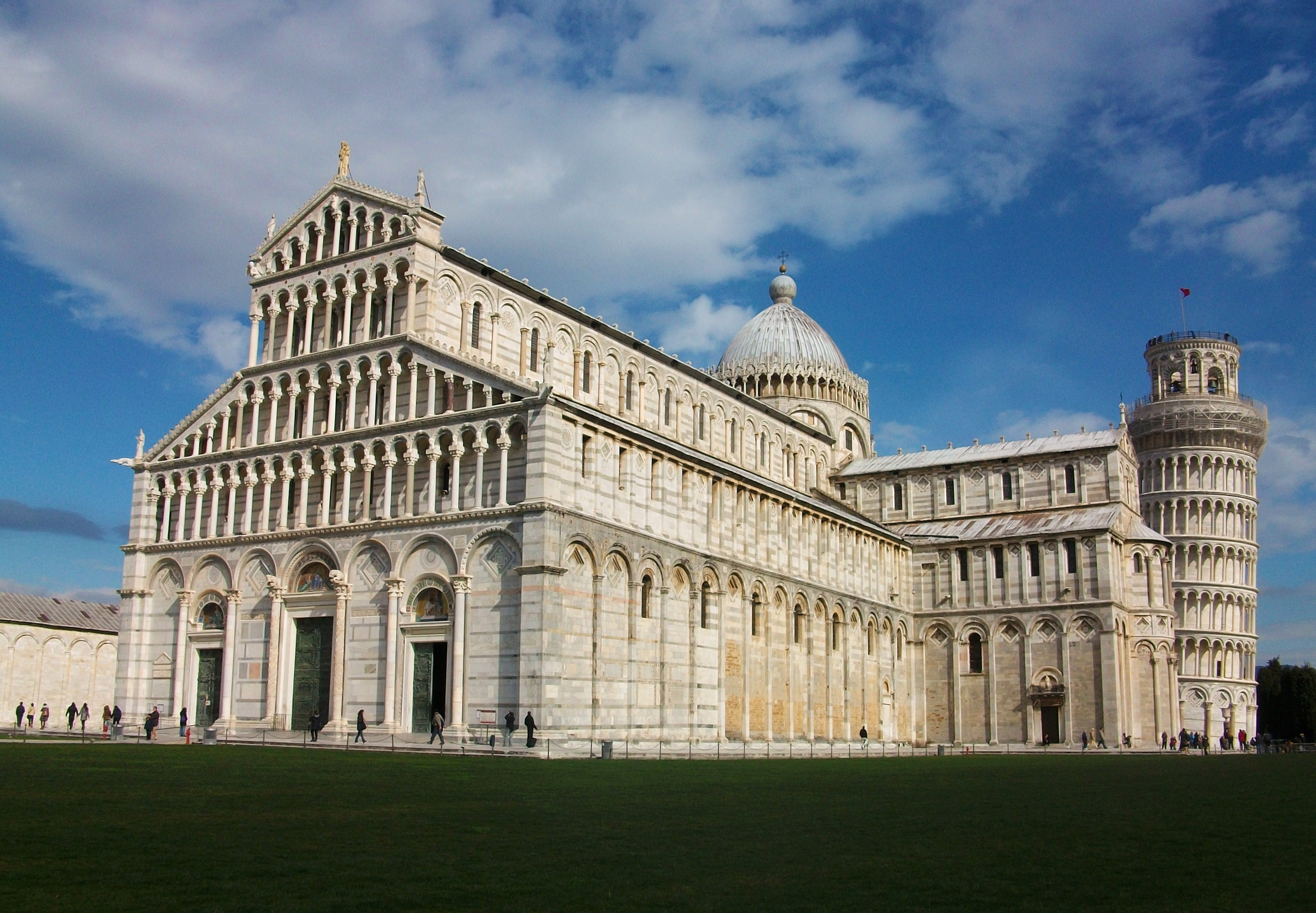
Pisa Cathedral, Italy, has a free-standing campanile and presents a harmony of polychrome and arcades.
Romanesque interiors

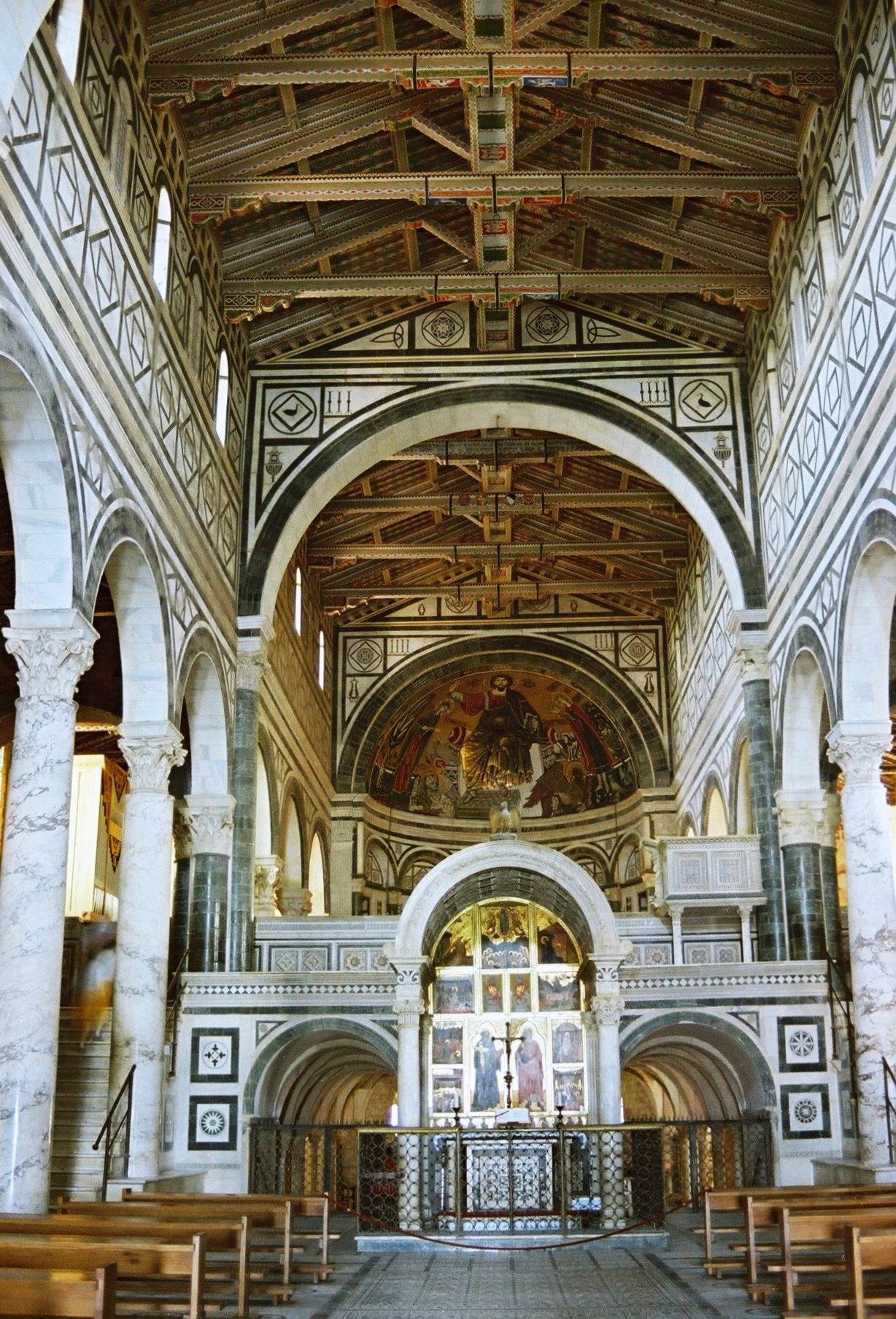
San Miniato al Monte, Florence, has basilical form, open timber roof and decoration of polychrome marble and mosaic.

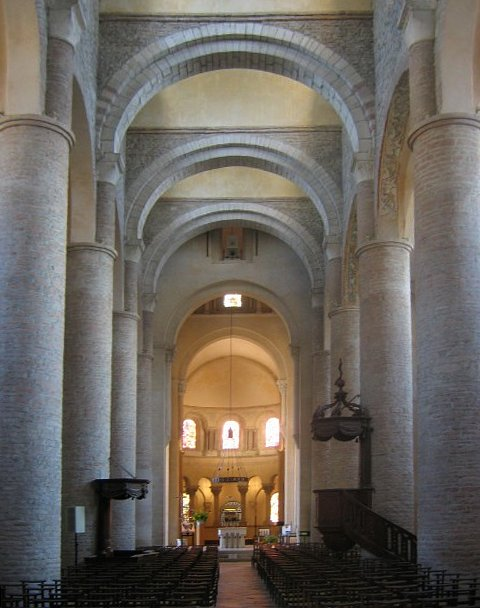
The Church of St. Philibert, Tournus, has tall circular piers and is roofed with transverse arches supporting a series of barrel vaults.

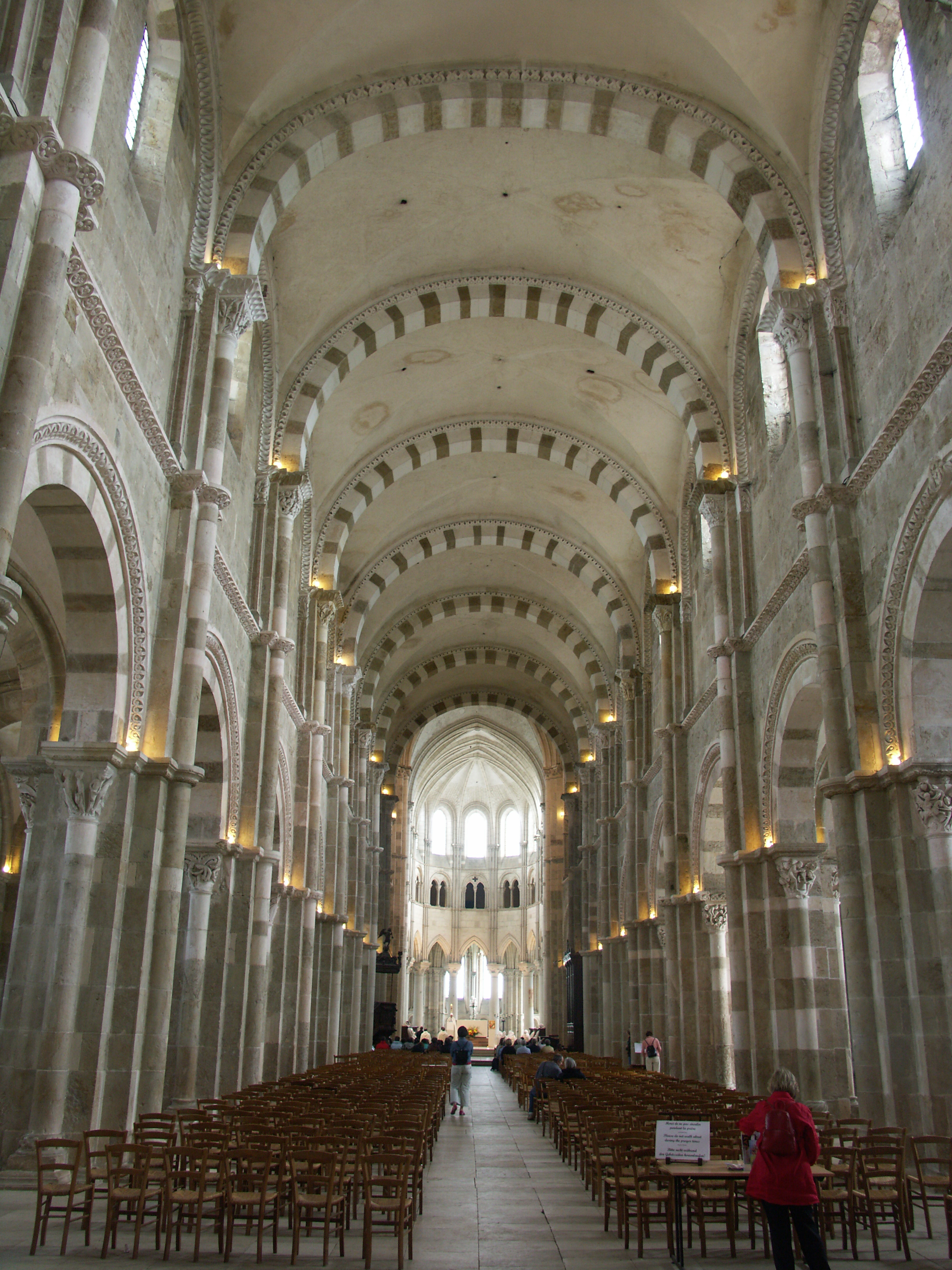
Vézelay Abbey has clusters of vertical shafts rising to support transverse arches and a groin vault. The east end is Gothic.

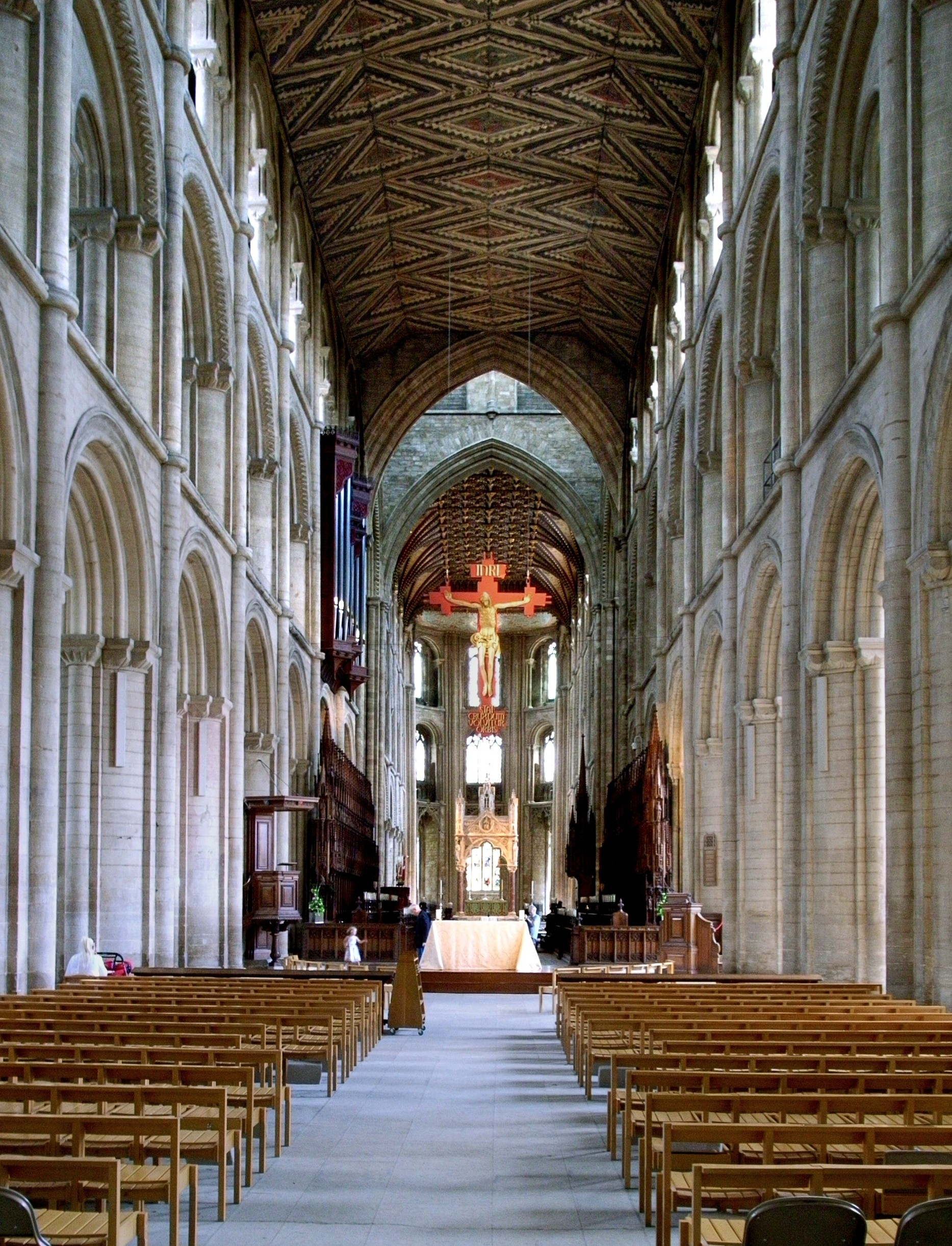
The nave of Peterborough Cathedral is in three stages supporting a rare wooden ceiling retaining its original decoration.

=== Gothic ===
By the mid 12th century many large cathedrals and abbey churches had been constructed and the engineering skills required to build high arches, stone vaults, tall towers and the like, were well established. The style evolved to one that was less heavy, had larger windows, lighter-weight vaulting supported on stone ribs and above all, the pointed arch which is the defining characteristic of the style now known as Gothic. With thinner walls, larger windows and high pointed arched vaults, the distinctive flying buttresses developed as a means of support. The huge windows were ornamented with stone tracery and filled with stained glass illustrating stories from the Bible and the lives of the saints.

Buildings representative of this period include Notre Dame, Paris; Chartres Cathedral, Reims Cathedral, Rouen Cathedral and Strasbourg Cathedral in France, Antwerp Cathedral in Belgium, Cologne Cathedral, Ulm Minster, Regensburg Cathedral and Freiburg Minster in Germany, St Stephen's Cathedral Vienna in Austria, Florence Cathedral, Siena Cathedral, Milan Cathedral and San Lorenzo Maggiore, Naples in Italy, Burgos Cathedral, Toledo Cathedral and Leon Cathedral in Spain, Guarda Cathedral in Portugal, Salisbury Cathedral, Canterbury Cathedral and Lincoln Cathedral in England.

Four of the best known Gothic Cathedrals

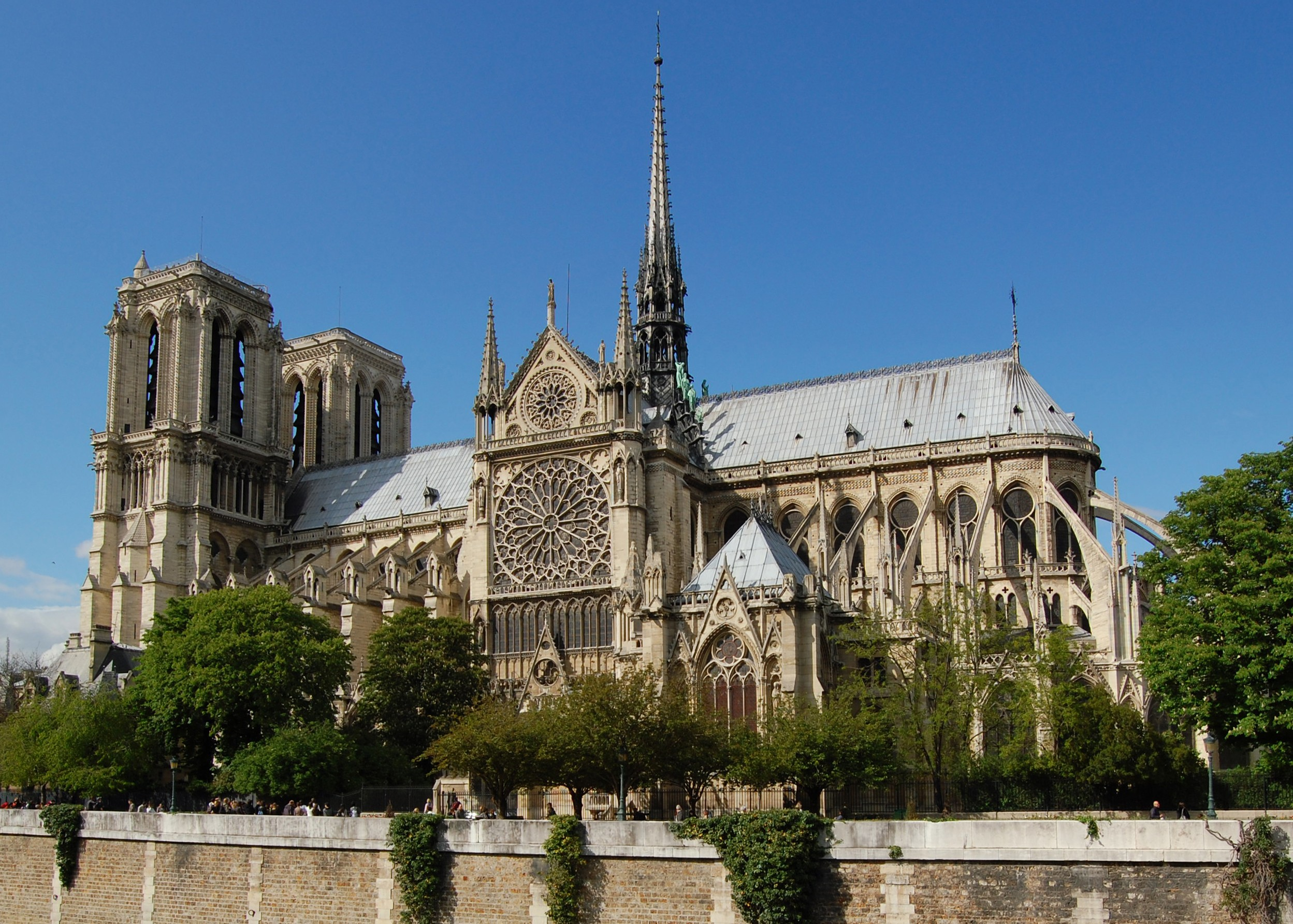
Notre-Dame de Paris

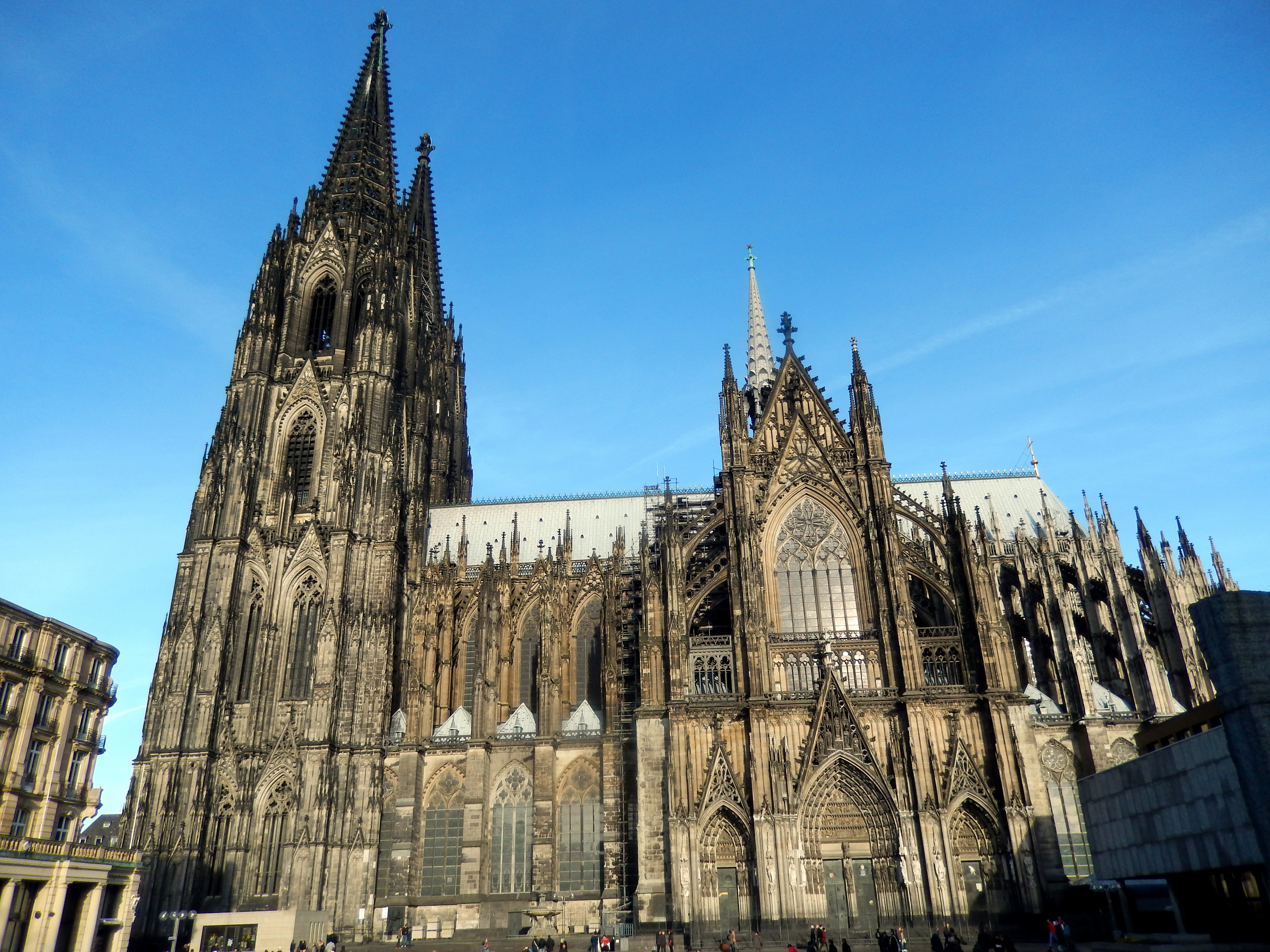
Cologne Cathedral, Germany

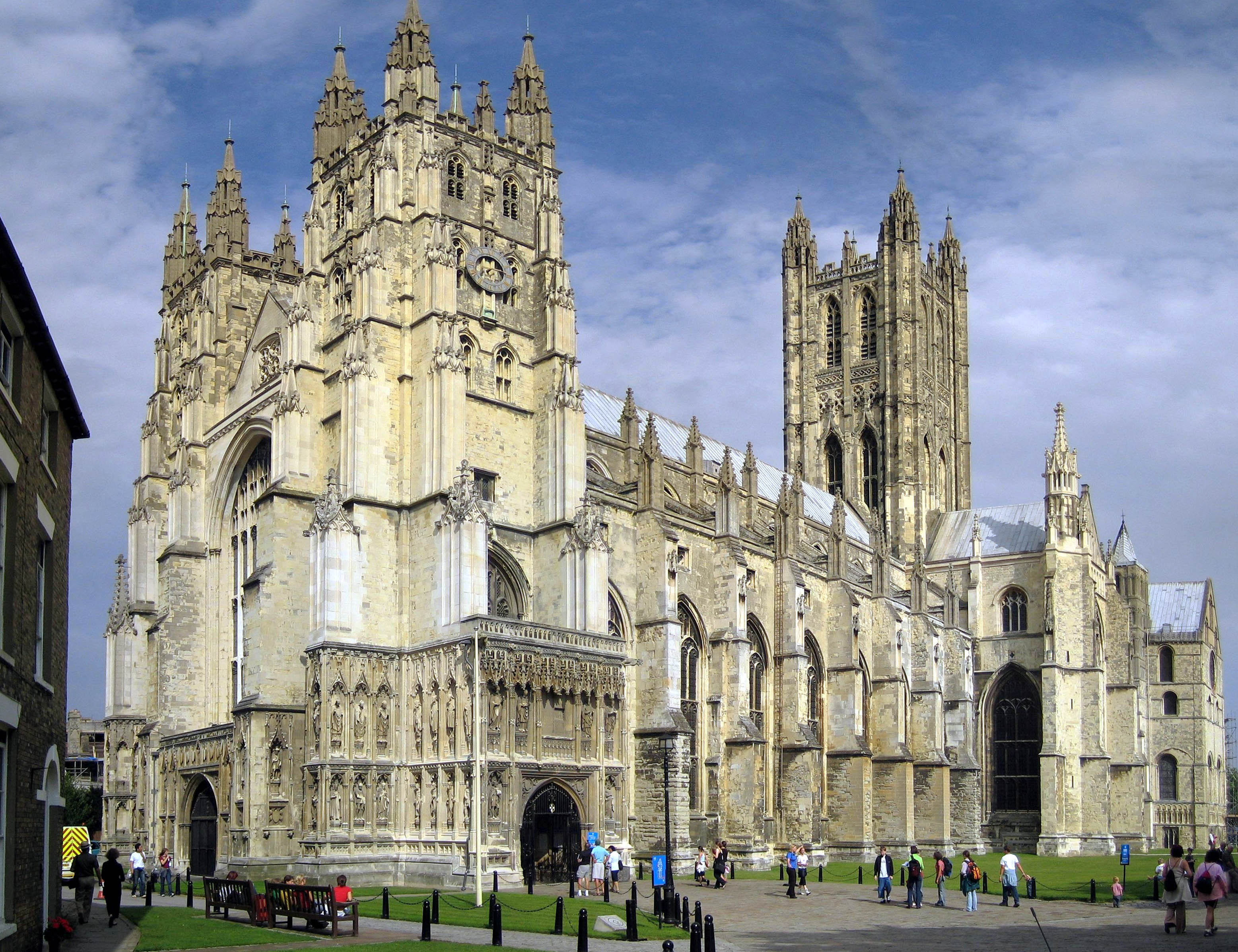
Canterbury Cathedral, England

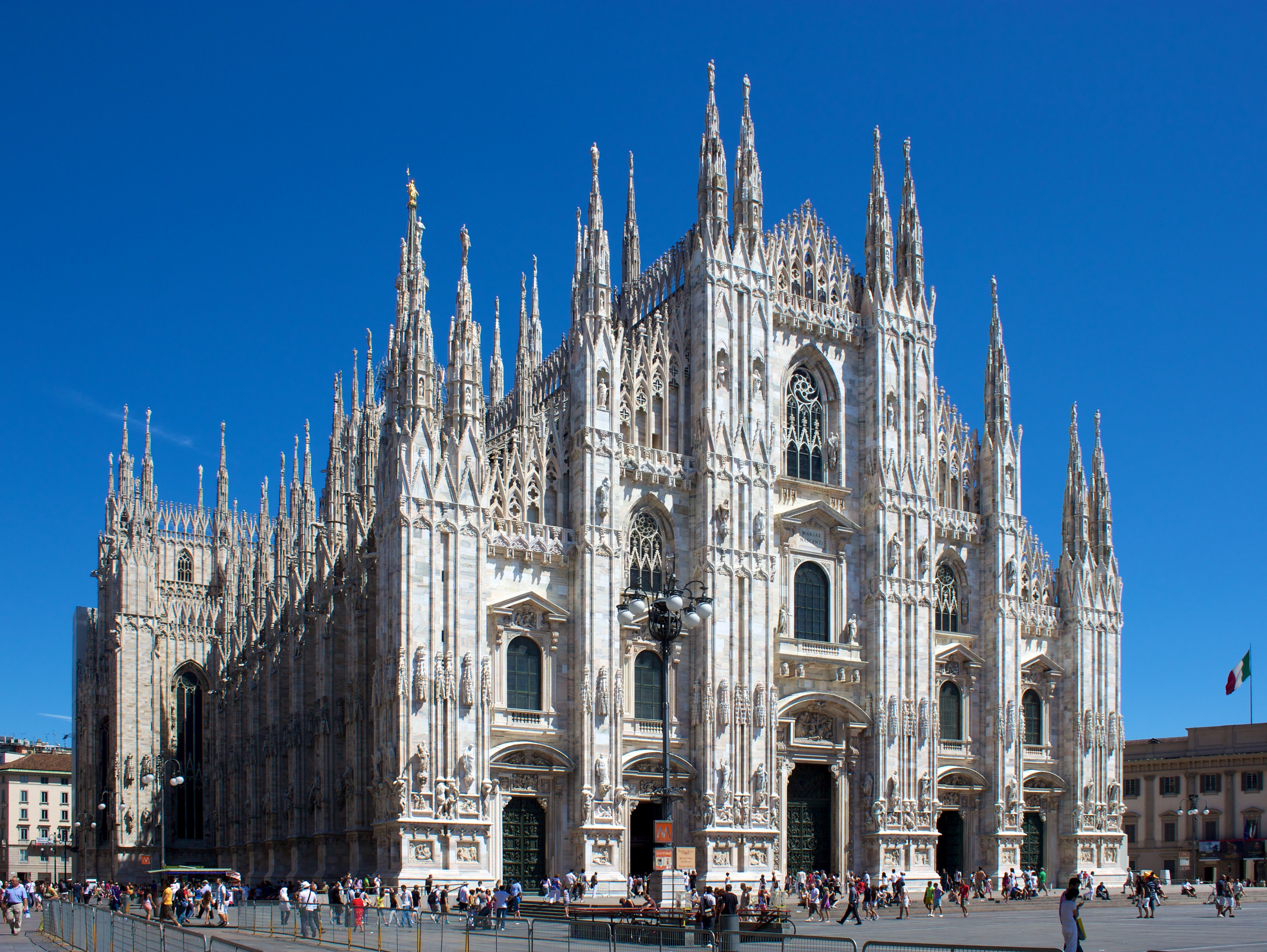
Milan Cathedral, Italy
Three Gothic interiors

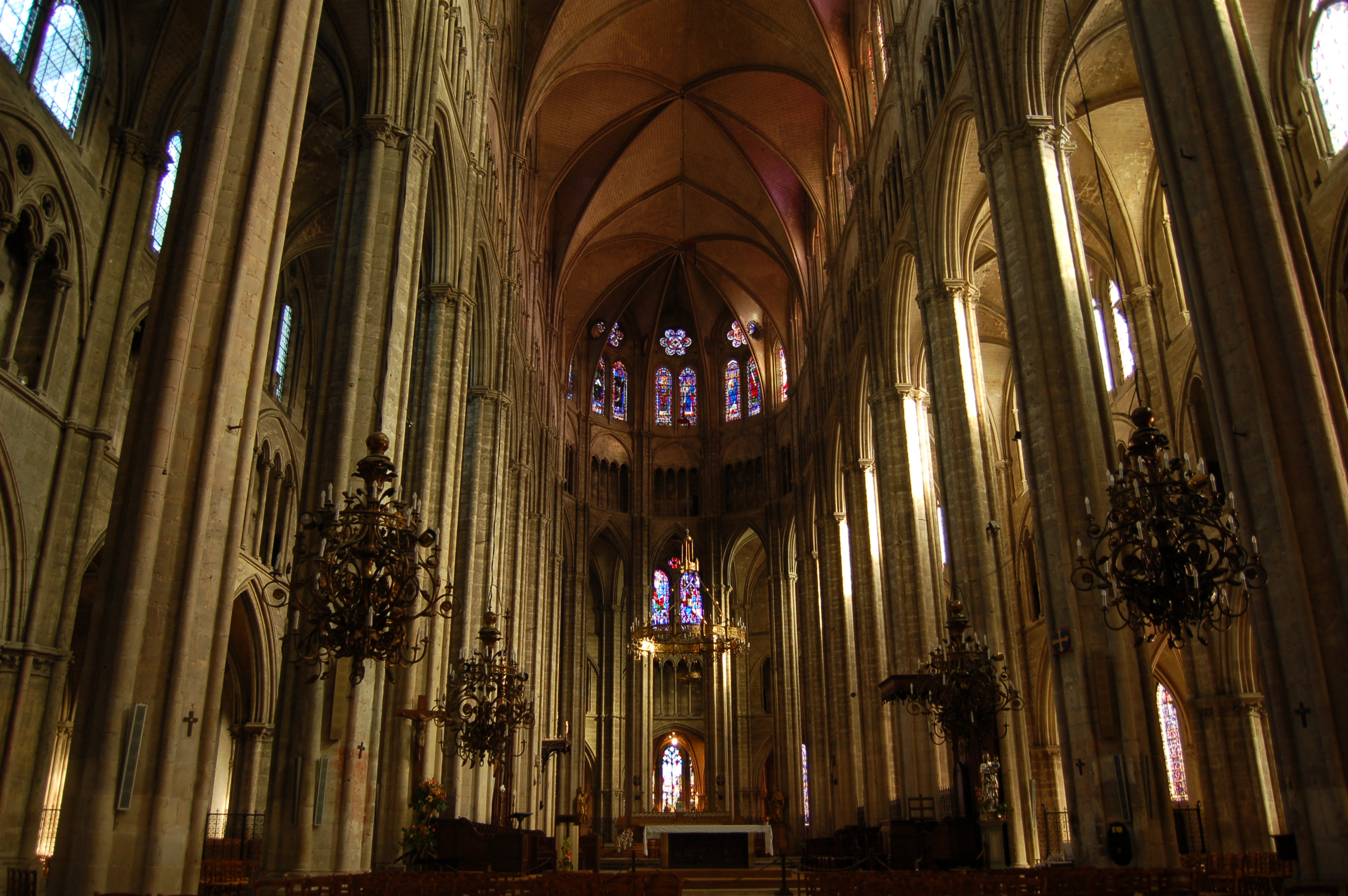
Bourges Cathedral, France

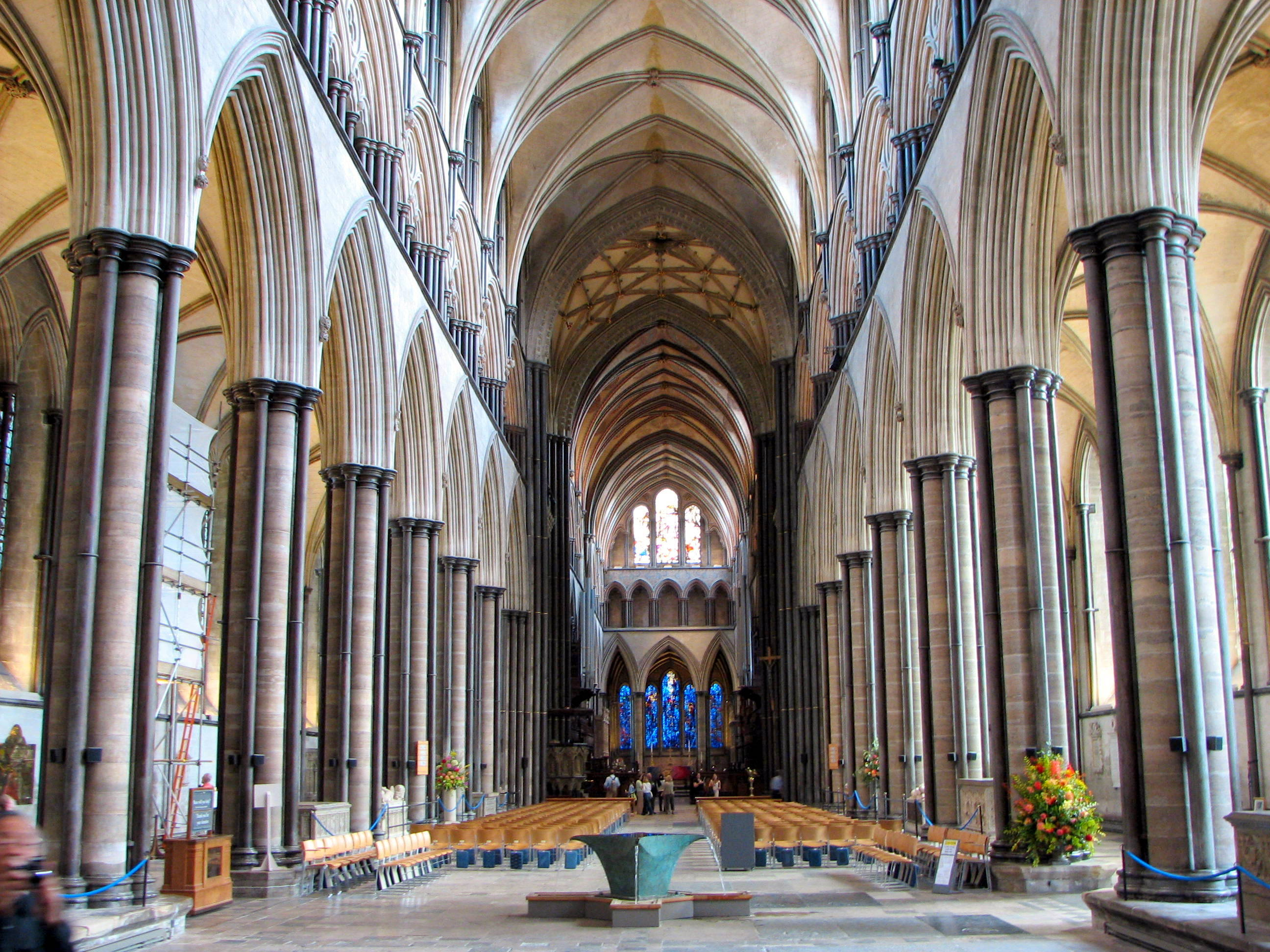
Salisbury Cathedral, England

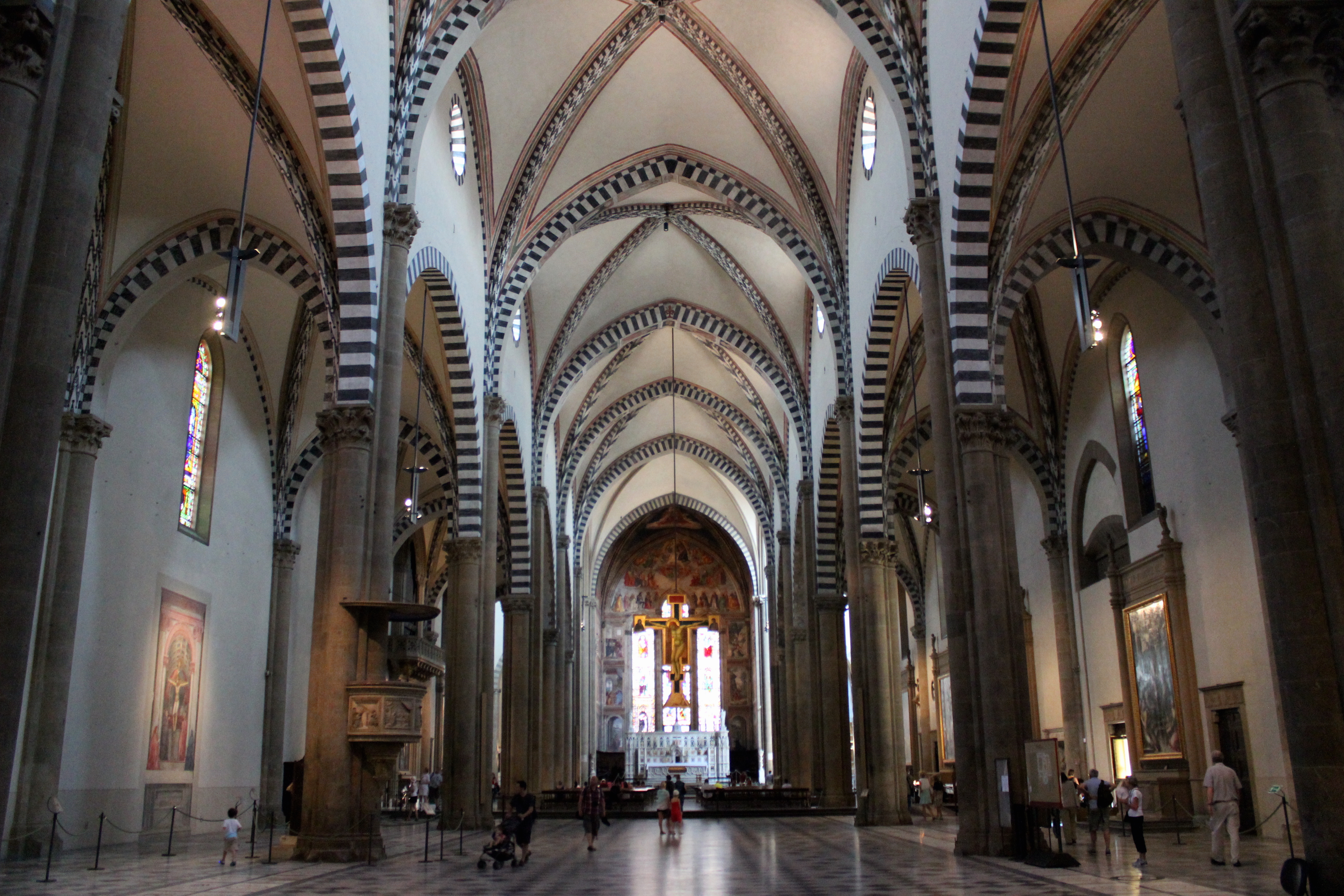
Basilica of Santa Maria Novella, Florence

=== Renaissance ===
In the early 15th century a competition was held in Florence for a plan to roof the central crossing of the huge, unfinished Gothic Florence Cathedral. It was won by the artist Brunelleschi who, inspired by domes that he had seen on his travels, such as that of San Vitale in Ravenna and the enormous dome of the Roman period which roofed the Pantheon, designed a huge dome which is regarded as the first building of the Renaissance period. Its style, visually however, is ribbed and pointed and purely Gothic. It was Renaissance (a rebirth) in its audacity and the fact that it looked back to Roman structural techniques.

Brunelleschi, and others like him, developed a passion for the highly refined style of Roman architecture, in which the forms and decorations followed rules of placement and proportion that had long been neglected. They sought to rediscover and apply these rules. It was a time of architectural theorising and experimentation. Brunelleschi built two large churches in Florence demonstrating how the new style could be applied, San Lorenzo's and Santo Spirito. They are essays in the Classical, with rows of cylindrical columns, Corinthian capitals, entablatures, semi-circular arches and apsidal chapels.

The greatest cathedral building of the age was the rebuilding of St Peter's Basilica in Rome, the combined work of the architects Bramante, Raphael, Sangallo, Maderno and surmounted by Michelangelo's glorious dome, taller but just one foot narrower than the one that Brunelleschi had built a hundred years earlier in Florence. The dome is both an external and an internal focus. The chancel and transept arms are identical in shape, thus recalling the Greek Cross plan of Byzantine churches. The nave was, in fact, an addition.

Pope Julius II was able to commission the most renowned artists of his day as designers; the role of architect had not yet become a separate one from painter, sculptor or builder.

Renaissance churches of Italy

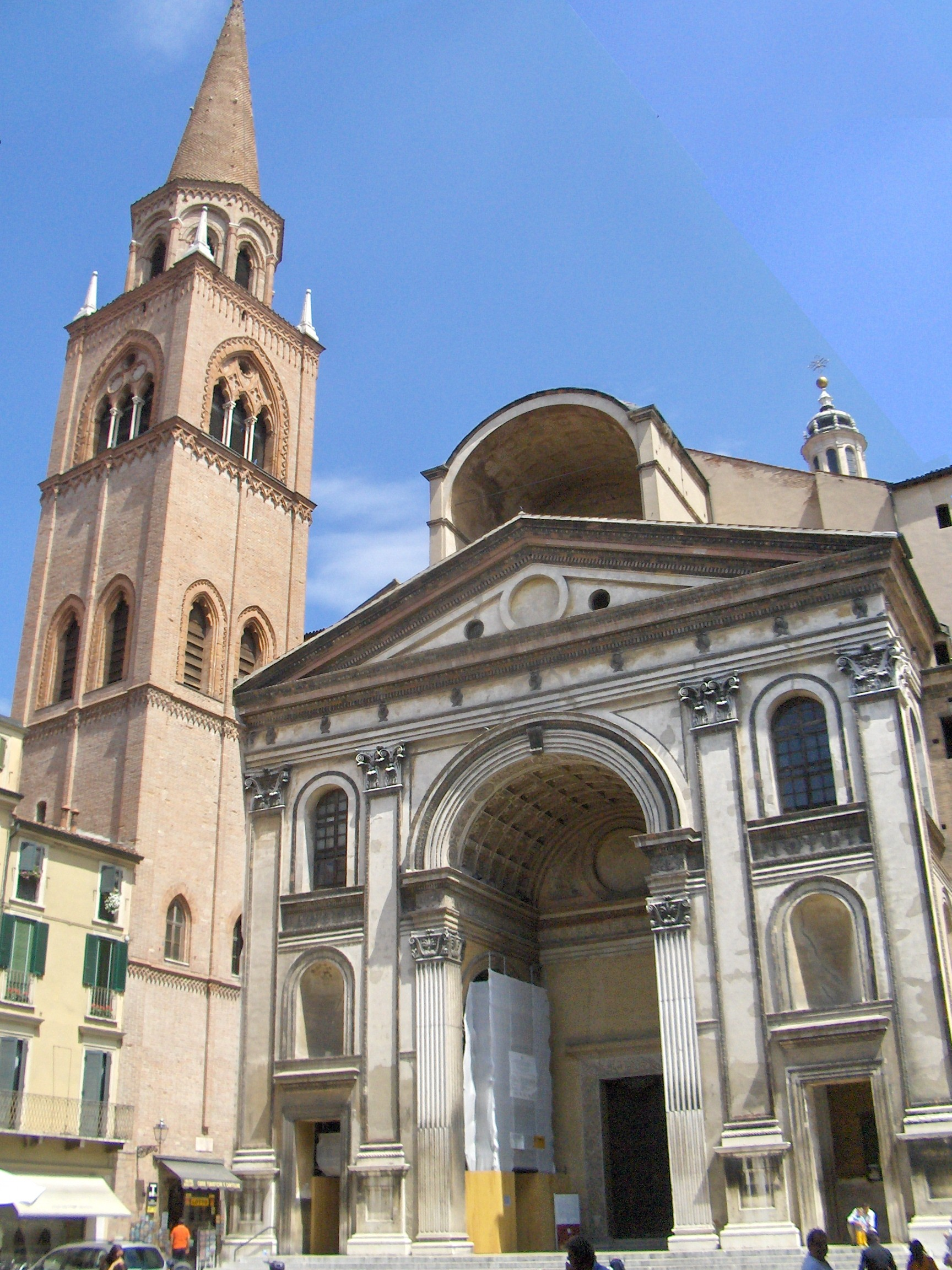
Basilica of Sant'Andrea, Mantua

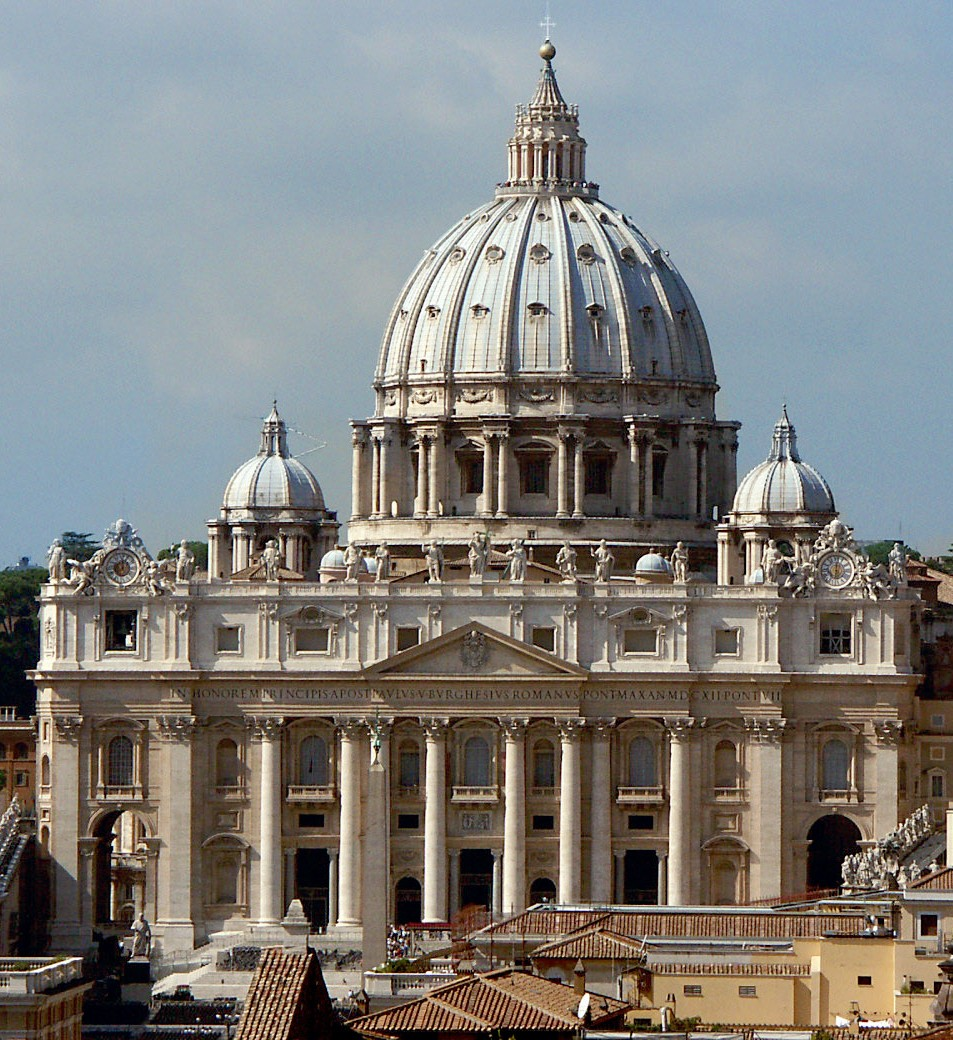
St. Peter's Basilica with Maderno's façade and Michelangelo's Dome.

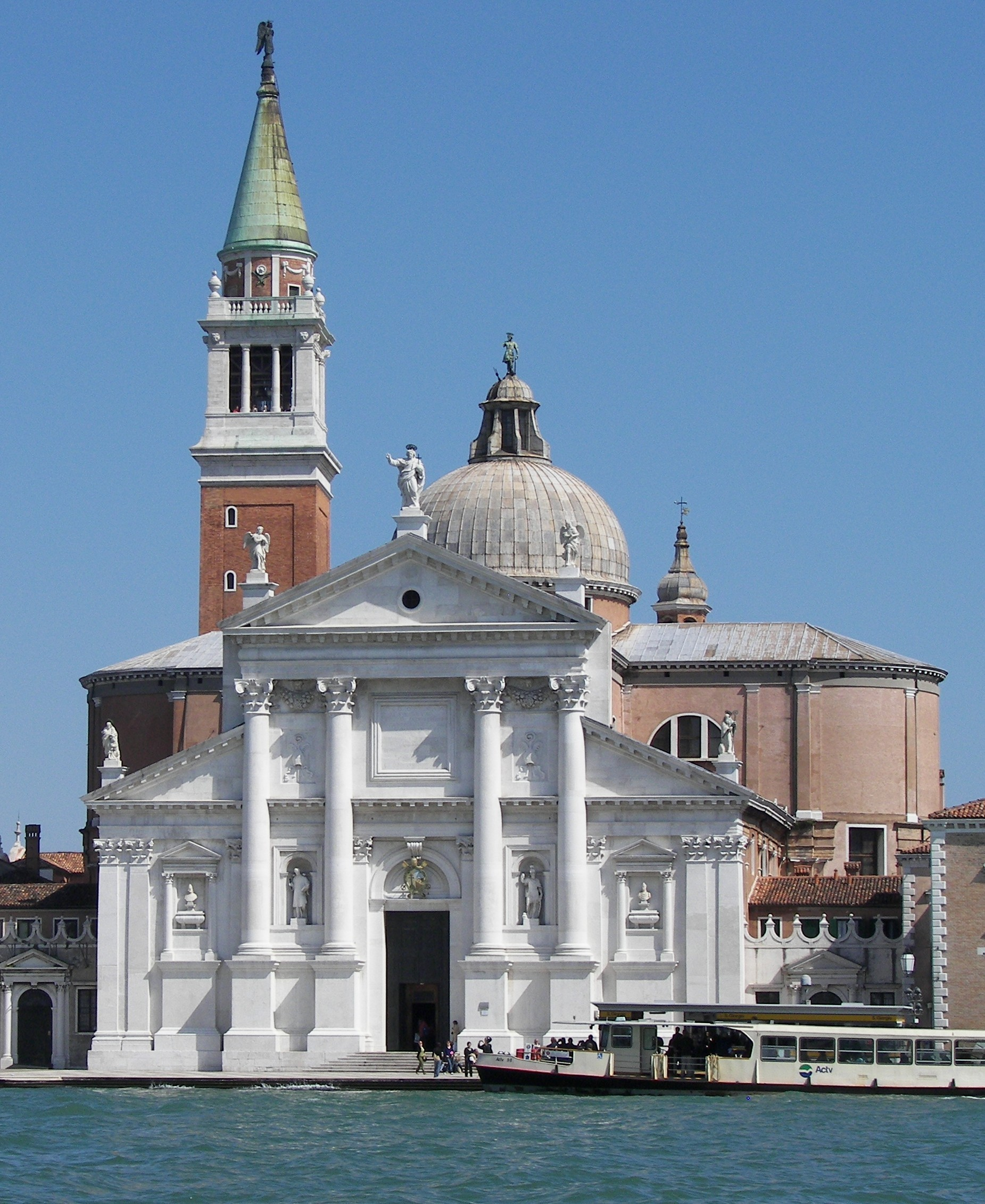
Basilica of San Giorgio, Venice
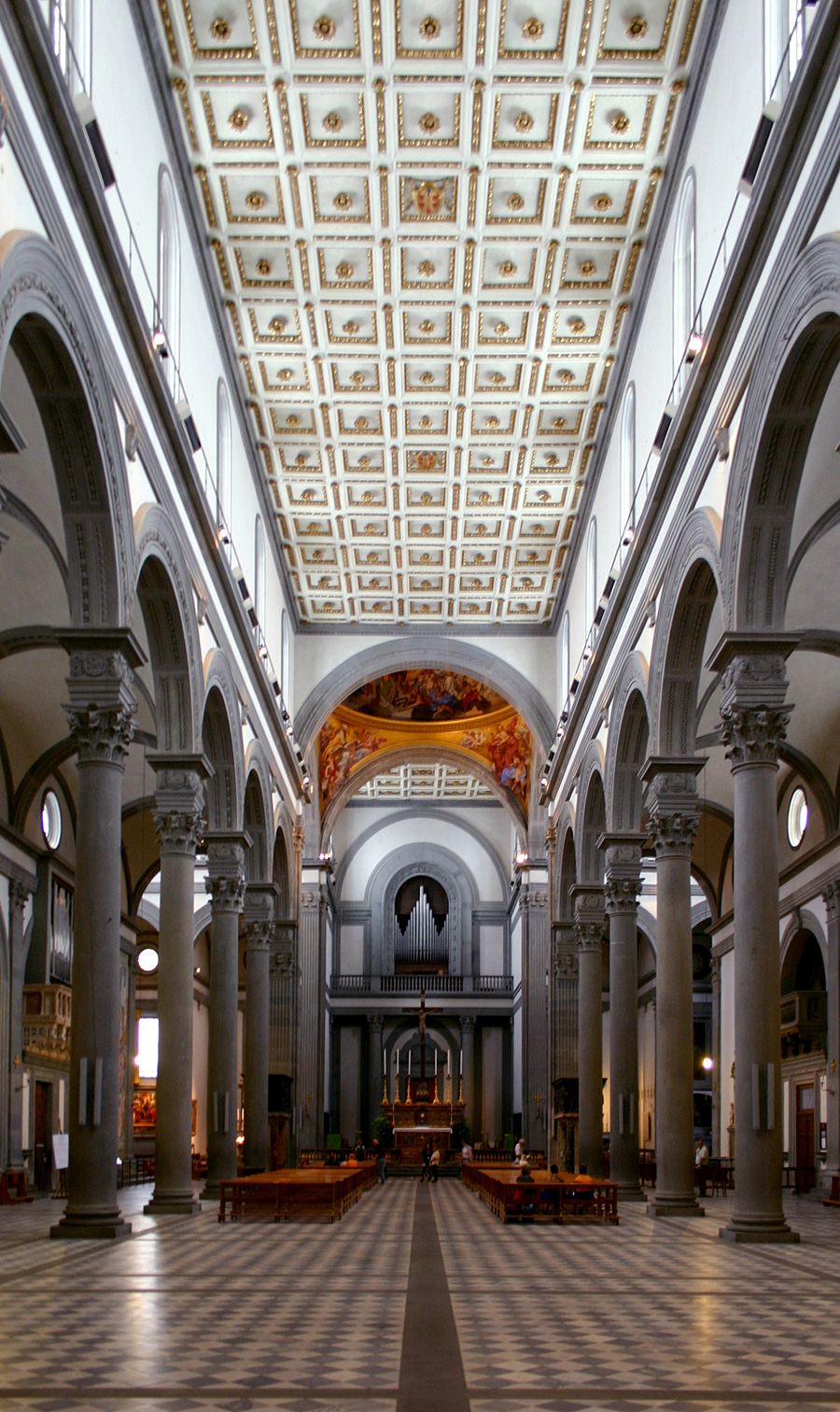
San Lorenzo, Florence

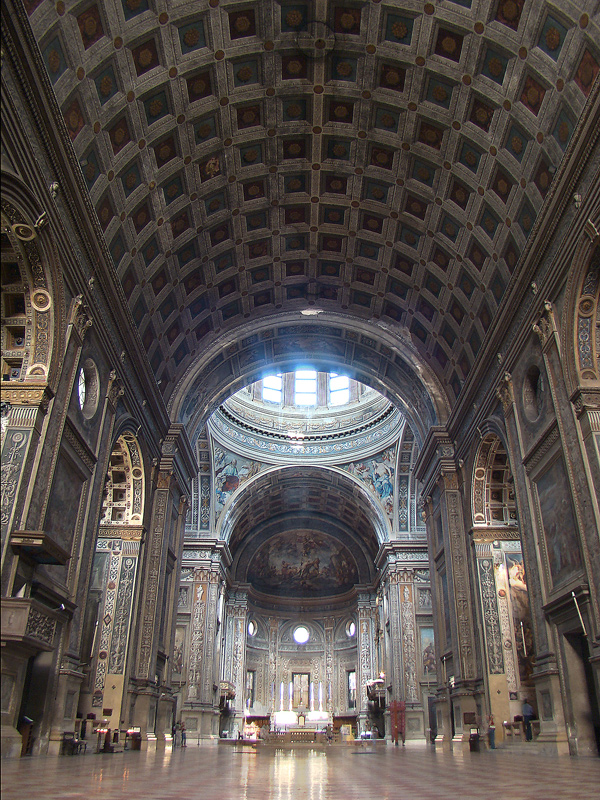
Sant'Andrea, Mantua

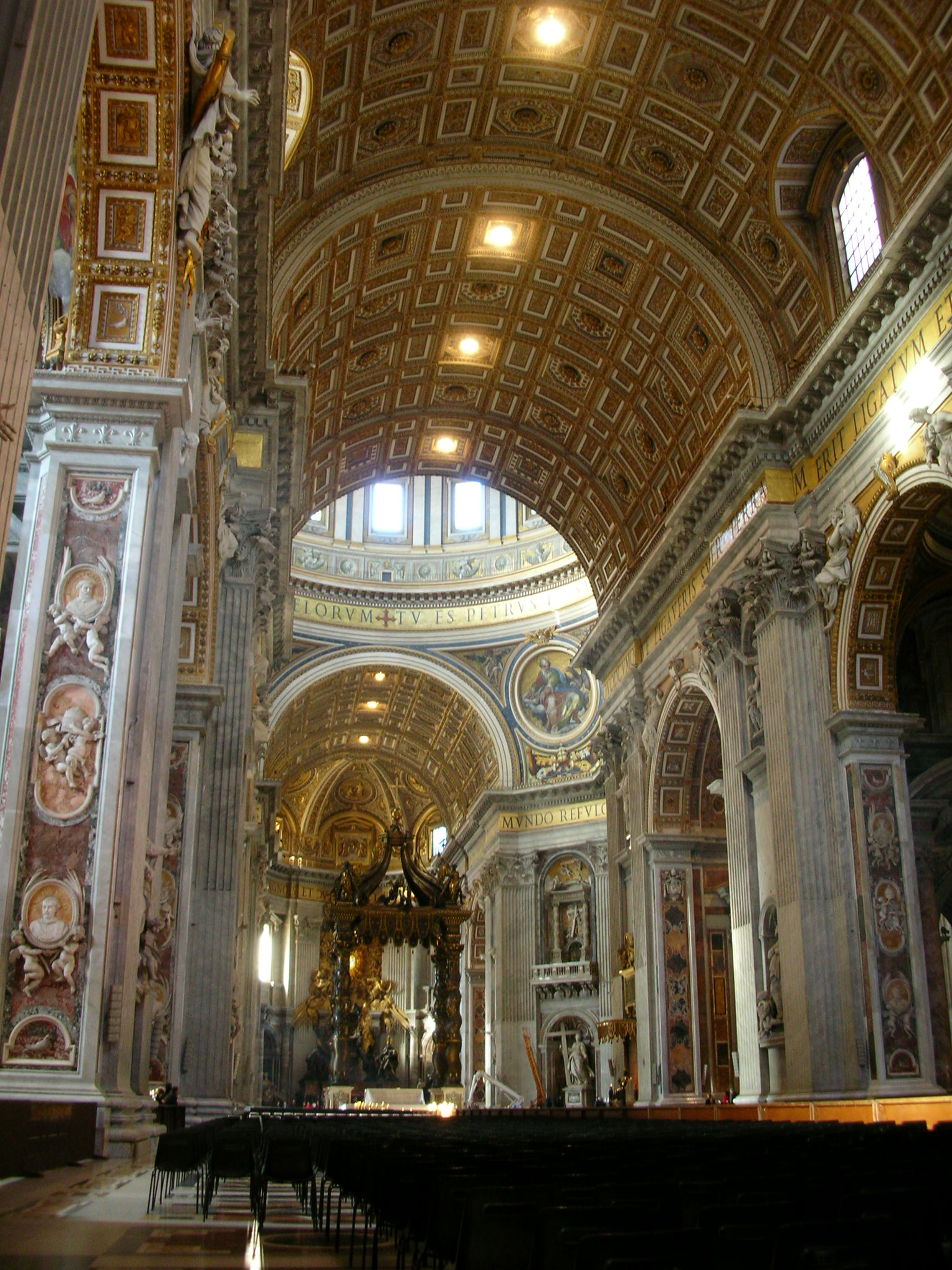
St. Peter's Basilica, Rome

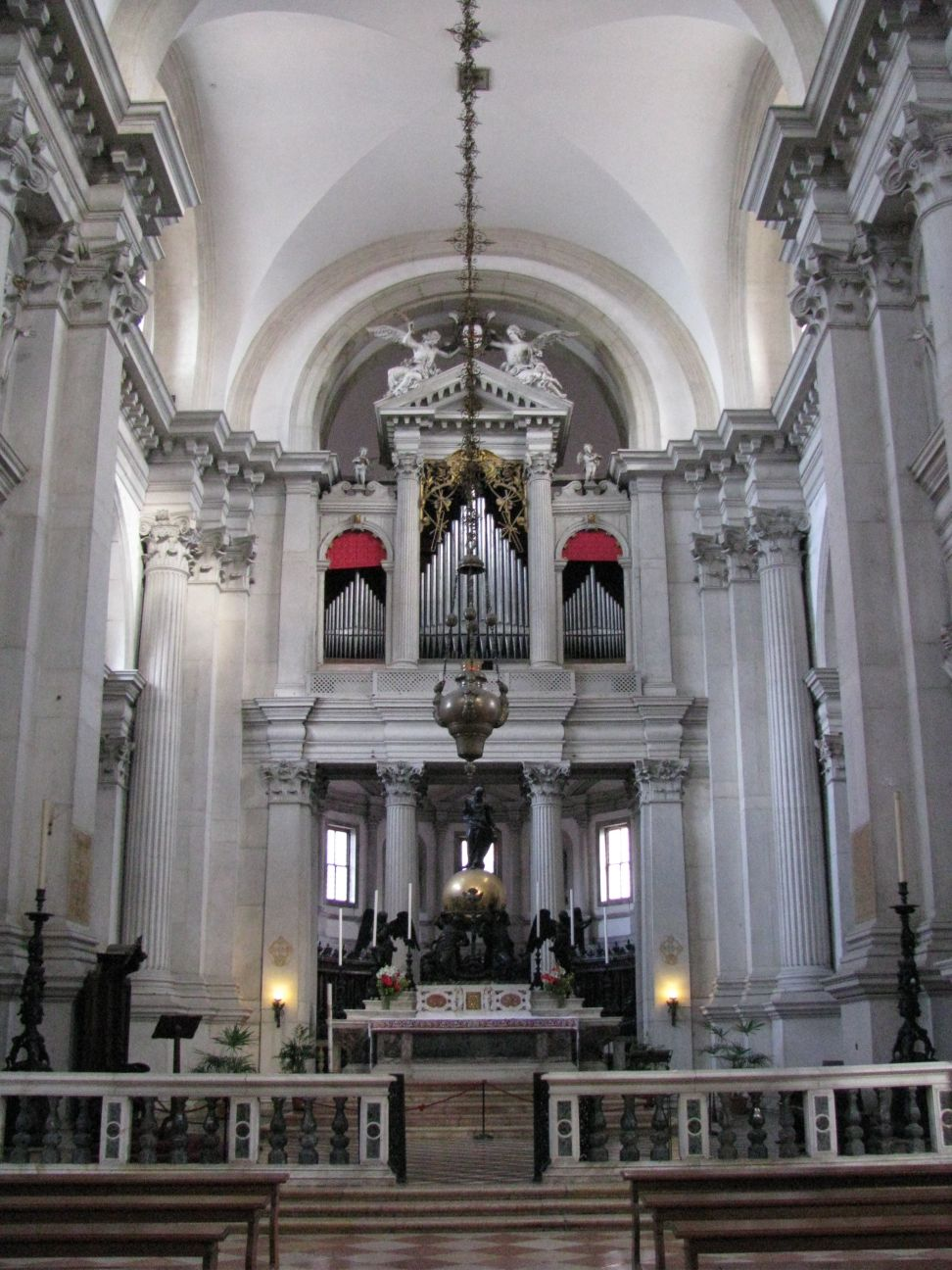
San Giorgio Maggiore, Venice

=== Baroque ===
By the time that St Peter's was completed, a style of architecture was developed by architects who knew all the rules that had been so carefully recovered, and chose to break them. The effect was a dynamic style of architecture in which the forms seem to take on life of their own, moving, swaying and undulating. The name Baroque means 'mis-shapen pearl'.

There are many large churches, abbeys, and basilicas built in this style, but few cathedrals in Western Europe, the most notable exception being St Paul's Cathedral in London. St Paul's is an unusual cathedral in that it was designed by a single individual and completed in a short time. The architect was Sir Christopher Wren and the building replaced the ancient cathedral which burnt down in the Great Fire of 1666. It is in the Baroque style, but it is a very controlled and English sort of Baroque in which Wren creates surprising and dramatic spatial effects, particularly in his use of the dome, which, like Brunelleschi's dome in Florence, spans not only the nave but also the aisles, opening the whole centre of the church into a vast light space.

In Russia, for the most part, the Baroque style was overlaid as architectonic features on the essentially Byzantine forms used for church construction. Many churches were built in this style, notably the Cathedral of the Dormition at Smolensk and the Cathedral of the Presentation at Solvychegodsk. In the design of many churches the Byzantine arrangement of tented roof or onion dome is replaced with a larger dome, usually on a tall, often polygonal, tambour.

Many European cathedrals have baroque features, high altars, façades and chapels. The façades of Santiago de Compostela, Jaén Cathedral and Valladolid Cathedral in Spain was rebuilt at this time. The Baroque style was carried by the Spanish and Portuguese to South and Central America, to the Philippines and to Goa in India where it was to become the prominent style of building for churches large and small. Both in the Americas and the Philippines, large Baroque churches often have a proportionally very wide façade which seems stretched between the towers. The intensely ornate decoration both in Spain and the Americas is called Churrigueresque.

Baroque Europe

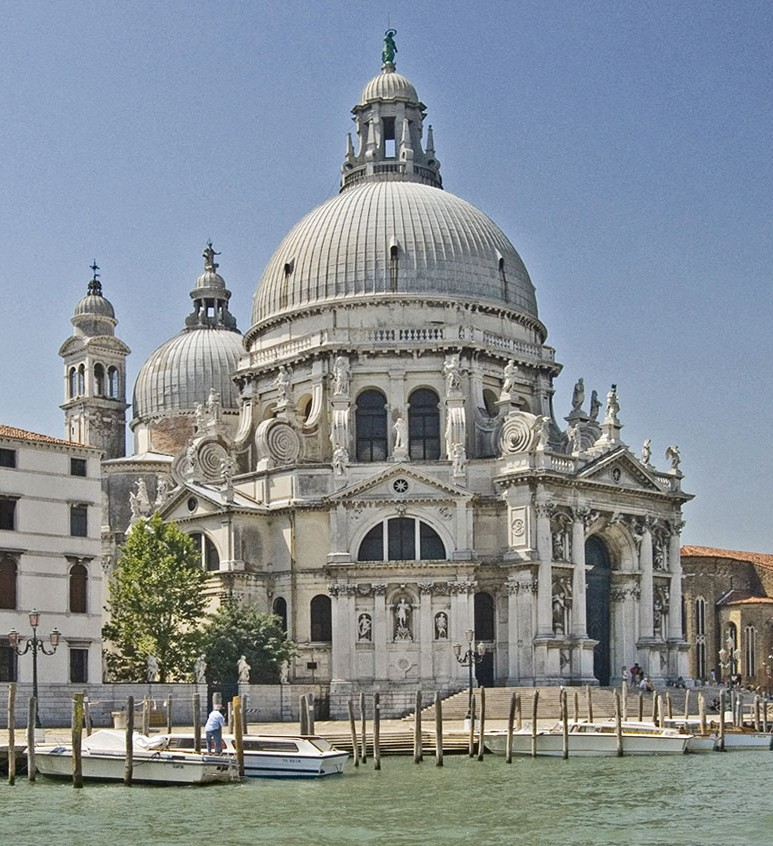
Santa Maria della Salute, Venice (1631)

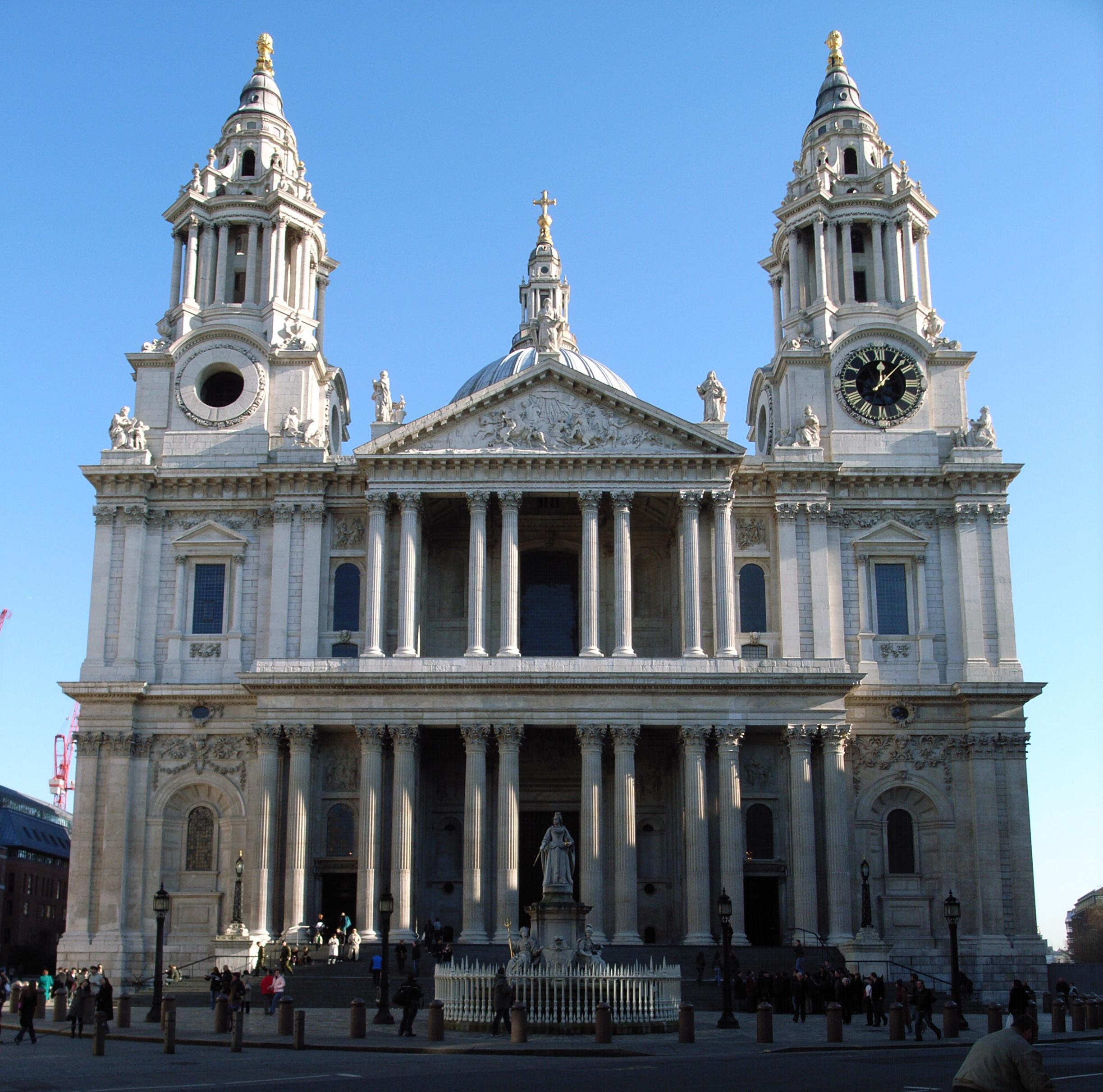
St Paul's Cathedral, London, (1670–1710) uses a motif of paired columns to create dynamic interplay of spaces

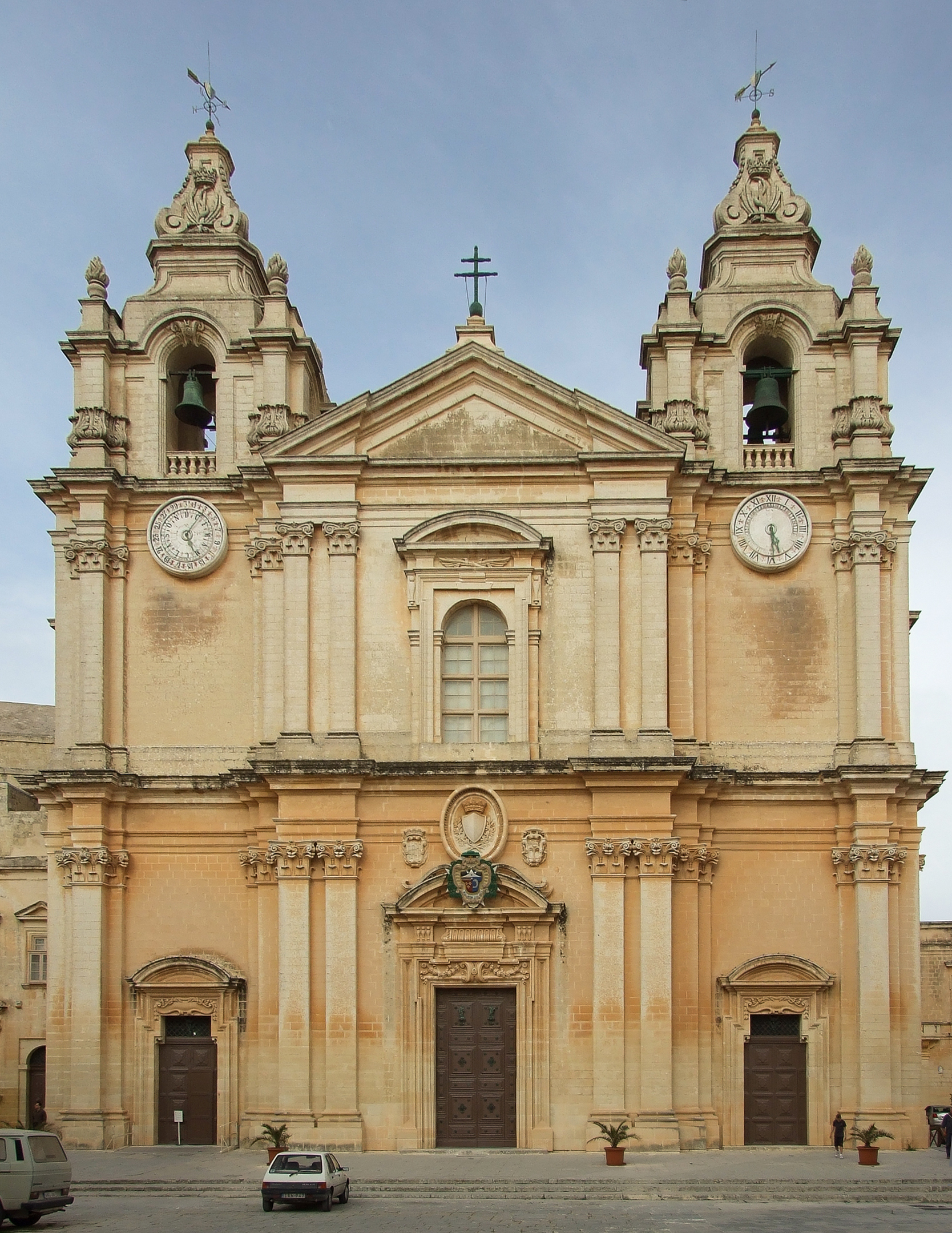
St. Paul's Cathedral, Mdina (1696–1705)

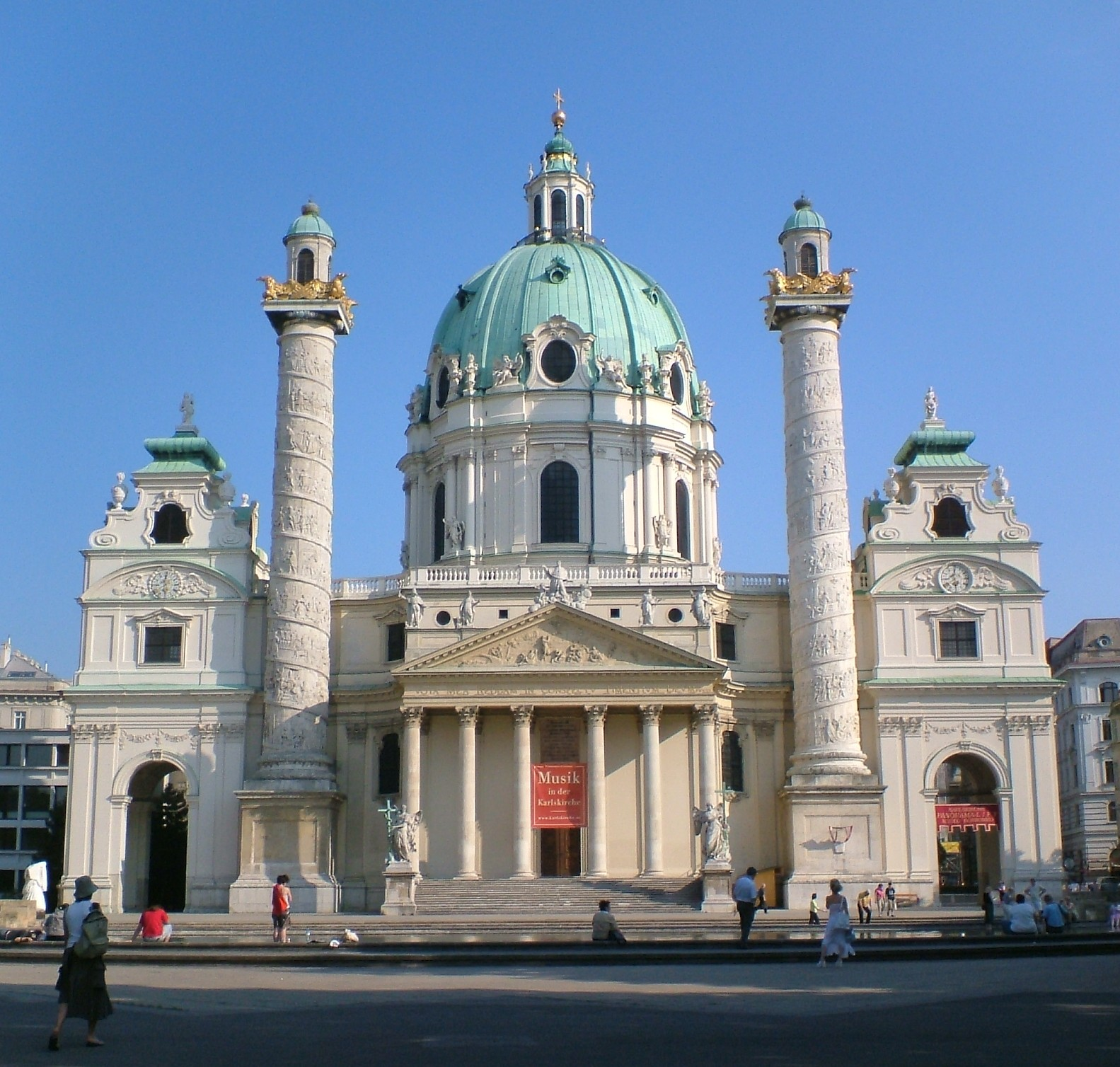
Karlskirche, Vienna, (1716–1737)
Baroque interiors

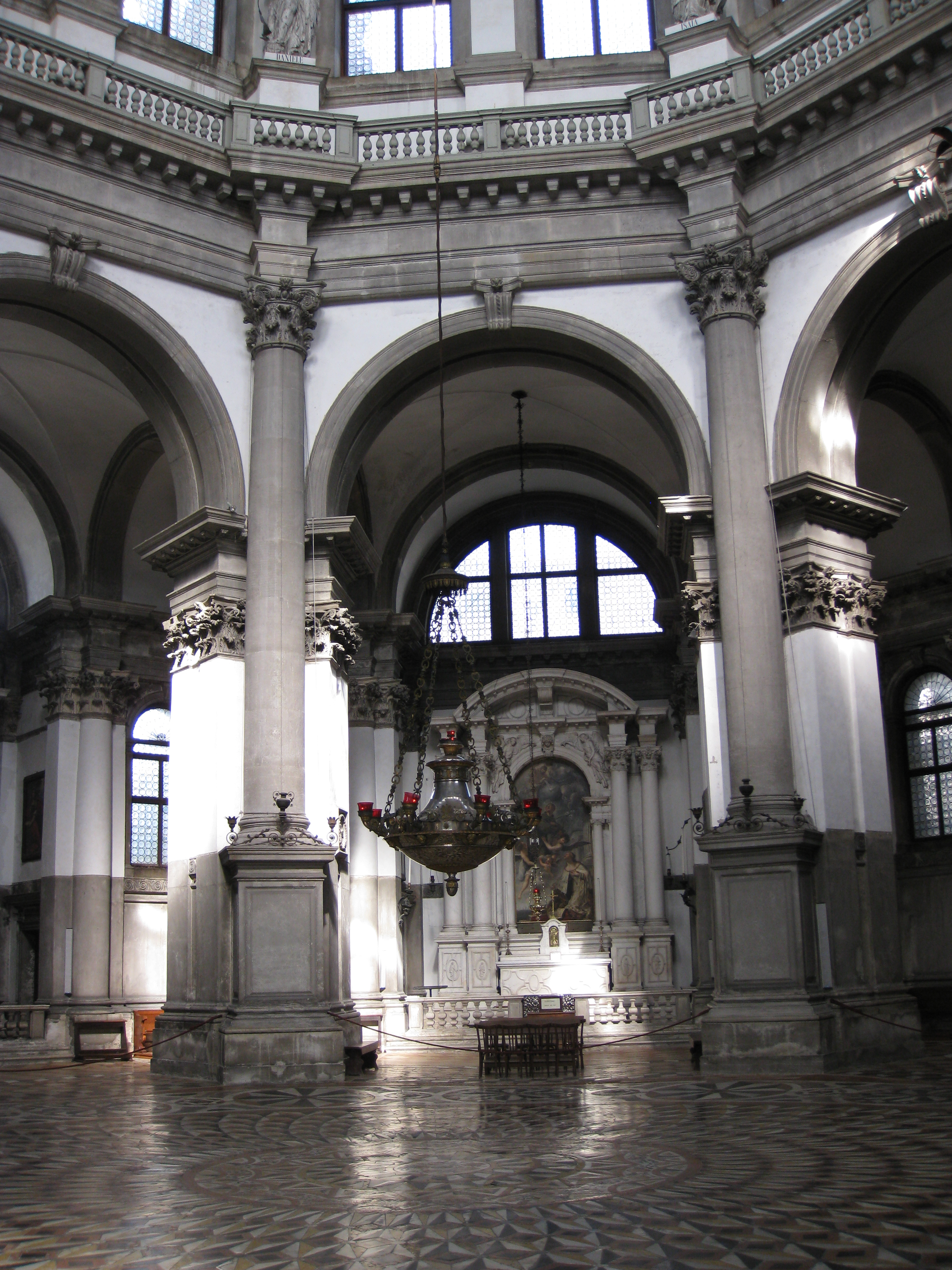
Santa Maria della Salute, Venice (1631)

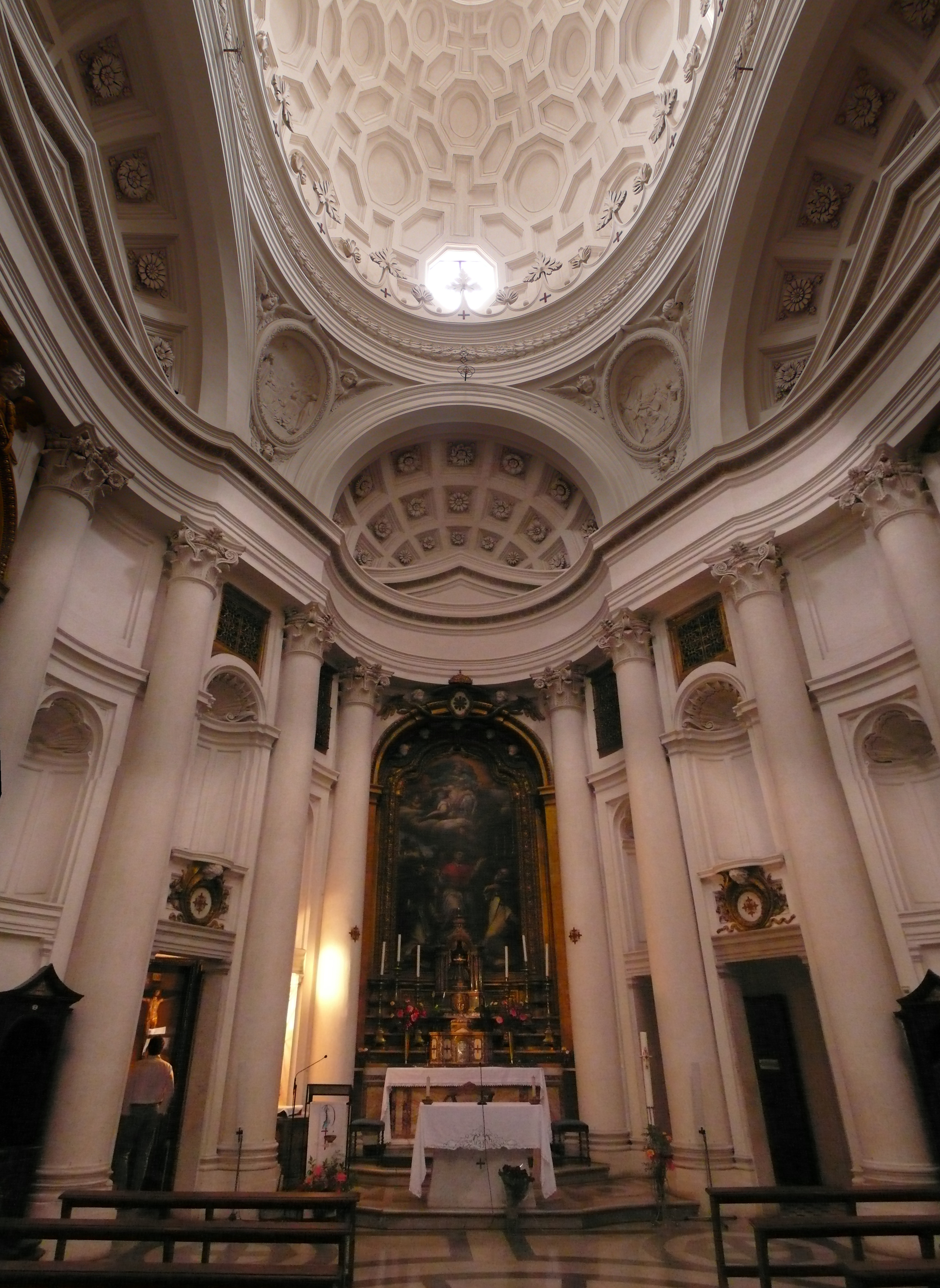
San Carlo alle Quattro Fontane, Rome (1634–1647)

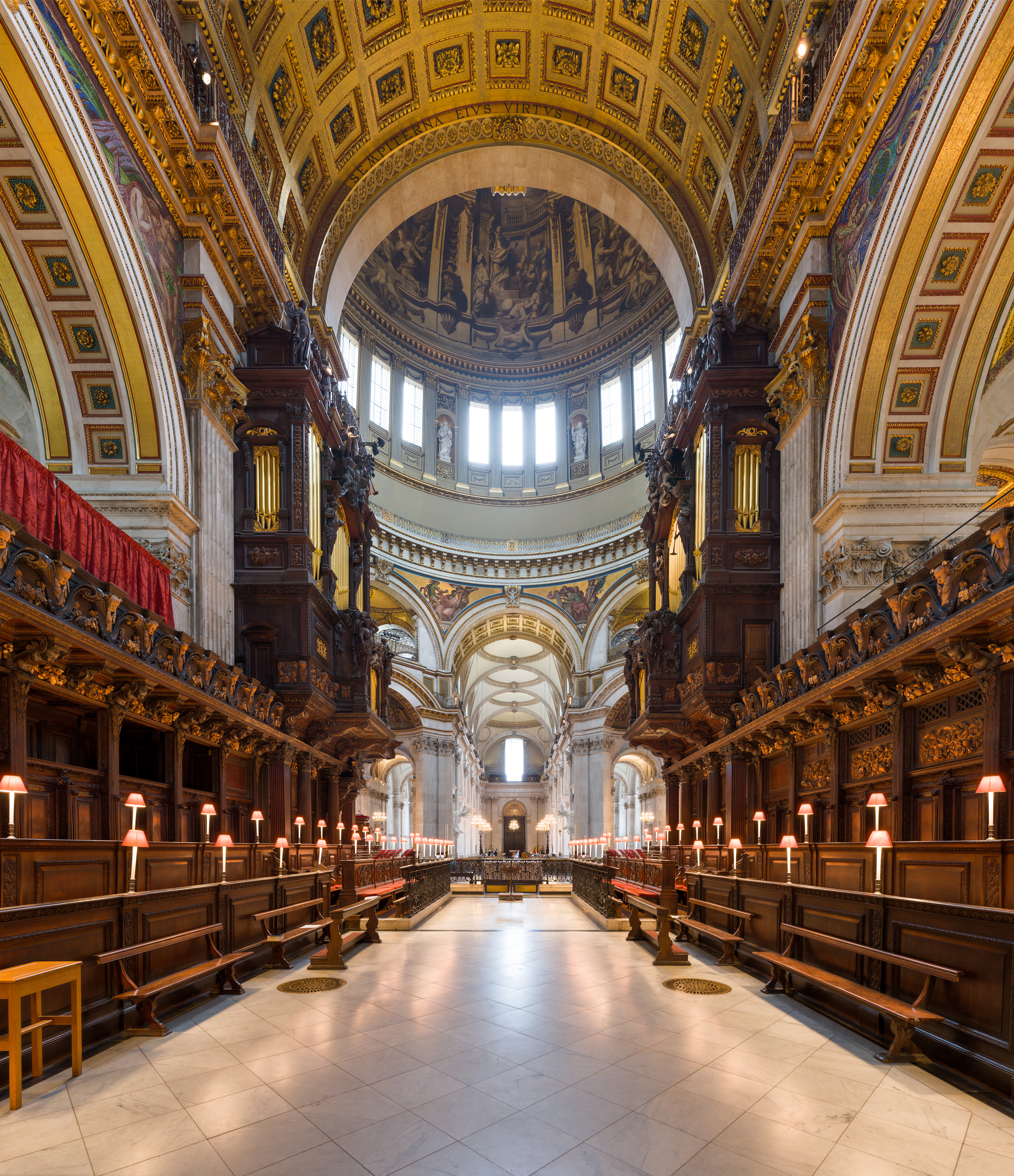
St Paul's Cathedral, London

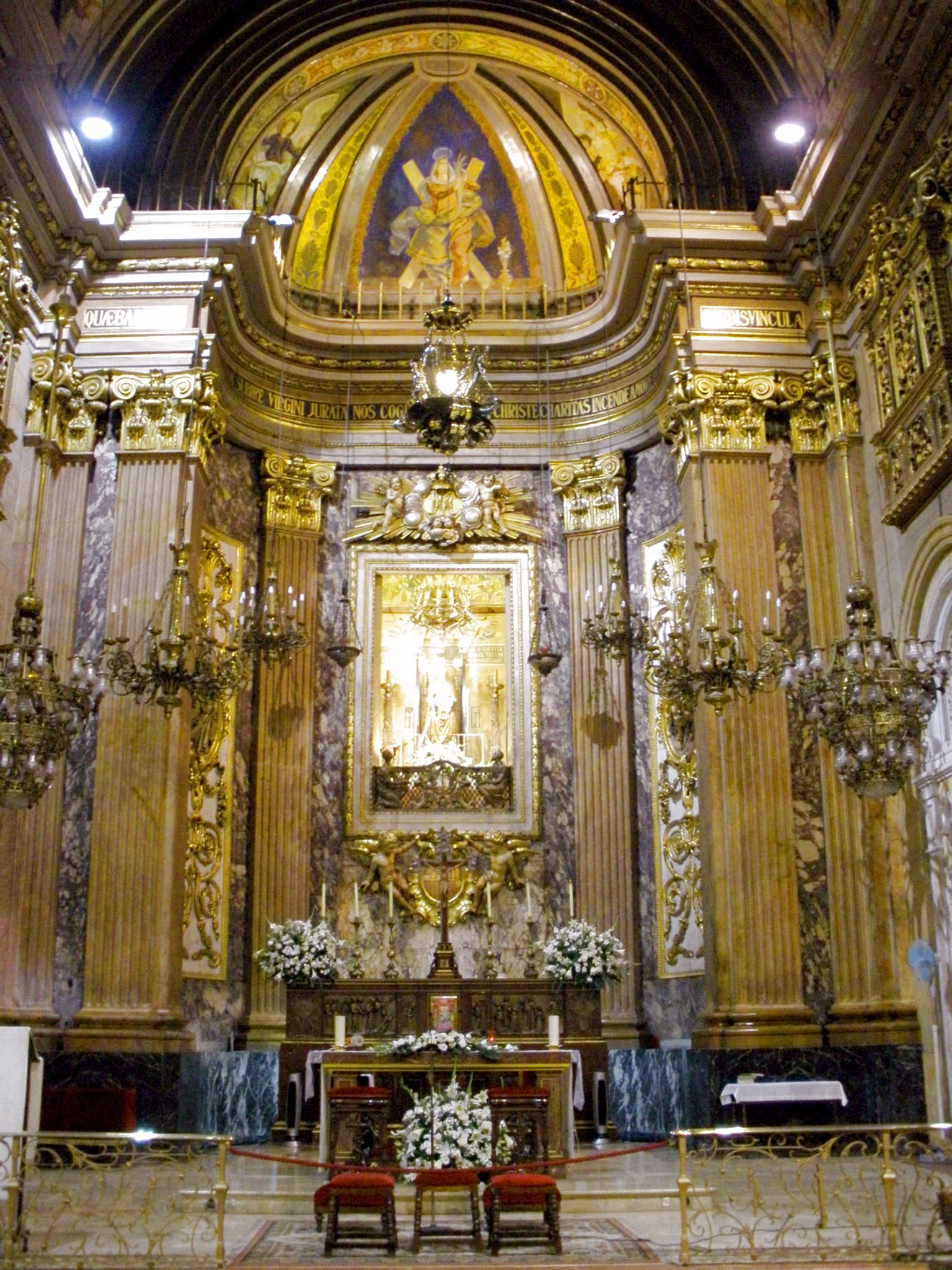
The chancel of the Basilica of Our Lady of Mercy, Barcelona.

The chancel of Evora Cathedral, Portugal, (1718–1746)
Eastern Orthodox Baroque churches

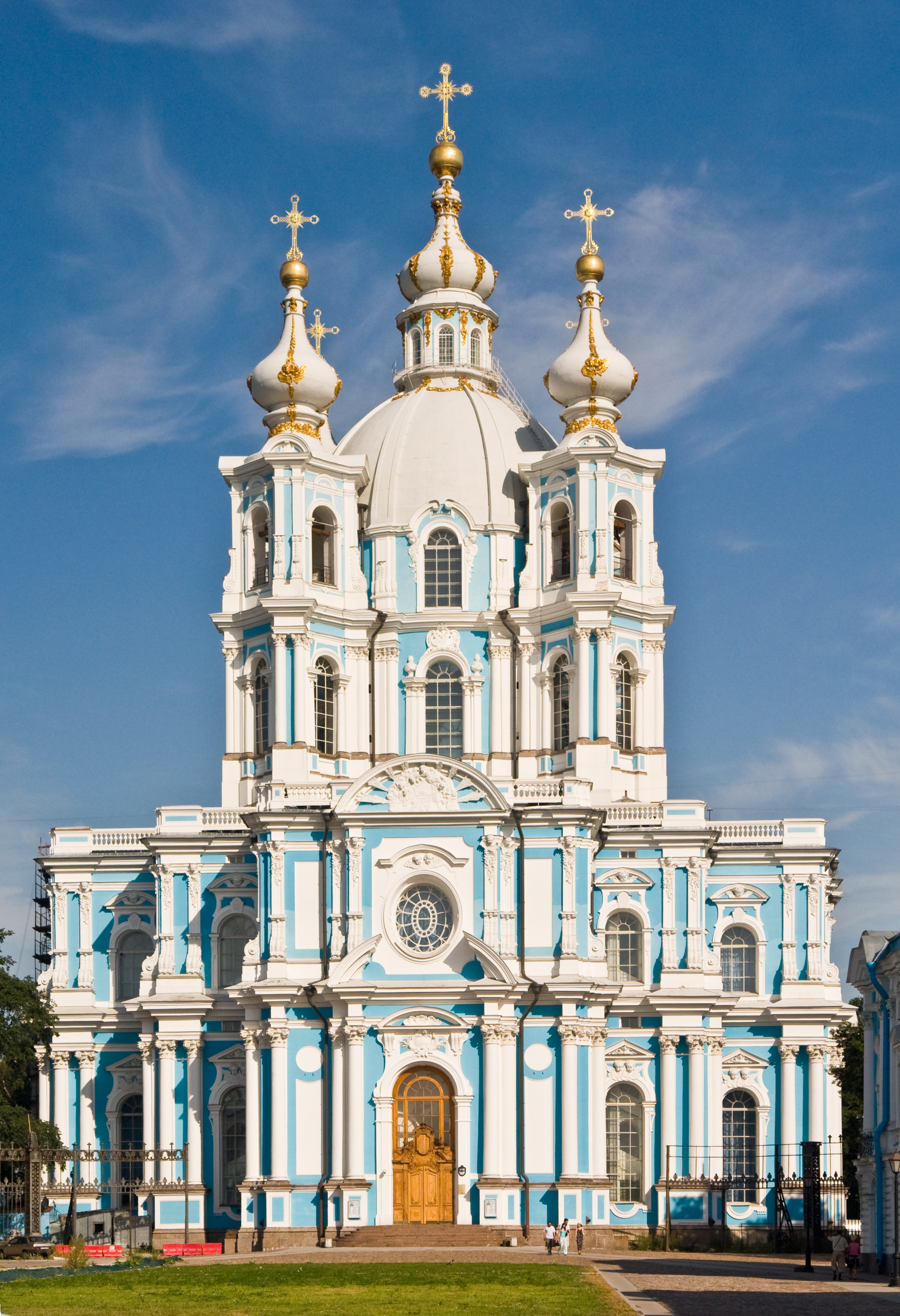
Smolny Cathedral from Smolny Convent in Saint Petersburg, Elisabethan Baroque style

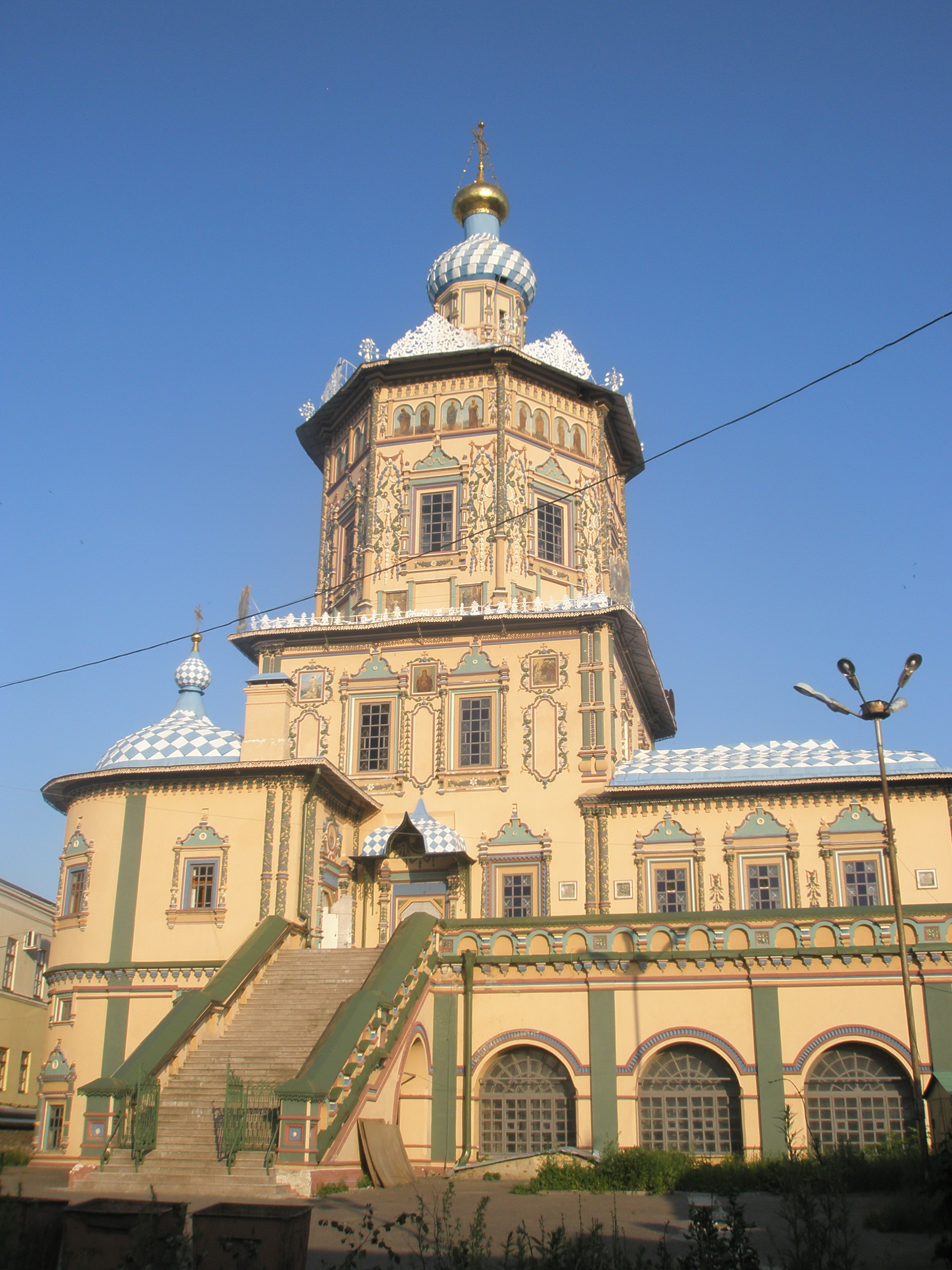
Saints Peter and Paul Cathedral (Kazan), an example of Naryshkin Baroque

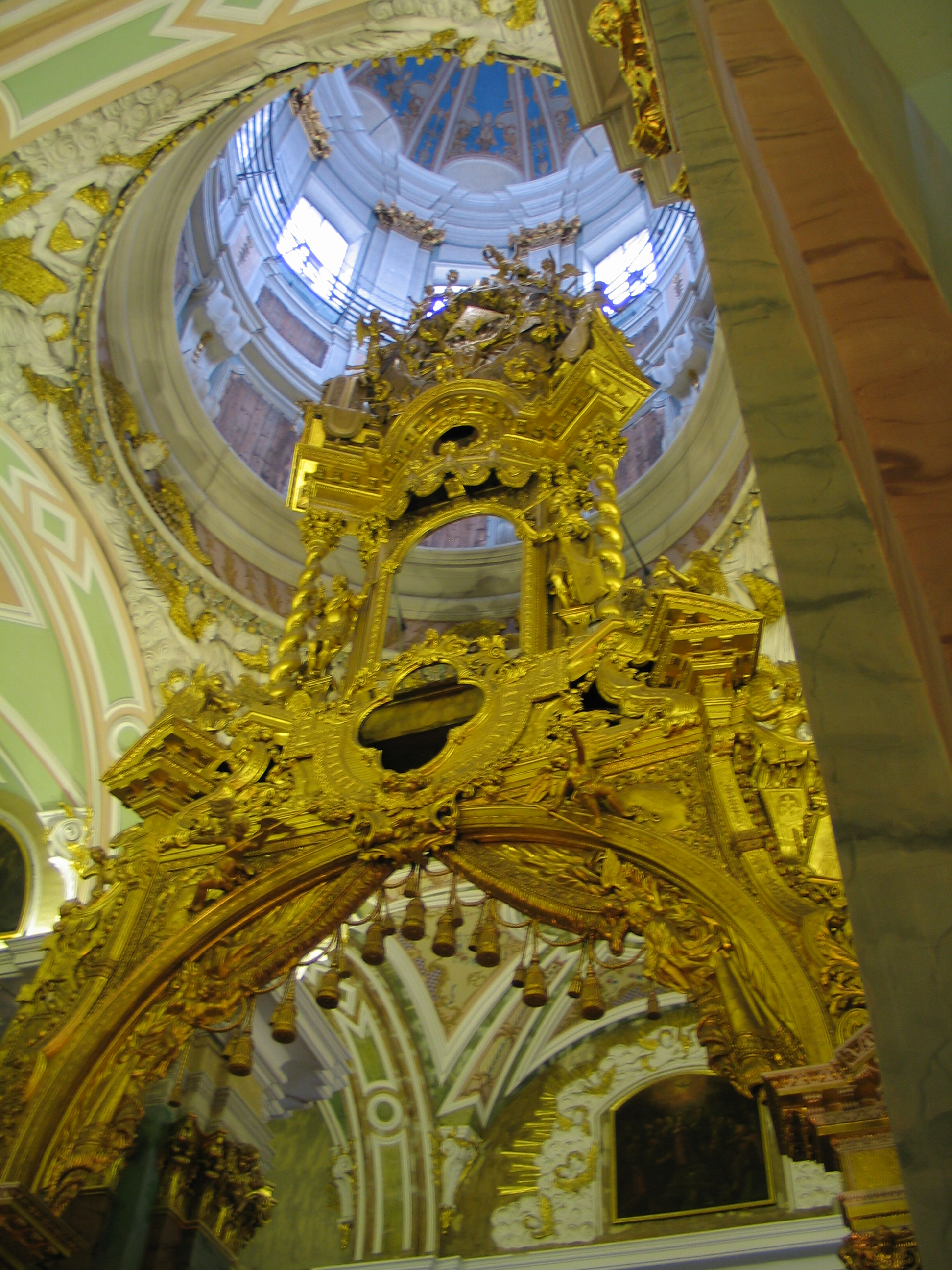
The interior of the Saint Petersburg Peter and Paul Cathedral, Petrine Baroque

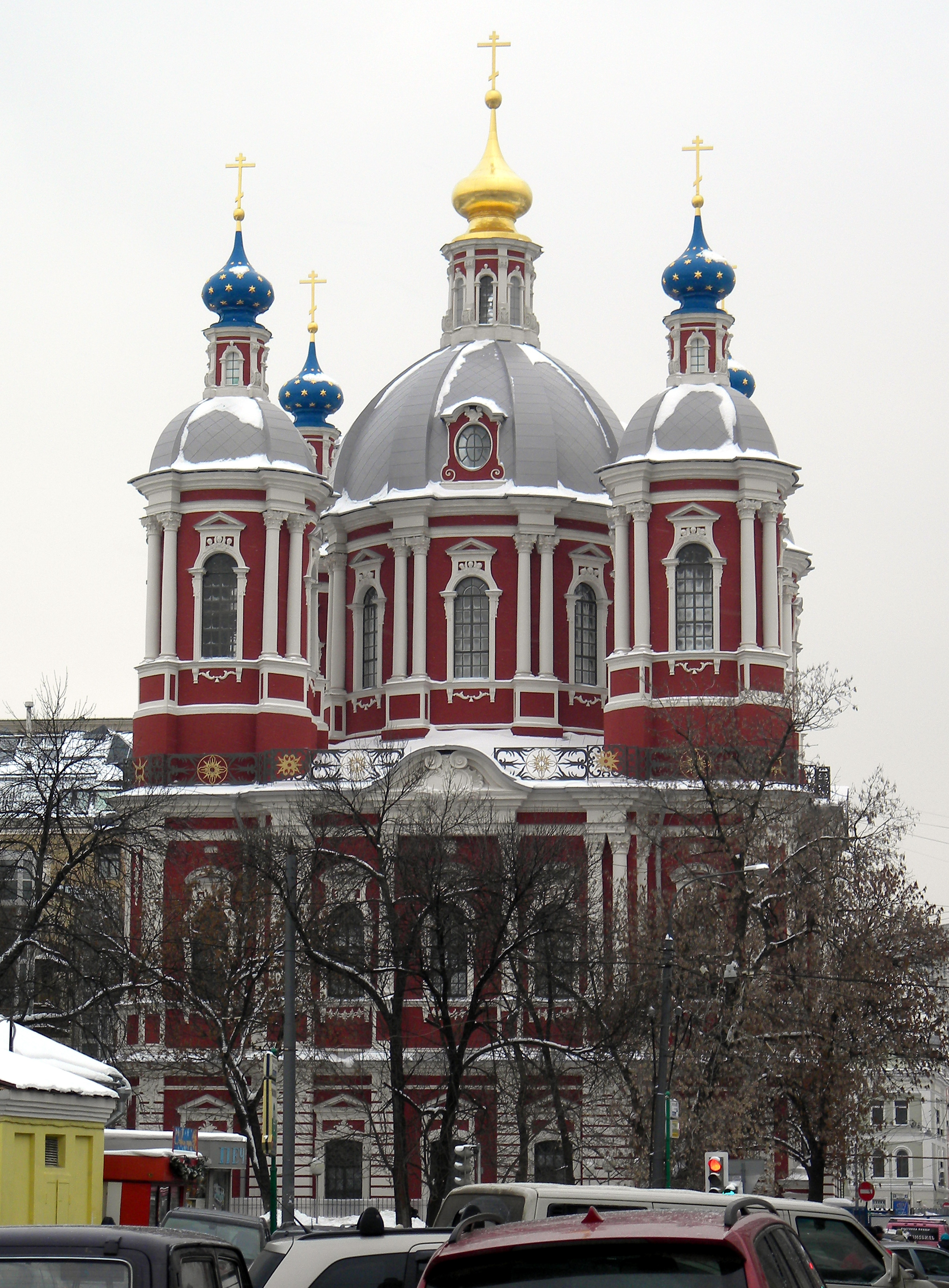
St Clement's Church, Moscow, Moscow Baroque

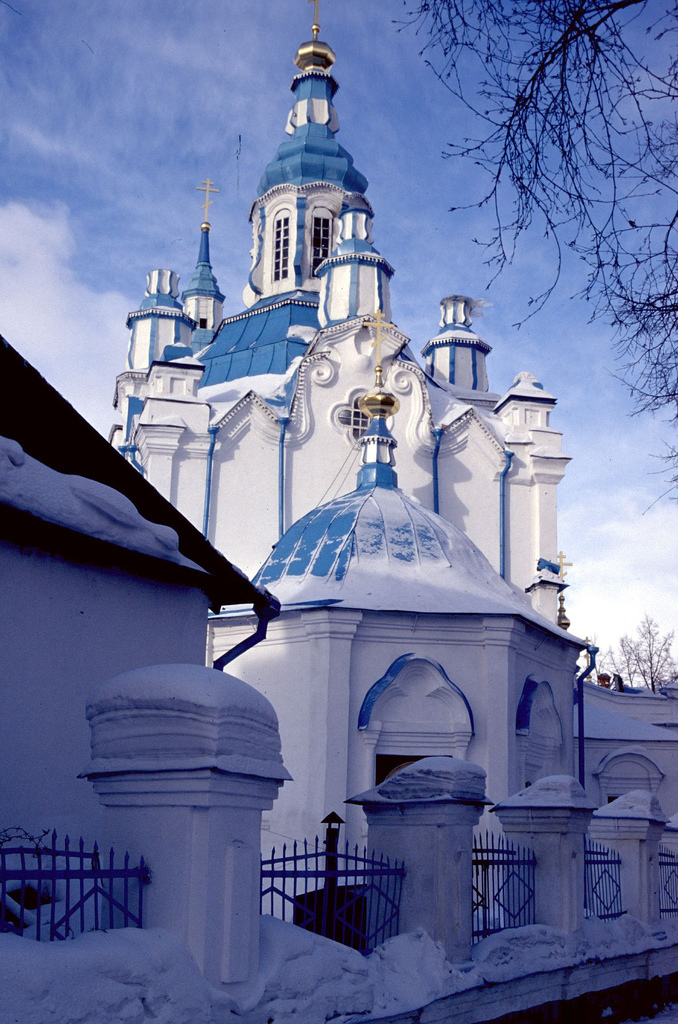
Cathedral of the Theotokos of the Sign in Tyumen, Siberian Baroque

=== Rococo ===
The Rococo style is a late evolution of Baroque architecture, first apparent in French domestic architecture and design. It is distinguished by the asymmetry found within its decoration, generally taking the form of ornate sculptured cartouches or borders. These decorations are loosely based on organic objects, particularly seashells and plant growth, but also on other natural forms that have an apparent "organised chaos" such as waves of clouds. The churches that are thus decorated may have strongly Baroque architectural form but a general lightness and delicacy of appearance, sometimes described as "playfulness". A number of pilgrimage churches in Bavaria, Germany, are of this style, most notably the Basilica of the Fourteen Holy Helpers (Vierzehnheiligen) near Bamberg by Johann Balthasar Neumann, the master and arguably the originator of the style. This combines a relatively staid exterior with a dynamic internal plan and an exquisitely orchestrated decorative scheme of painted ceiling and figurative sculpture, all set in a diverse array of gilded Rococo cartouches. Externally, the façade has a rippling surface, and rises with increasing ornateness to fanciful cupolas that are a hallmark of the churches of Bavaria and much of central and Eastern Europe.

Perhaps the most remarkable large-scale example of Rococo church buildings is the Dresden Frauenkirche, recently rebuilt after its near-total destruction during World War II. The entire structure embodies a dynamic, skyward surging motion, which combined with a delicacy of architectural detail, is typical of the Rococo style. The church is dominated by its bell-shaped cupola which imitates a form found on countless church towers in the region, recreated here not in wood sheathed with metal, but as a mighty masonry dome.

Rococo churches

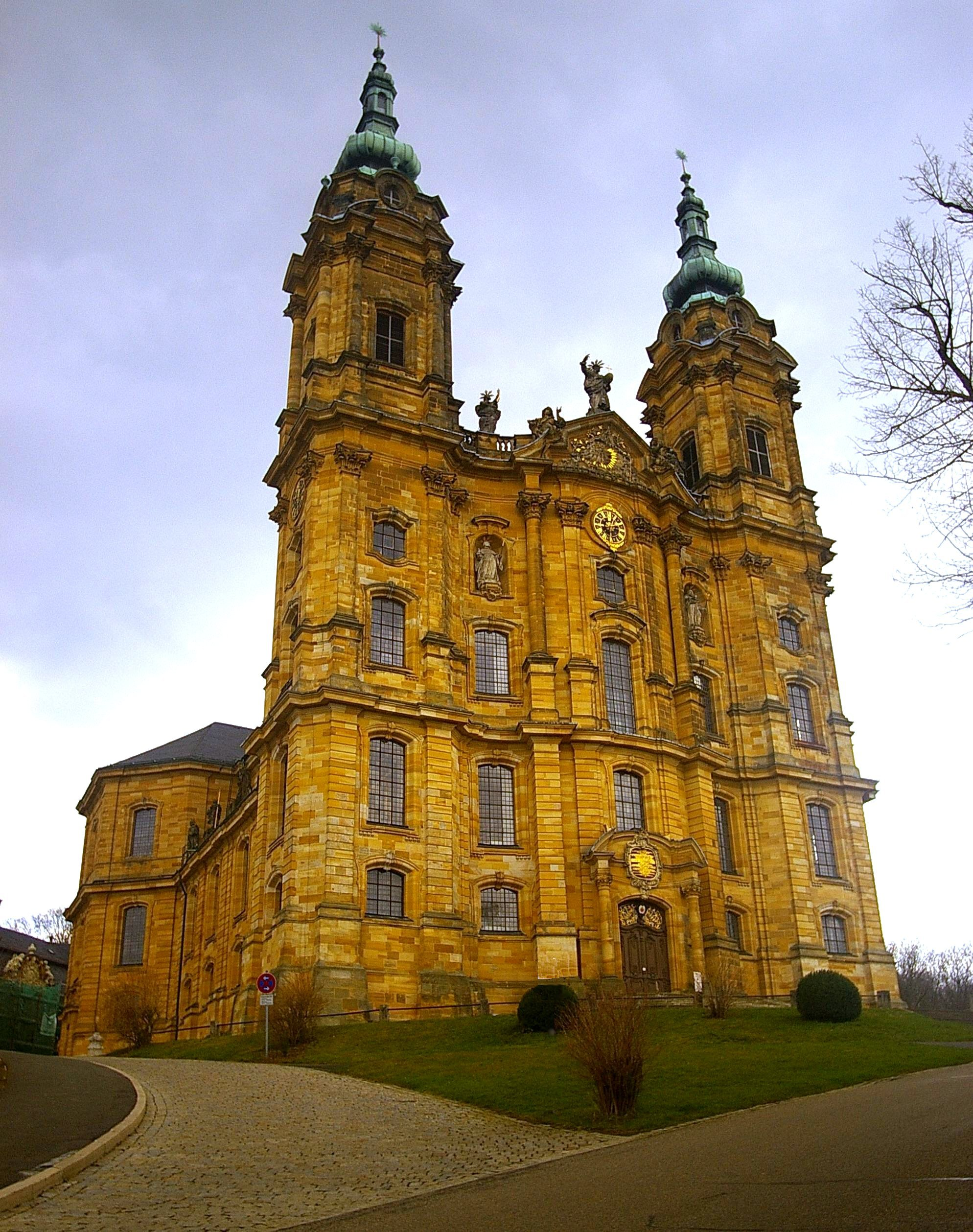
The Basilica of the Vierzehnheiligen, Germany

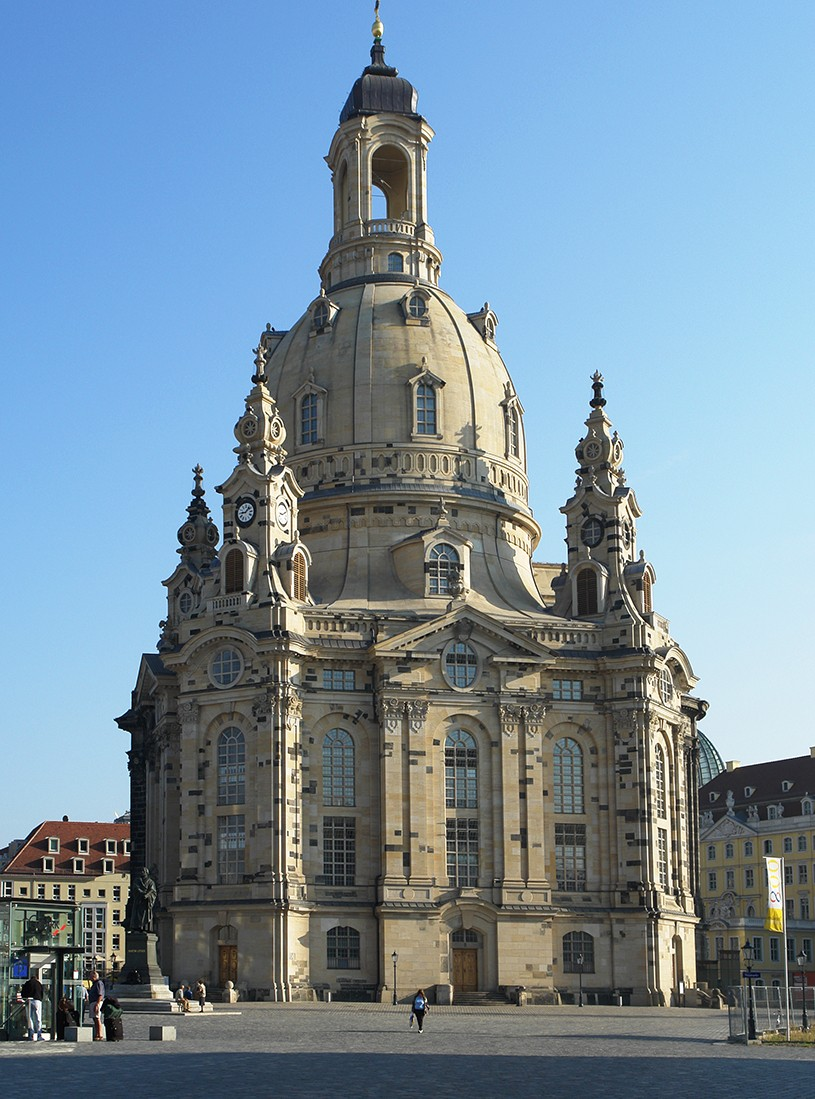
The restored Frauenkirche, Dresden, Germany

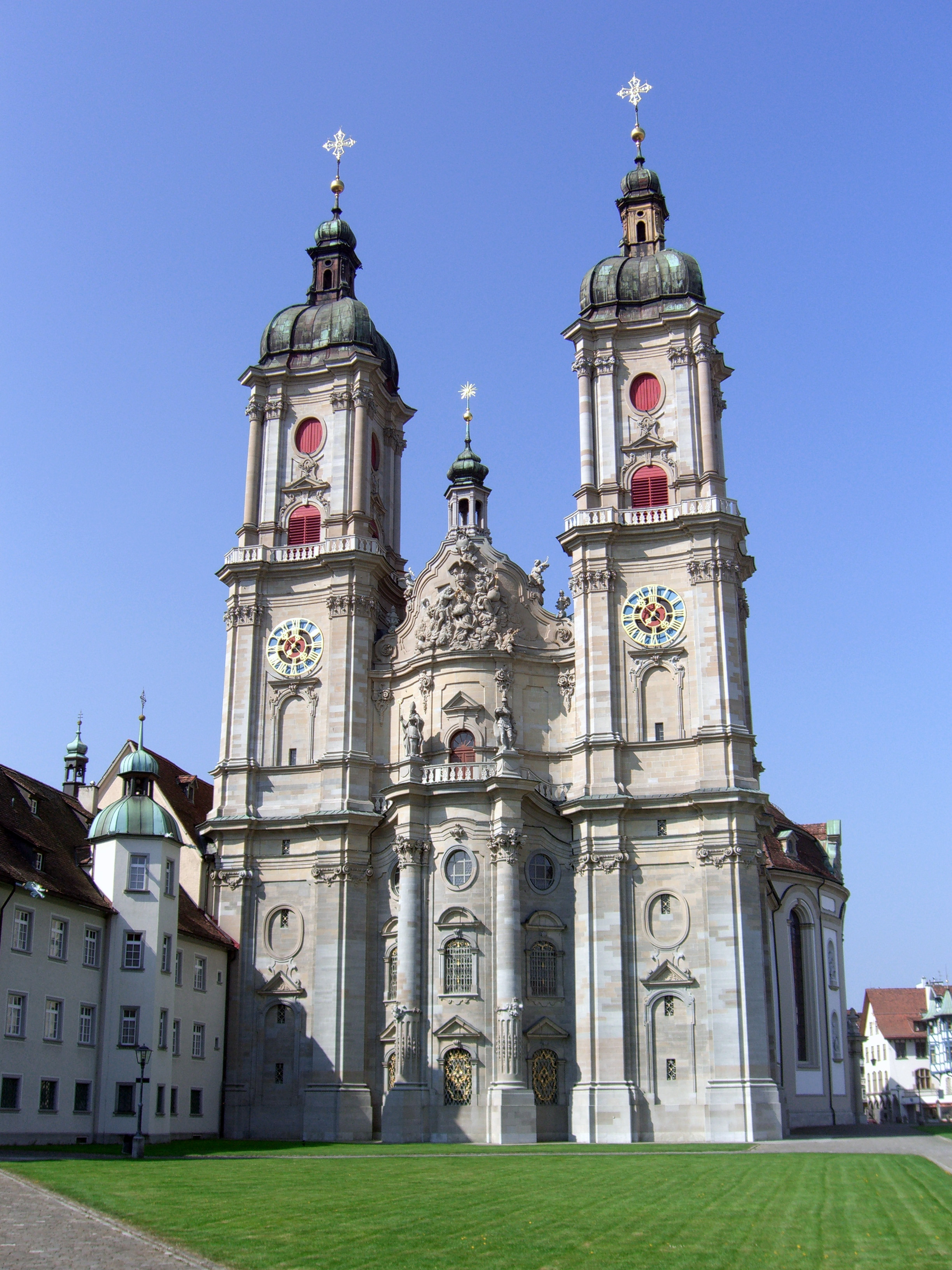
Abbey of Saint Gall, St. Gallen, Switzerland
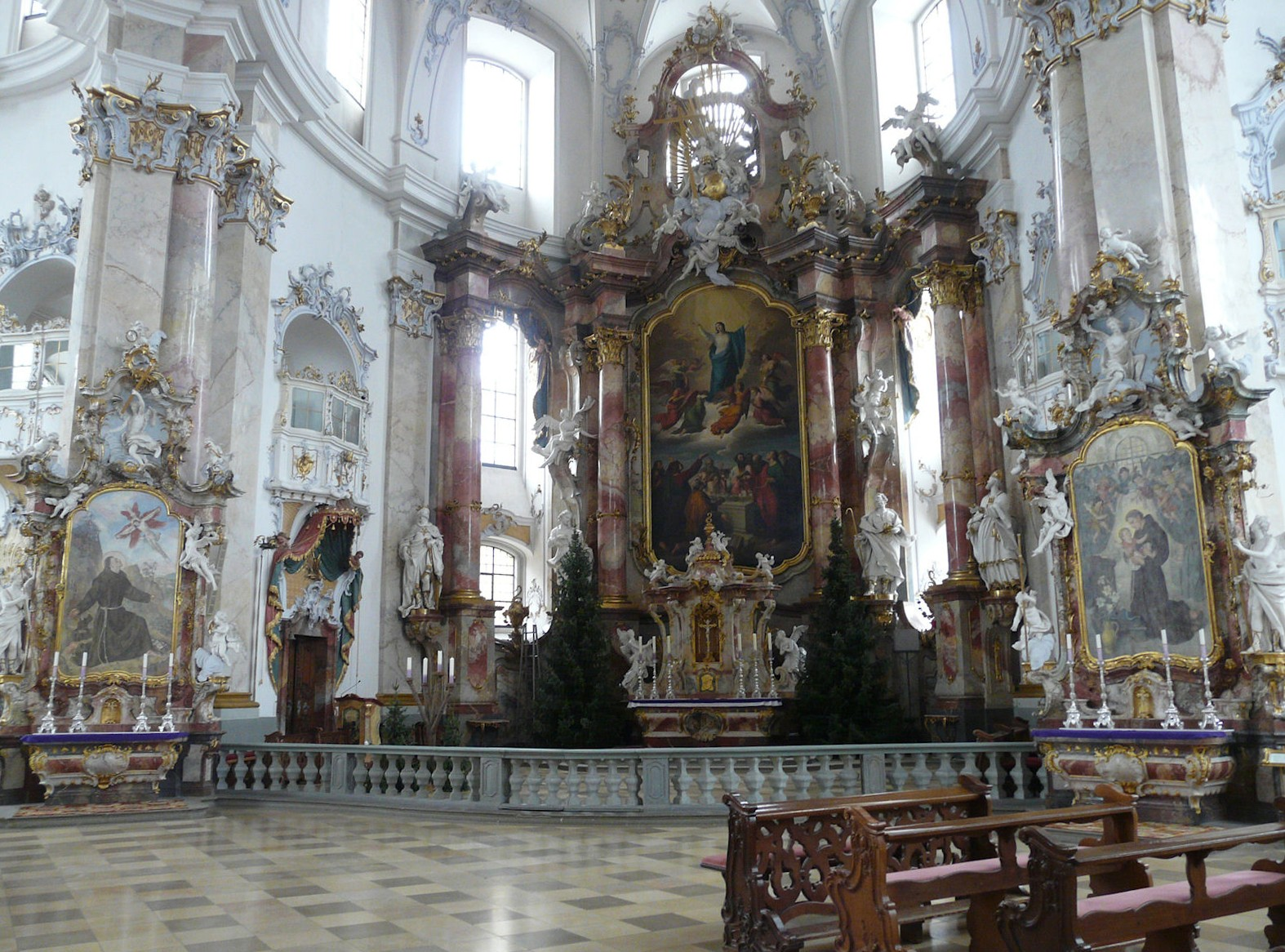
The altar of the Seven Holy Helpers, Vierzehnheiligen, Germany

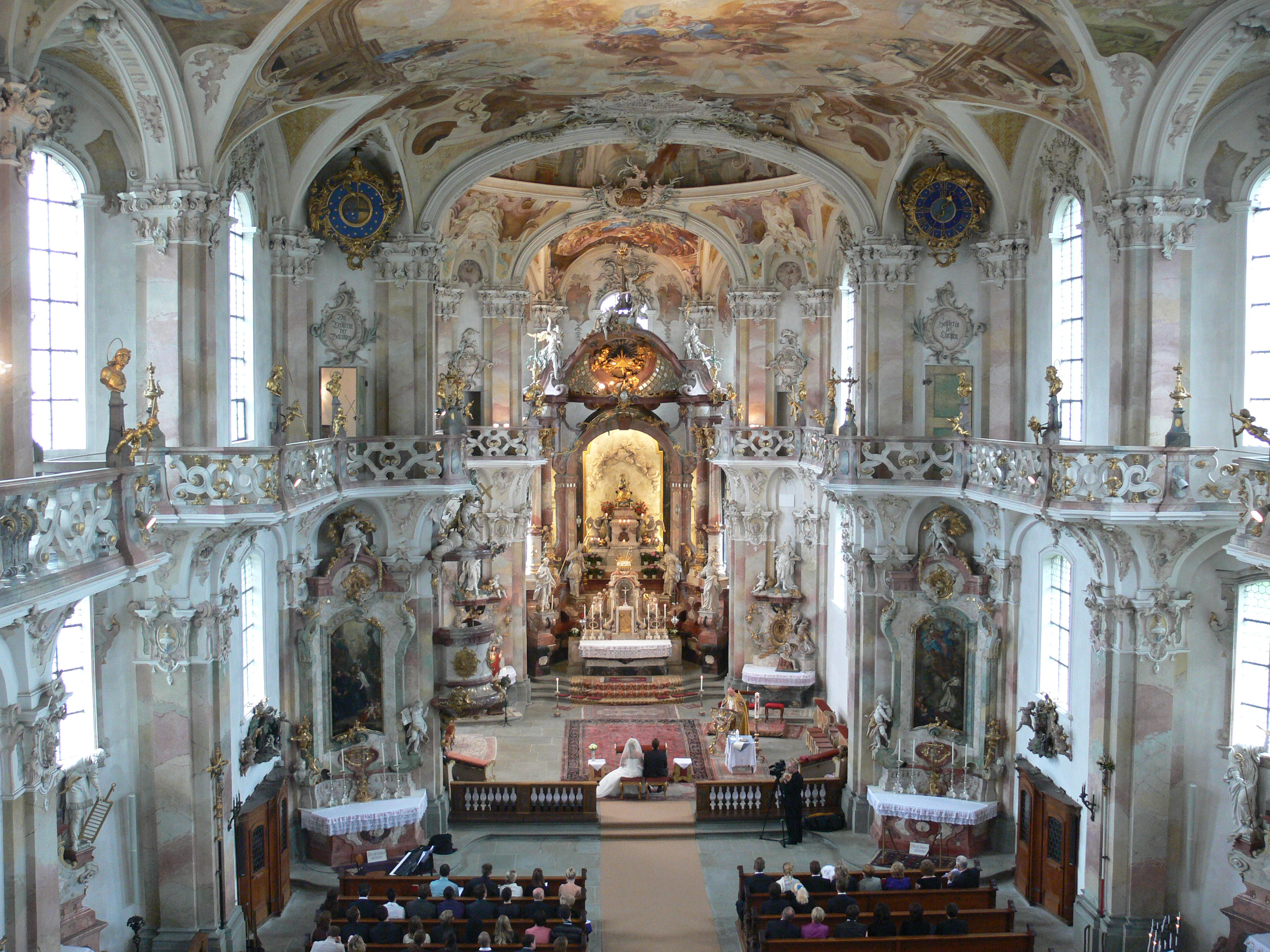
The Abbey Church at Birnau, during a wedding

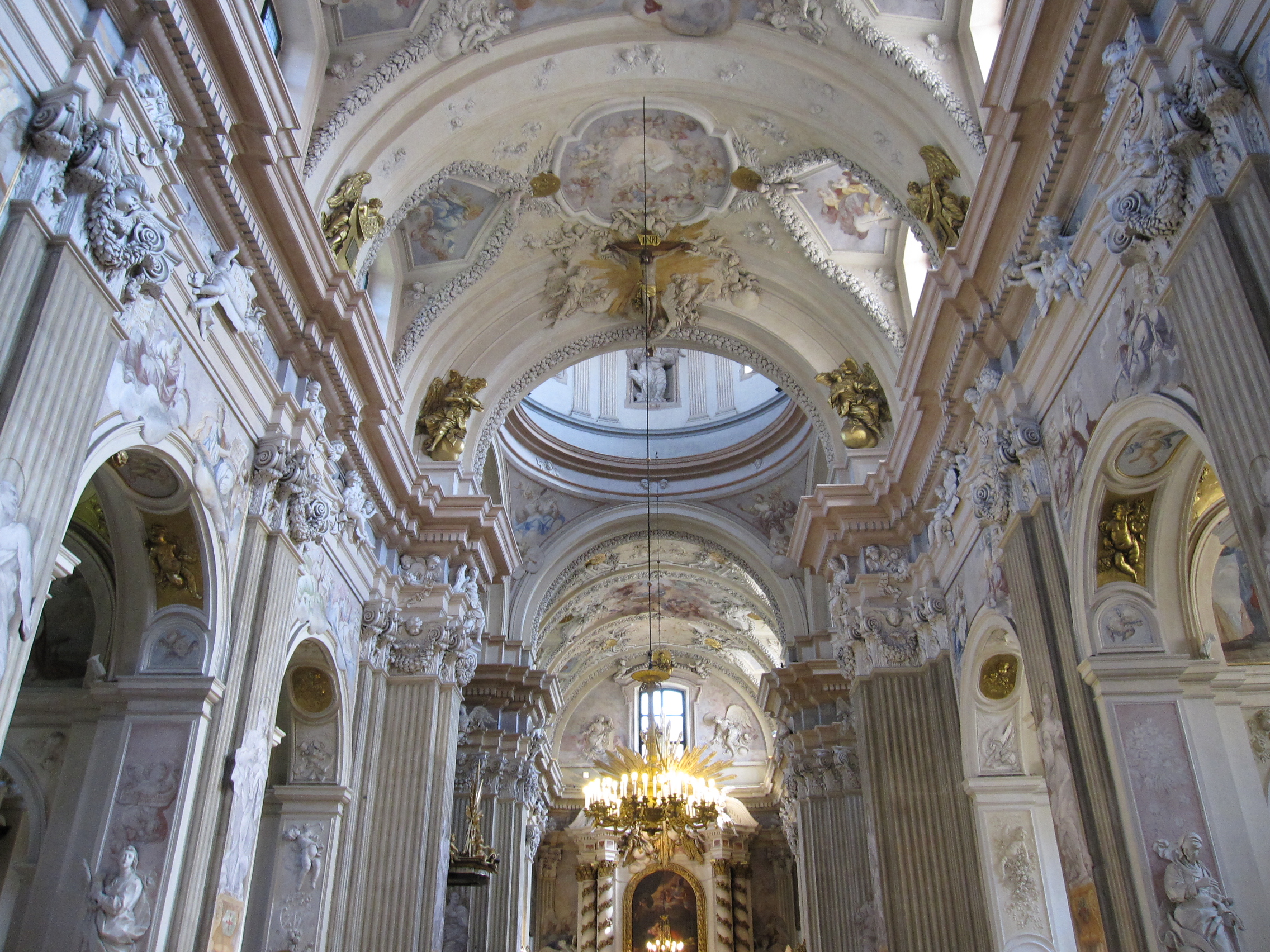
Pilasters, cornice and vault of St Anne's Church, Kraków, Poland
International Baroque and Rococo

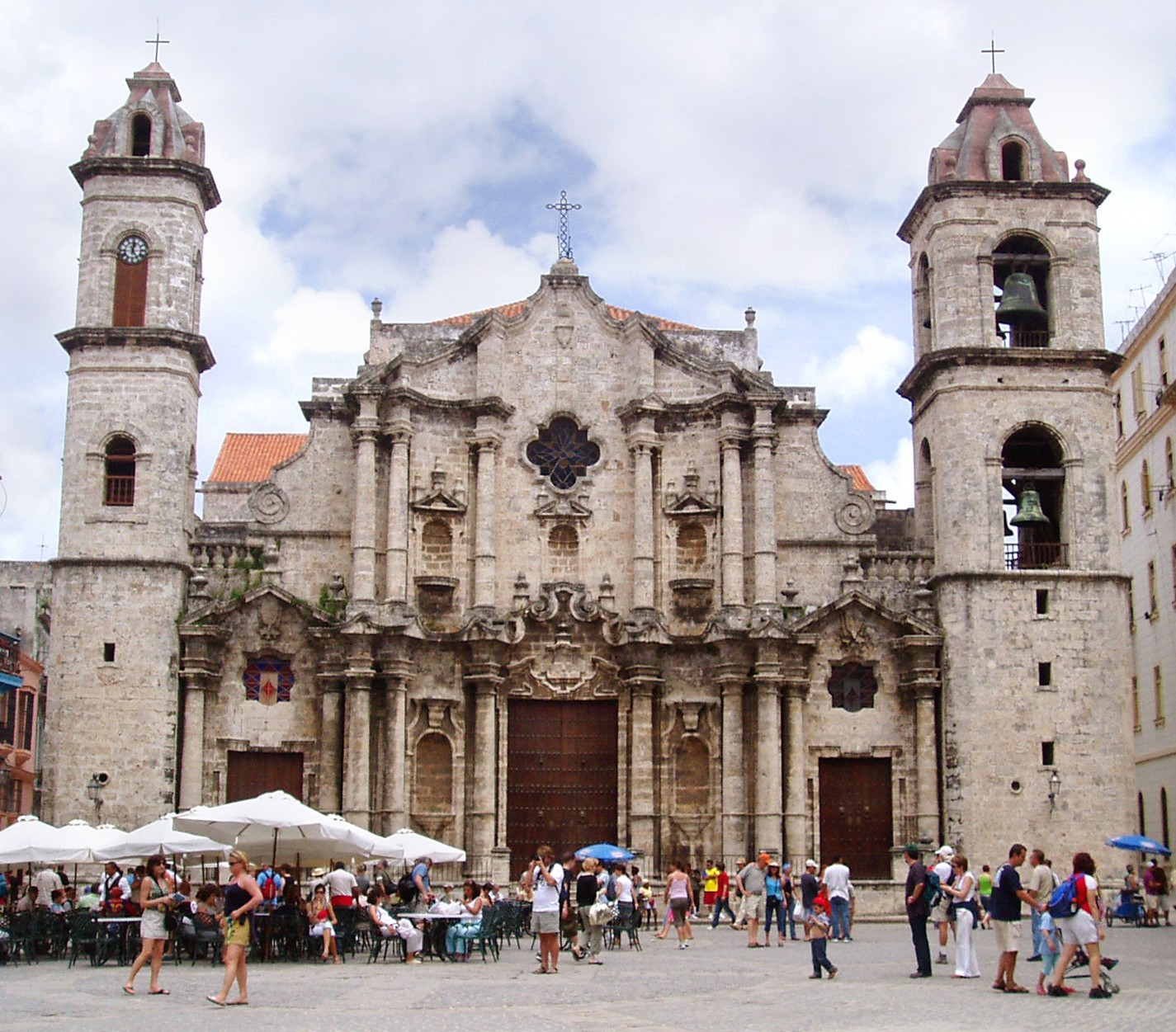
Havana Cathedral, Cuba, (1748–1777)

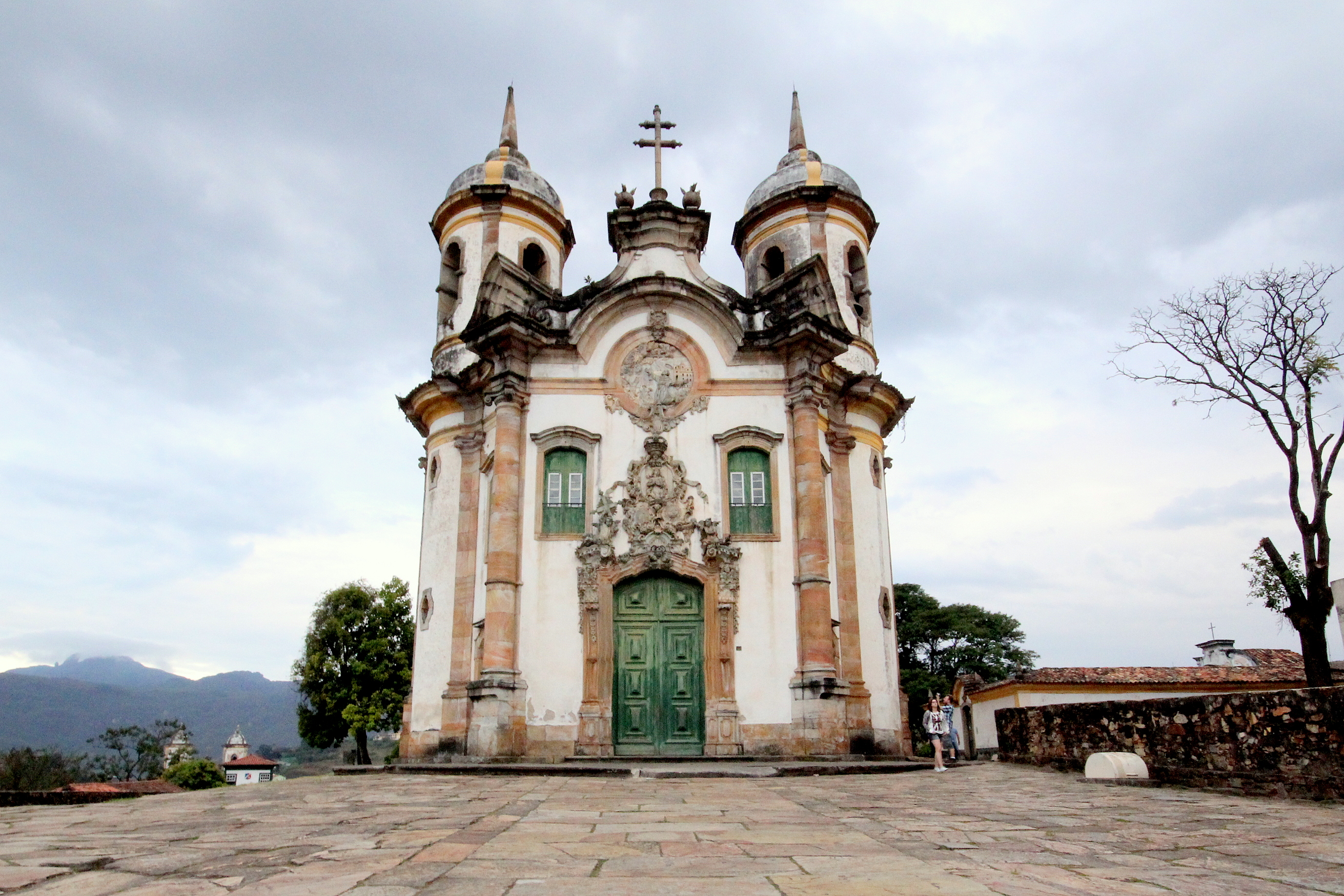
The Church of Saint Francis of Assisi in Ouro Preto, Brazil (1766)

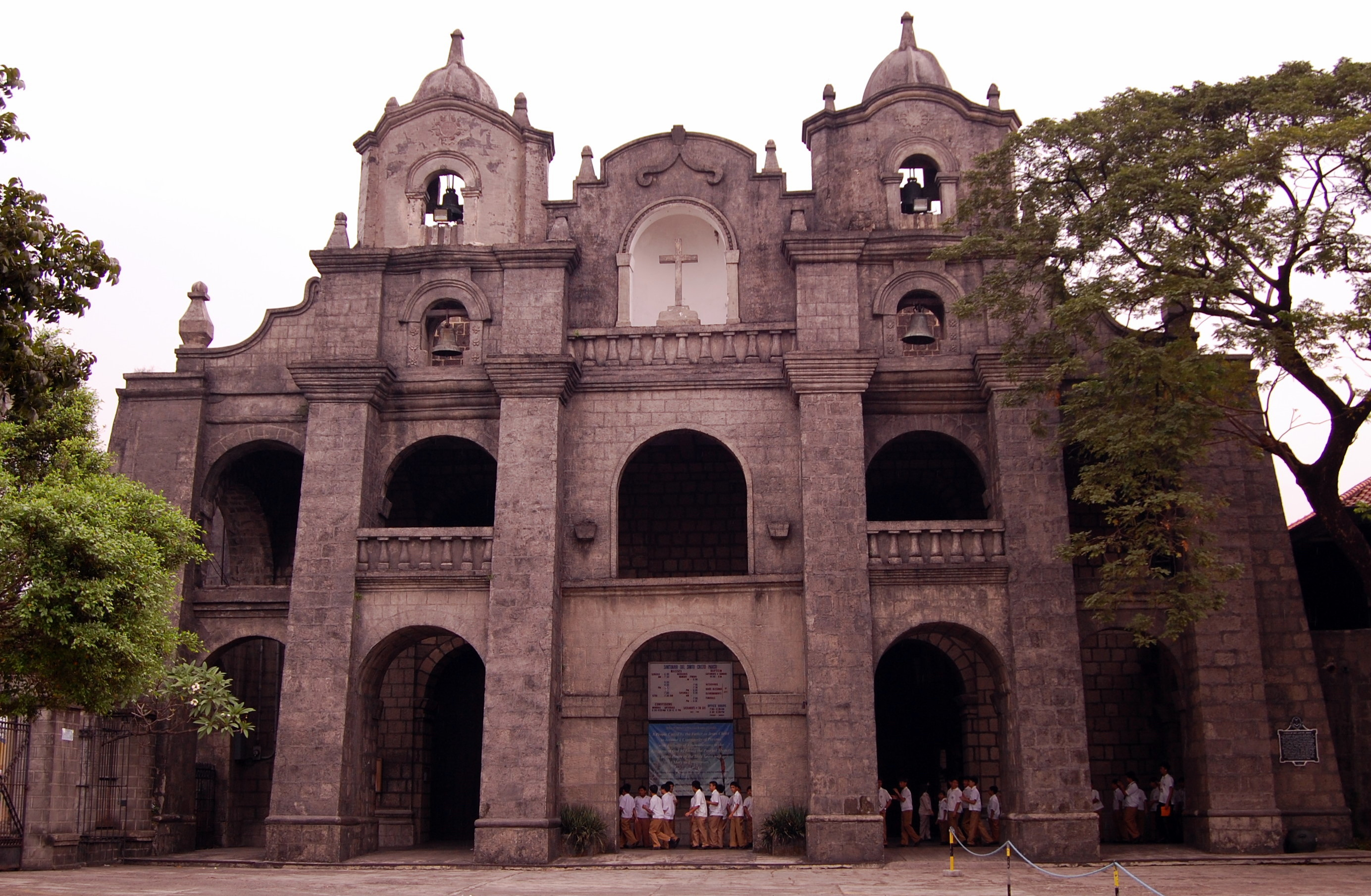
The Church of San Juan, Manila, Philippines (1774)

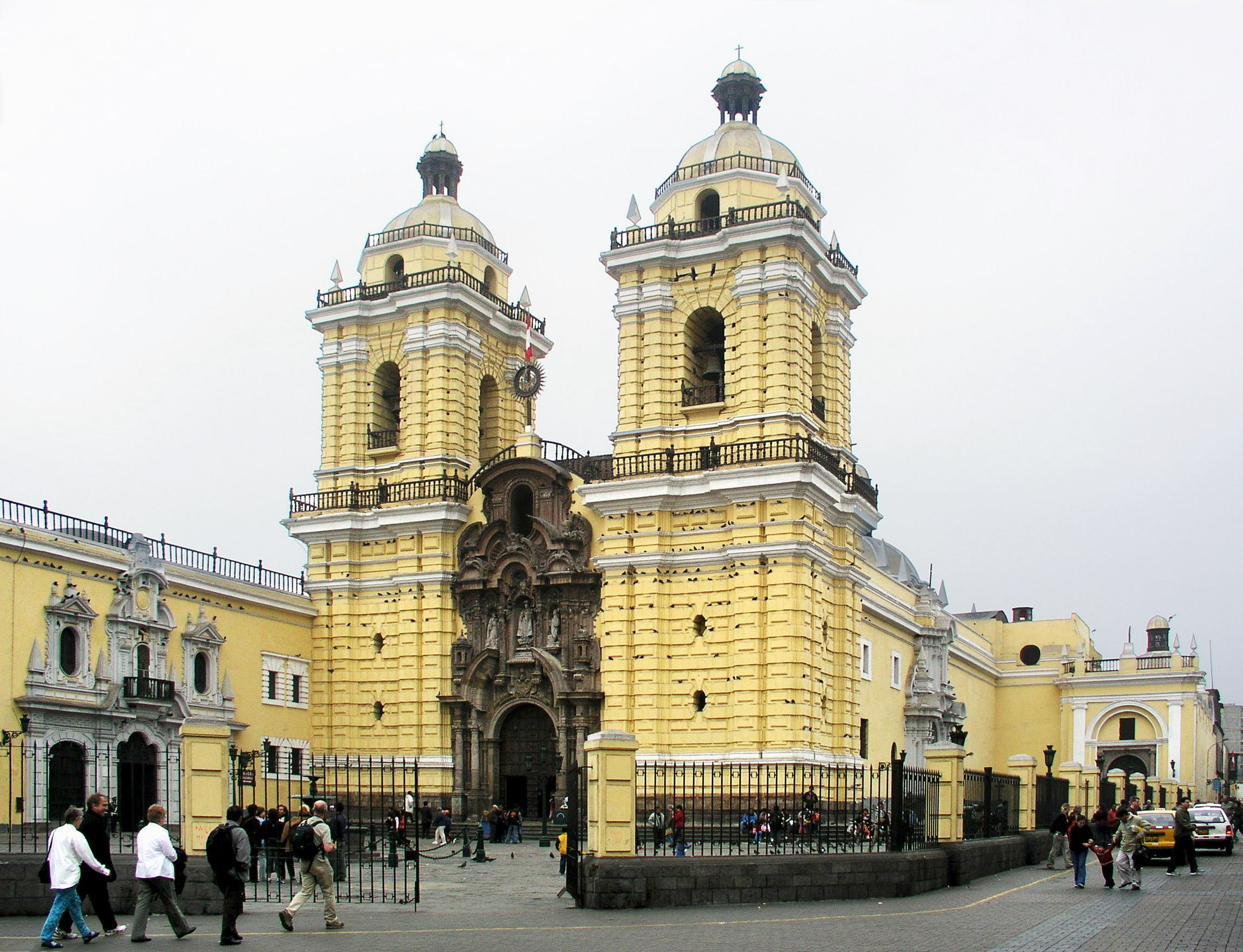
The Monastery of San Francisco, Lima, Peru (1774)

=== Revivals ===
The 18th and 19th centuries were a time of expansion and colonisation by Western Europeans. It was also a time of much Christian revival and in England, a considerable growth in the Roman Catholic Church. There was also much industrialisation and the growth of towns. New churches and cathedrals were needed. The Medieval styles, and particularly Gothic, were seen as the most suitable for the building of new cathedrals, both in Europe and in the colonies.

Cathedrals in the Gothic Revival style include Liverpool Anglican Cathedral in England, the New Cathedral, Linz in Austria, the Cathedral of St John the Divine in New York and St Patrick's Cathedral, Melbourne in Australia.

Not all of the cathedrals that are in a revivalist style are Gothic. Westminster Cathedral, the seat of the Roman Catholic Archbishop of Westminster, is an eclectic design of predominantly Byzantine style with polychrome walls, domes and a very tall Italian-style campanile. Mary, Queen of the World Cathedral in Canada is a Renaissance revival building based on St Peter's, Rome.

19th and 20th-century Revivals of classical styles

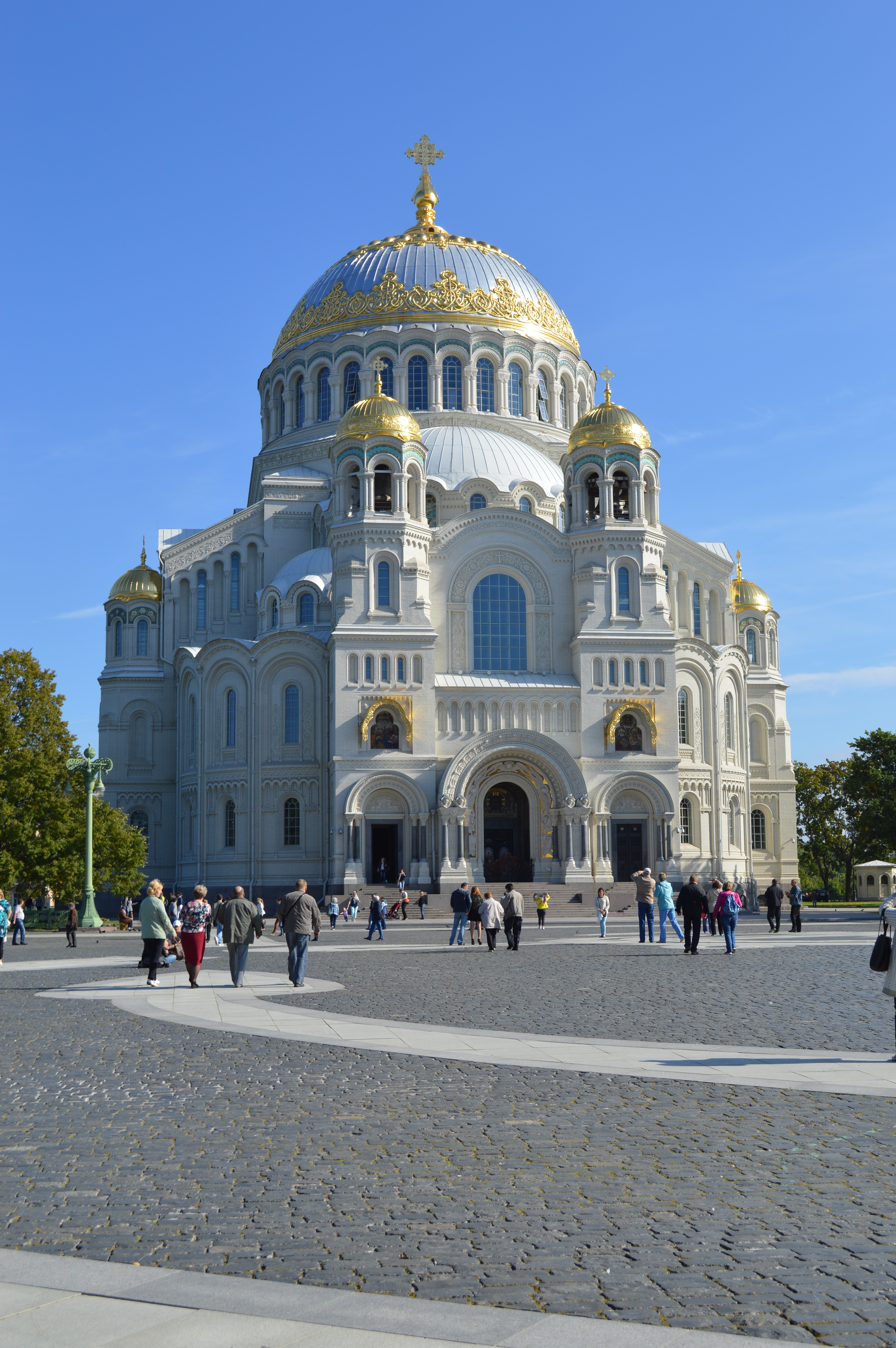
Kronstadt Naval Cathedral, Saint Petersburg Russia, (1903—1913) in the Neo-Byzantine style

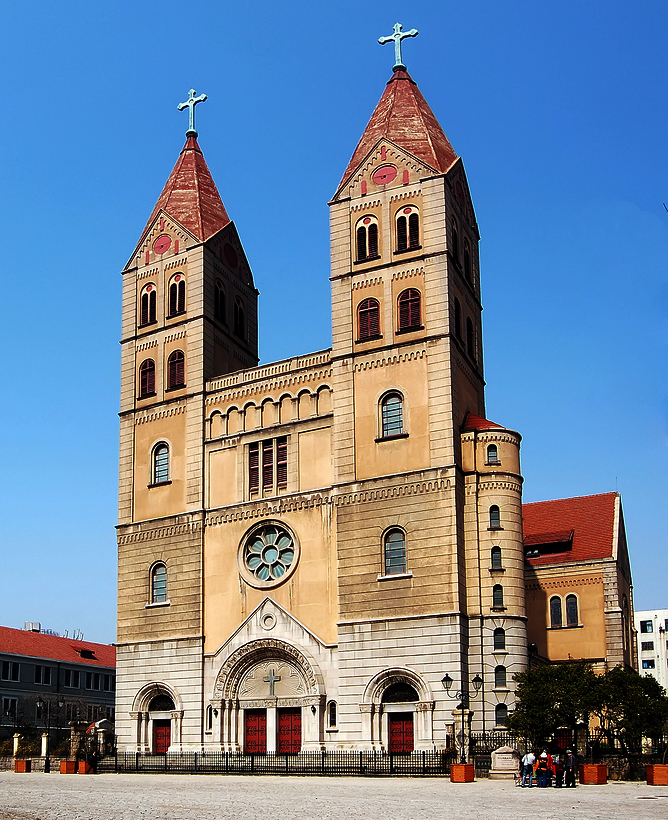
St. Michael's Cathedral, Qingdao, China, (1931–1934) in the German Romanesque style

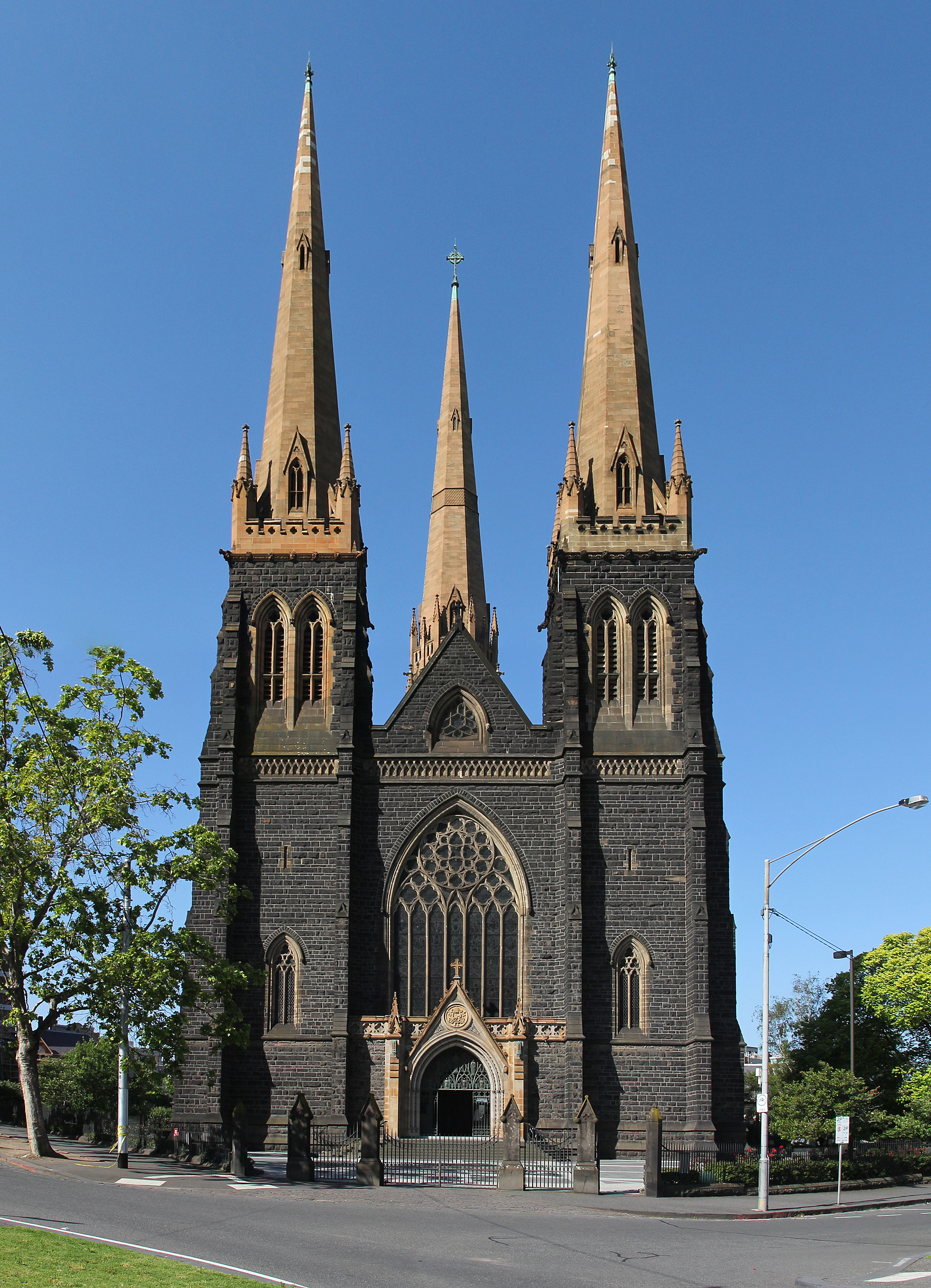
St Patrick's Cathedral, Melbourne, Australia, (1858–1897) in the Gothic style

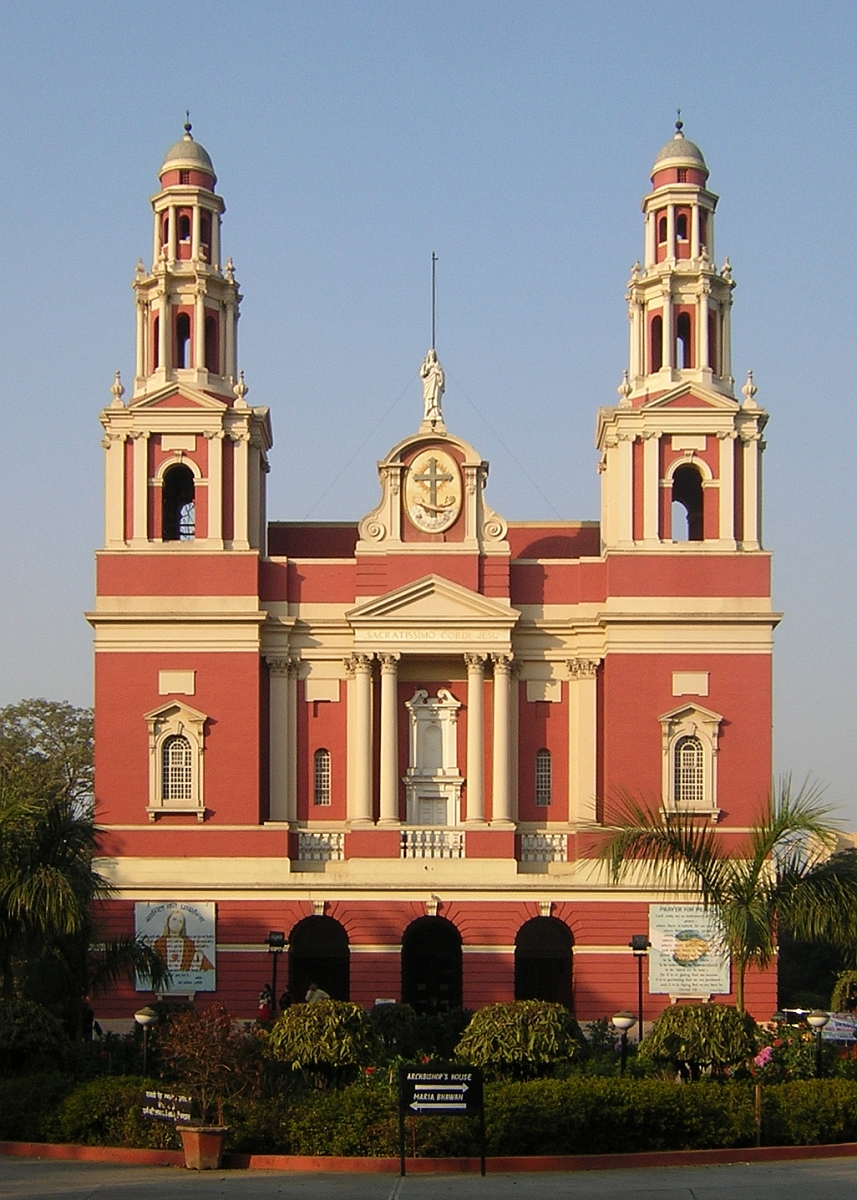
Sacred Heart Cathedral, Delhi, India, (1929–1930s) in the English Baroque style
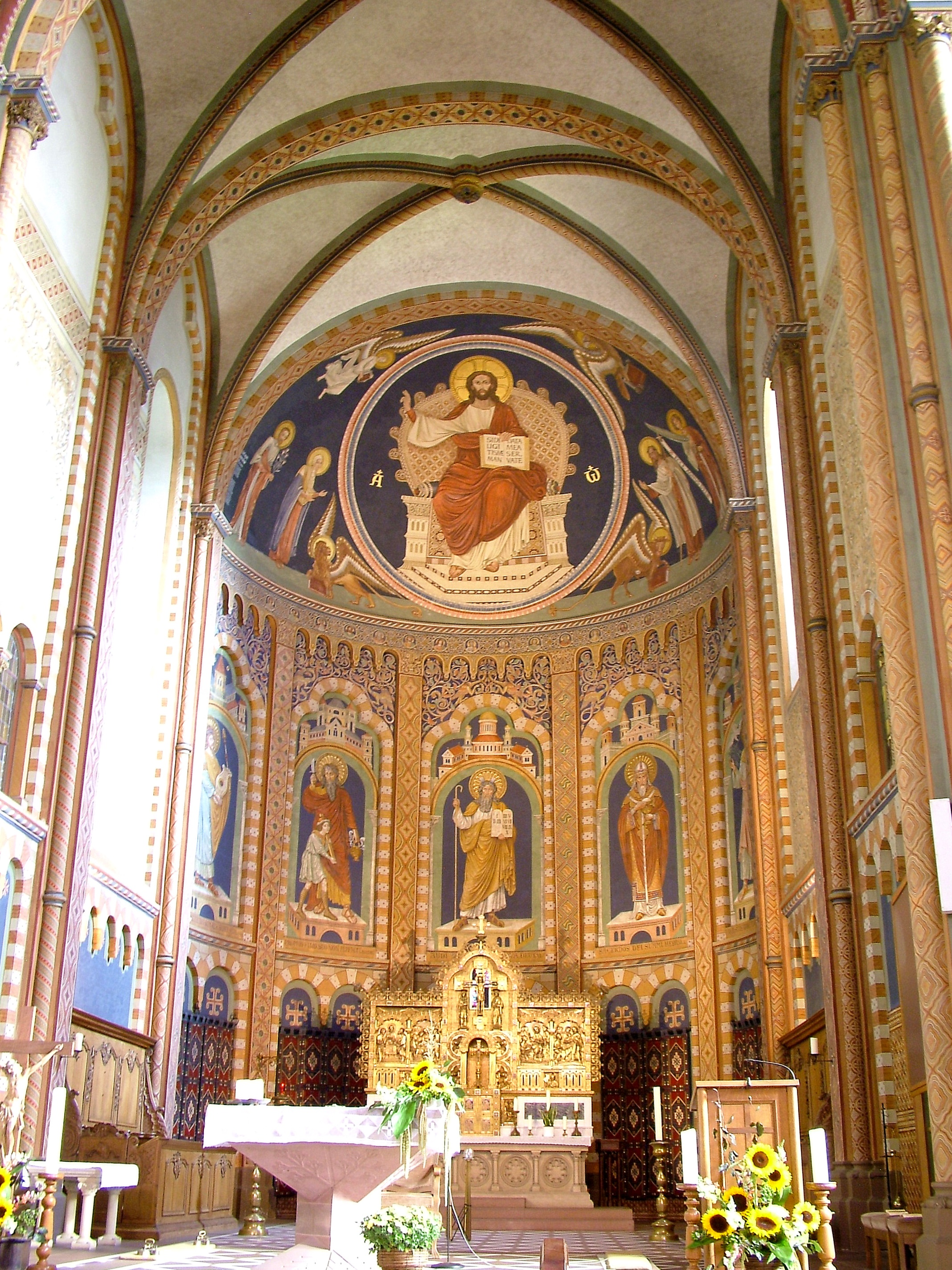
Church St. Pankraz at Anholt, Germany, in the Romanesque style

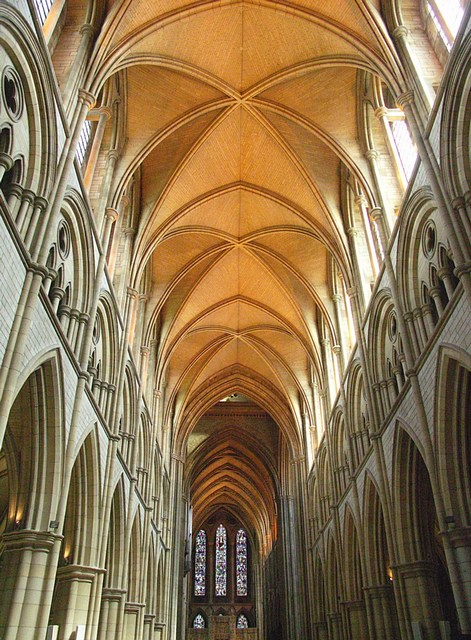
Truro Cathedral, England, in the Early English Gothic style

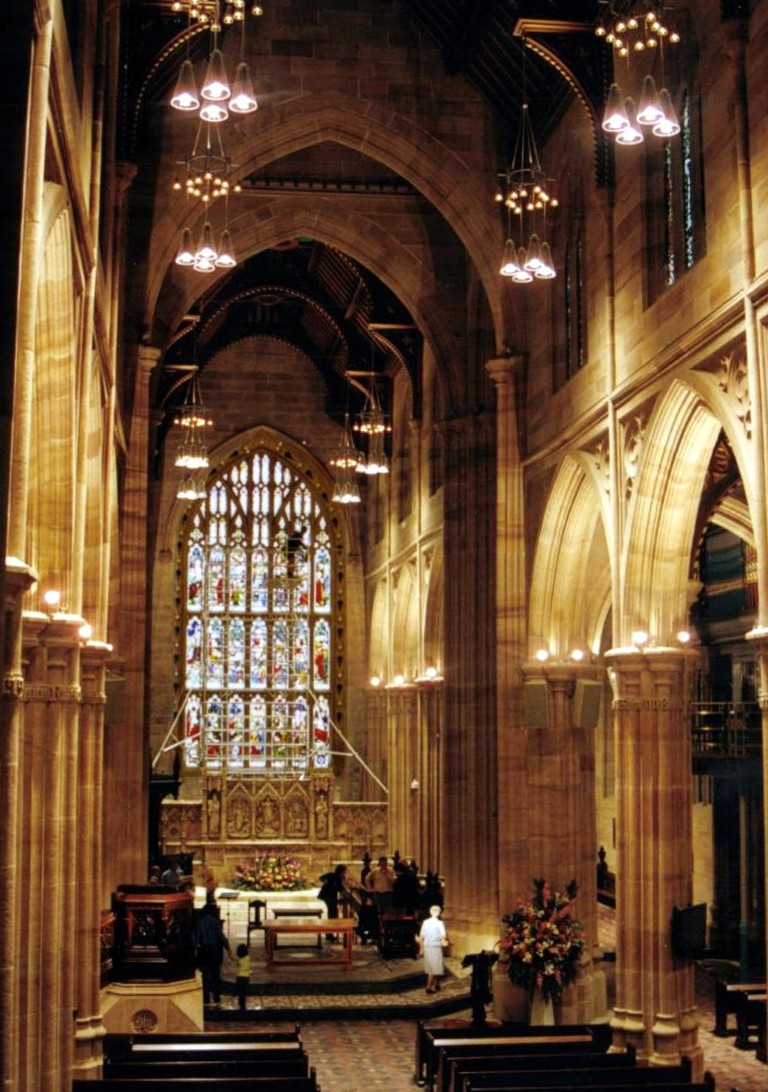
St. Andrew's Cathedral, Sydney, Australia, in the Perpendicular Gothic style

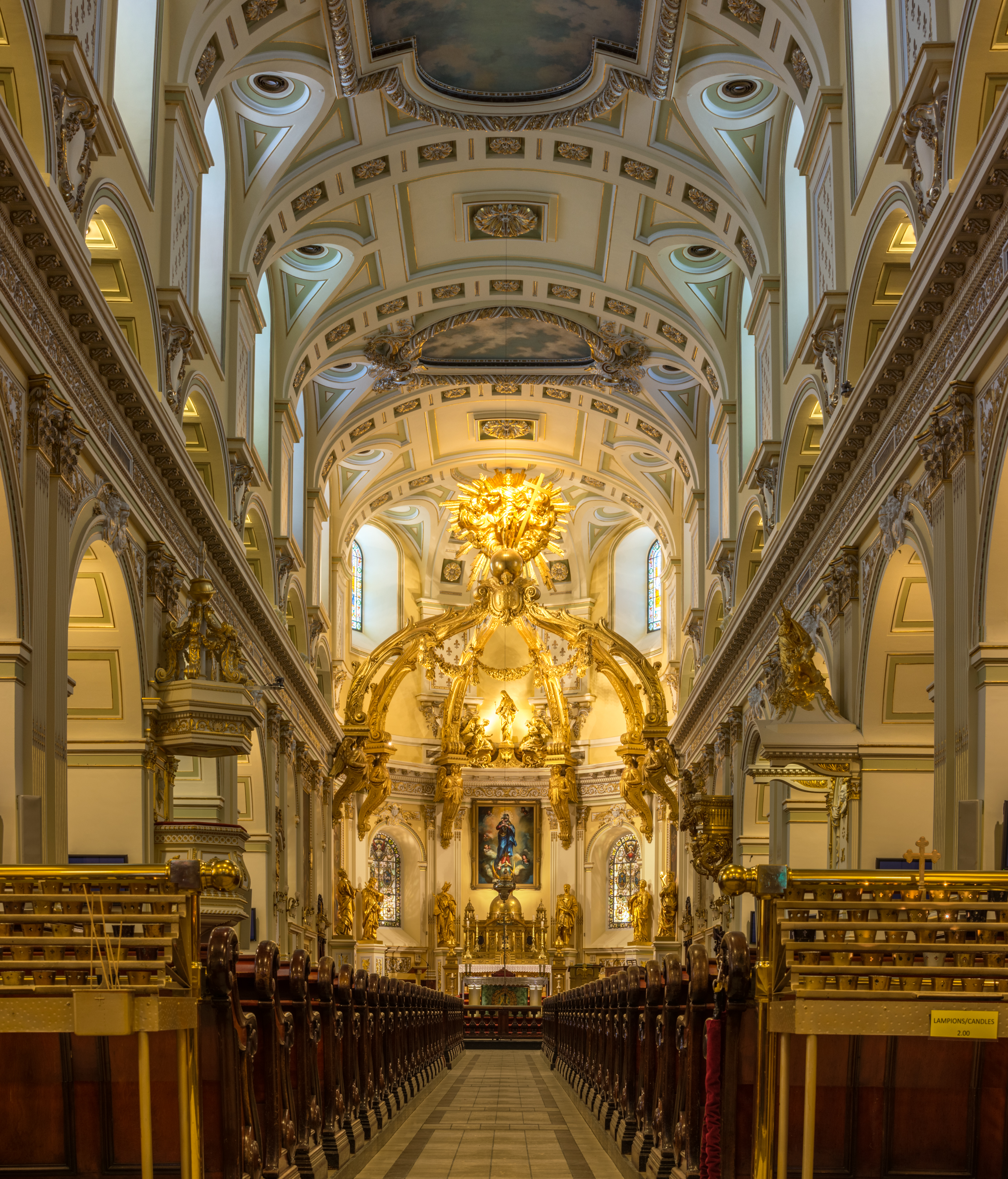
Notre-Dame de Québec Cathedral, Quebec City, Canada, in the Italian Baroque style

=== Modern ===
In the 20th century, building in the Medieval style continued, but in a stripped-down, cleanly functional form, often in brick. A fine example is Guildford Cathedral in England. Another is Armidale Anglican Cathedral in Australia.

After World War II traditionalist ideas were abandoned for the rebuilding of the bombed cathedral in Coventry. The old cathedral was actually a large parish church that had been elevated to cathedral status. Its glorious spire fortunately escaped severe damage. The 20th century Coventry Cathedral, of alternating slabs of masonry and stained glass attempts to capture symbolically the sense of an old cathedral church, without attempting to reproduce it. Liverpool Metropolitan Cathedral is the 20th century's answer to the centrally planned church, a vast circular structure with the sanctuary at the centre.

20th-century Modernism

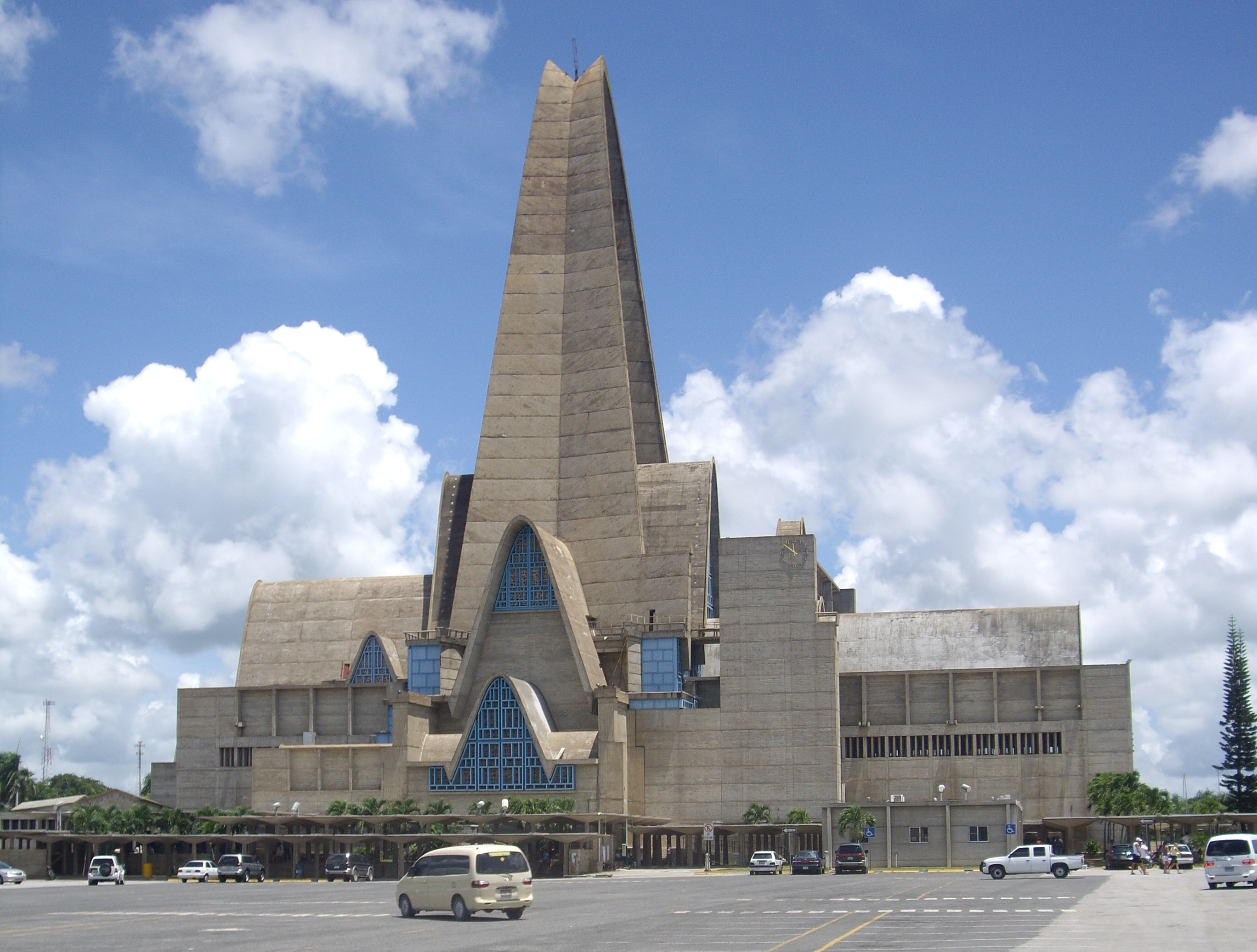
The Basilica of Our Lady of Altagracia, Dominican Republic

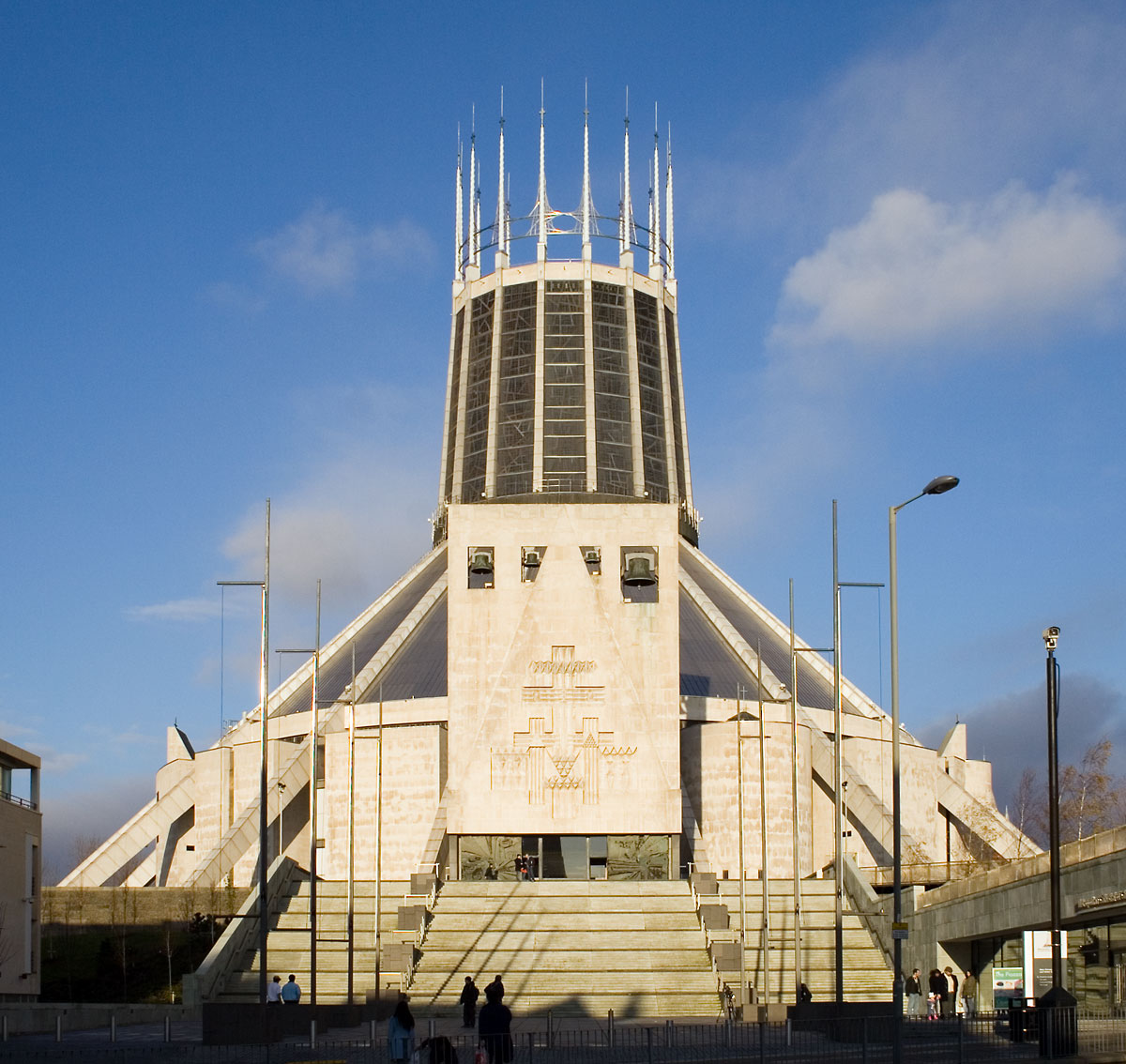
Liverpool Metropolitan Cathedral, by Sir Frederick Gibberd, 1967

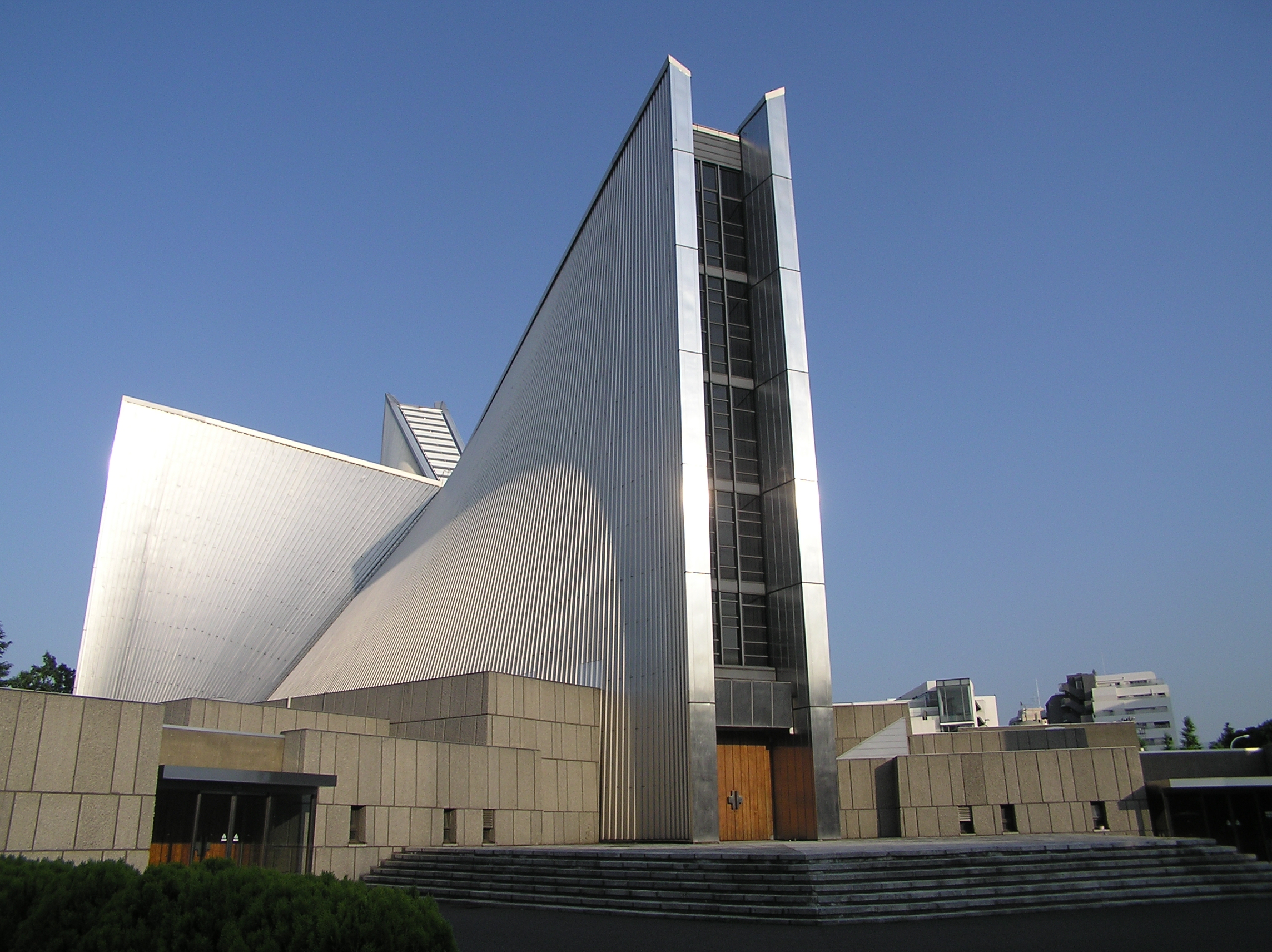
Tokyo Cathedral, Japan

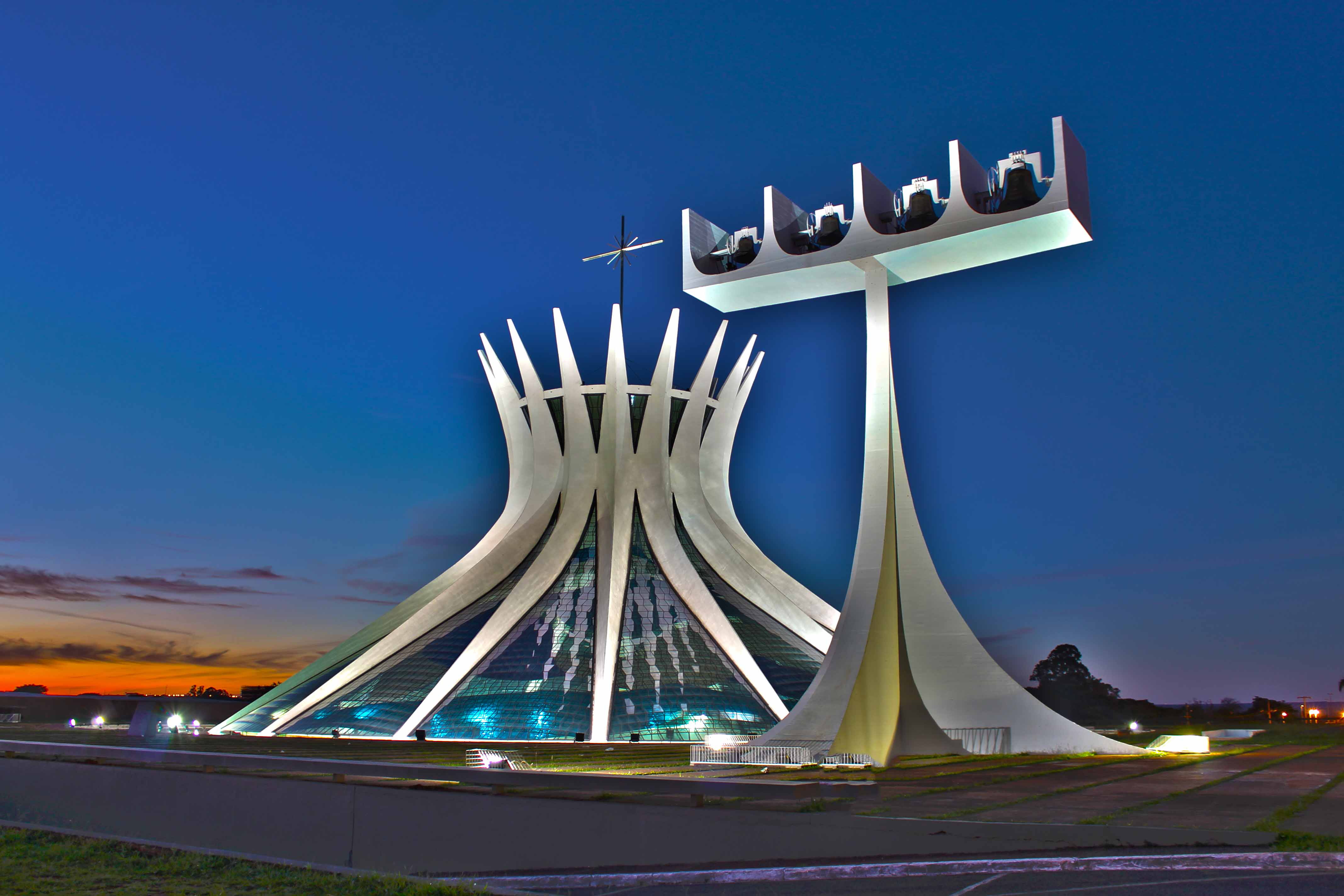
Cathedral of Brasília, Brazil
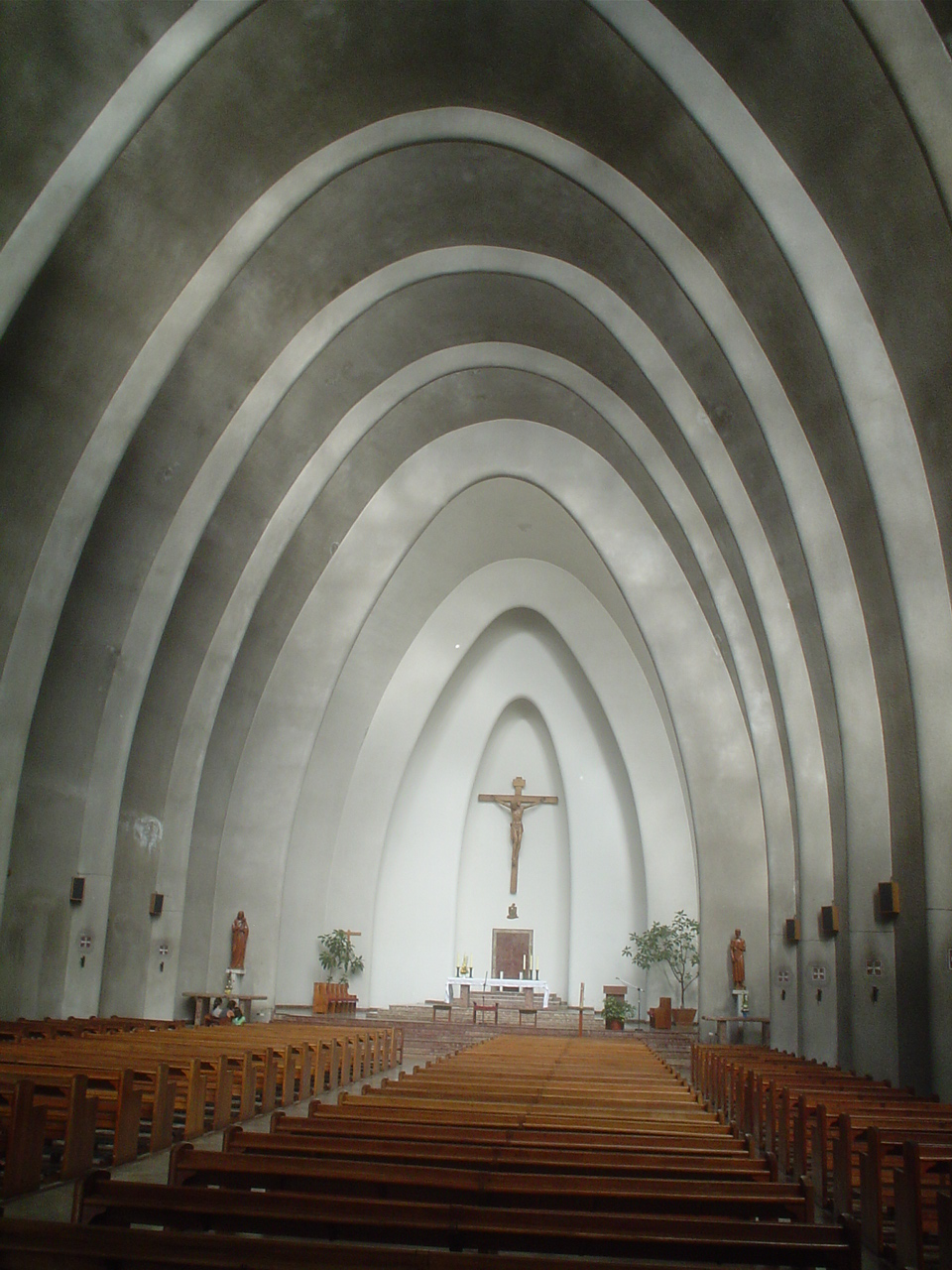
Interior of the Cathedral of Chillán, Chile.

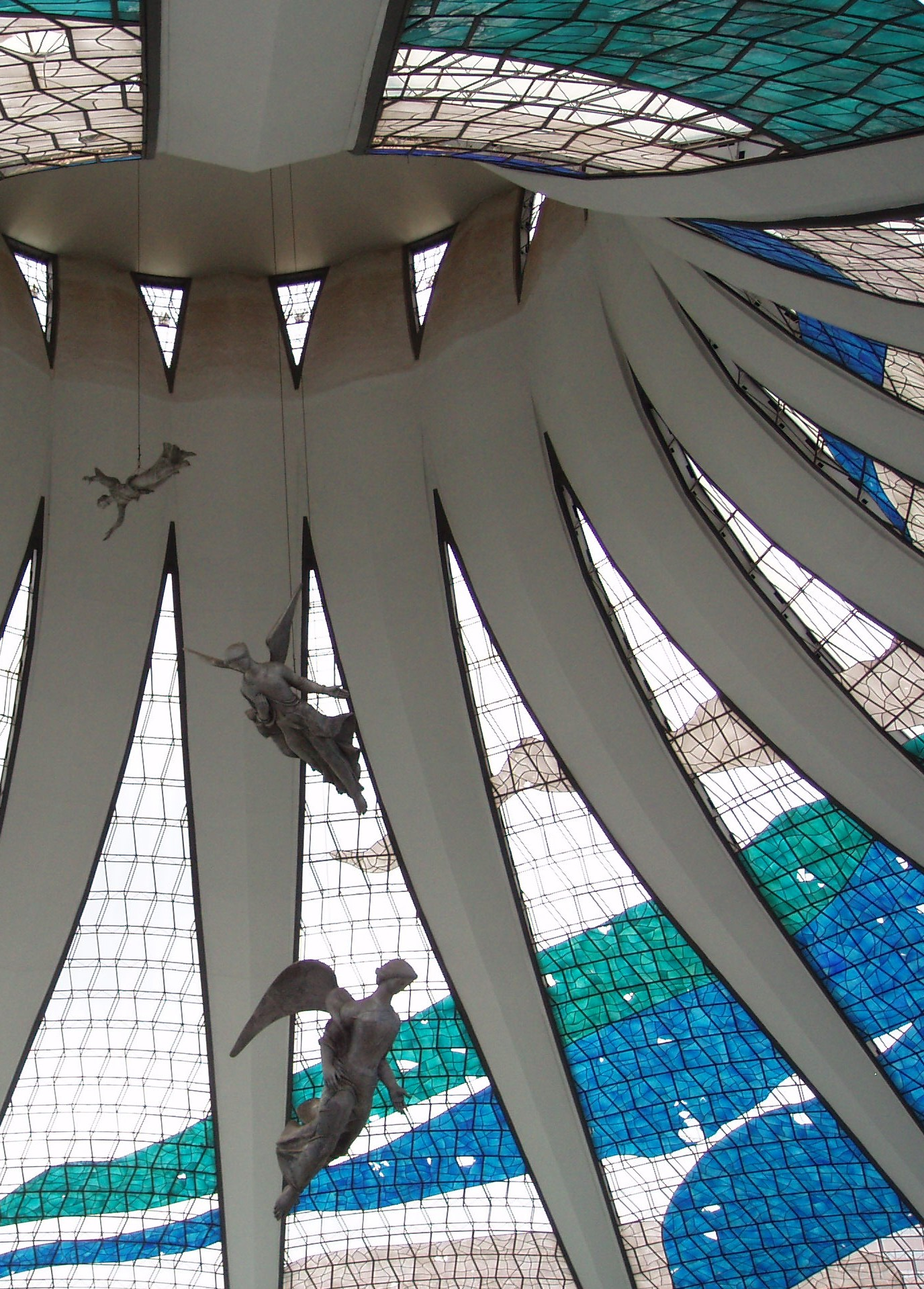
Interior of the Cathedral of Brasília, Brazil

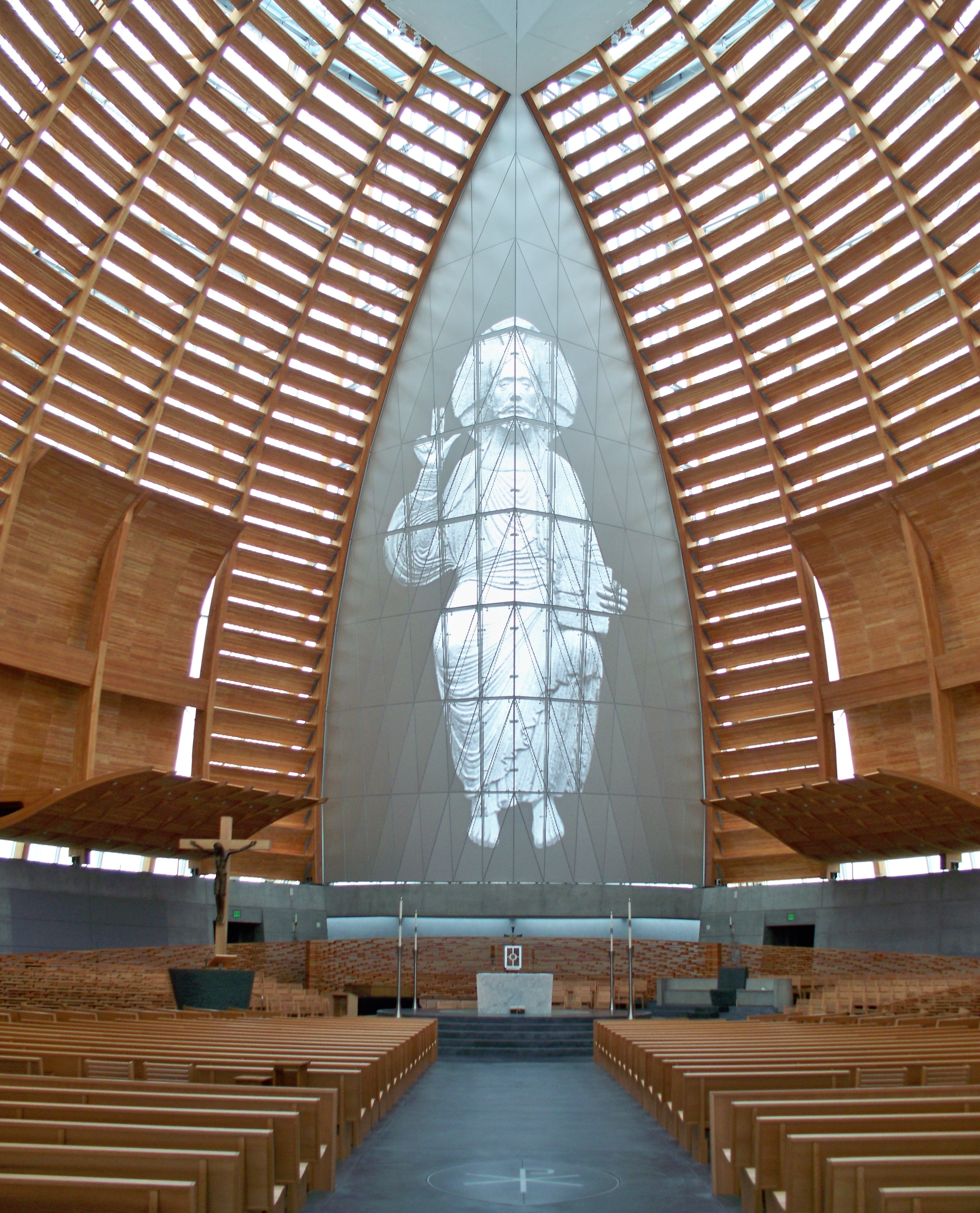
Interior of the Cathedral of Christ the Light, Oakland, California

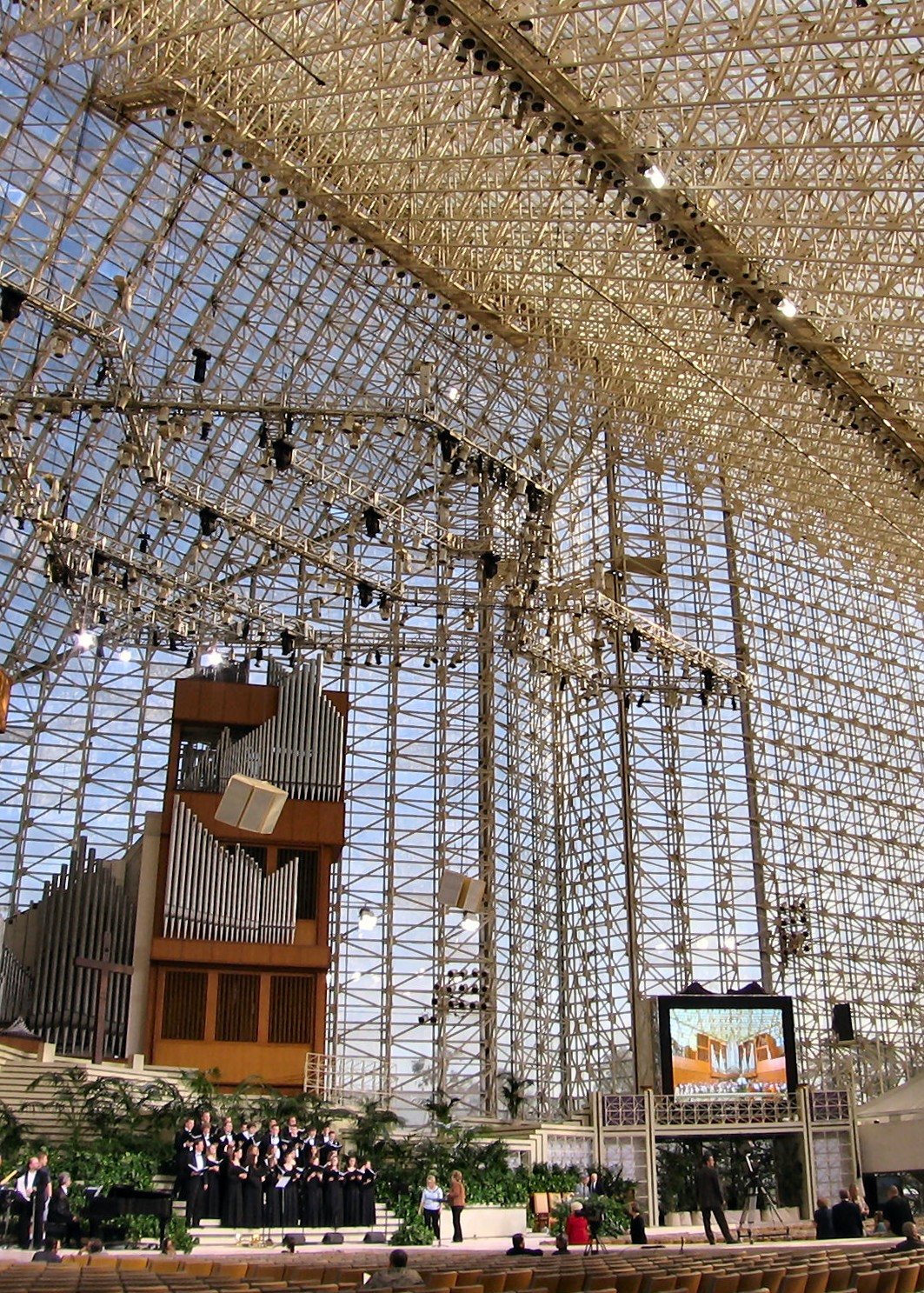
Interior of the Christ Cathedral in Garden Grove, California

=== Post Modern ===
As with other Postmodern movements, postmodern architecture formed in reaction to the ideals of modernism as a response to the perceived blandness, hostility, and Utopianism of the Modern movement. While rare in designs of Church architecture, there are nonetheless some notable examples as architects have begun to recover and renew historical styles and "cultural memory" of Christian architecture. Notable practitioners include Steven J. Schloeder, Duncan Stroik, and Thomas Gordon Smith.

The functional and formalized shapes and spaces of the modernist movement are replaced by unapologetically diverse aesthetics: styles collide, form is adopted for its own sake, and new ways of viewing familiar styles and space abound. Perhaps most obviously, architects rediscovered the expressive and symbolic value of architectural elements and forms that had evolved through centuries of building—often maintaining meaning in literature, poetry and art—but which had been abandoned by the modern movement.

Post Modern Churches

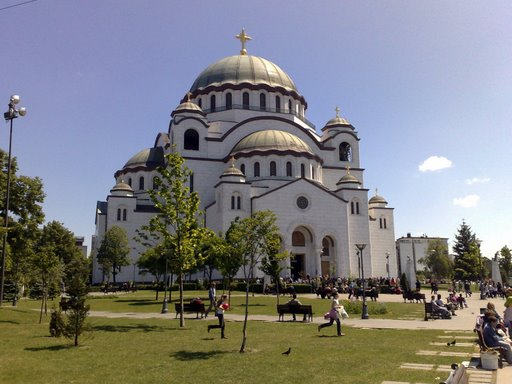
Cathedral of Saint Sava, Belgrade, Serbia is modelled on the ancient Byzantine Church of Hagia Sophia see above

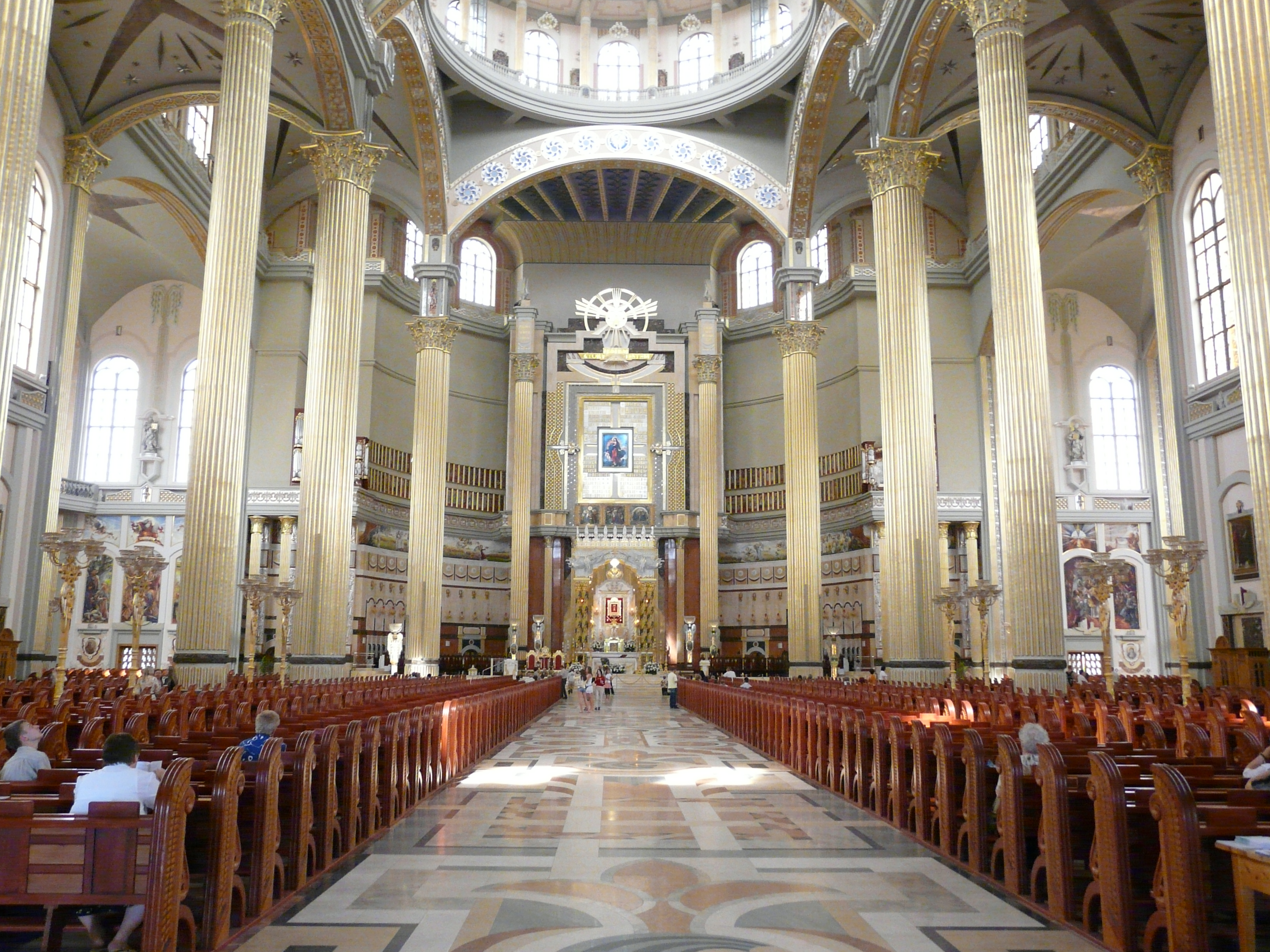
The interior of the Basilica of Our Lady of Licheń clearly draws from classical forms of Western European church architecture.

The Basilica of Our Lady of Peace in Yamoussoukro, Ivory Coast; built in 1989–1990.

== See also ==
- Sacred architecture
- Church architecture
- Medieval architecture
- List of regional characteristics of European cathedral architecture
- Architecture of the medieval cathedrals of England
- Lists of cathedrals
- The Reformation and its influence on church architecture

=== Architectural styles (chronological order) ===
- Early Christian art and architecture
- Byzantine architecture
- Eastern Orthodox church architecture
- Romanesque architecture
- Gothic architecture
- French Gothic architecture
- Renaissance architecture
- Baroque architecture
- Victorian architecture
- Polish Cathedral style architecture

=== Architectural features ===
- Architectural development of the eastern end of cathedrals in England and France
- Cathedral diagram
- Clerestory
- Rose window
- Triforium
- Vault

=== Decorative features ===
- Ablaq
- Gargoyle
- Grotesque
- Labours of the Months
- Stained glass
  - British and Irish stained glass (1811–1918)
- Tree of Jesse
