= List of regional characteristics of European cathedral architecture =

The regional characteristics of European cathedrals are those characteristic architectural features which define the local cathedrals (and other great churches) of any given region, and often transcend period and style.

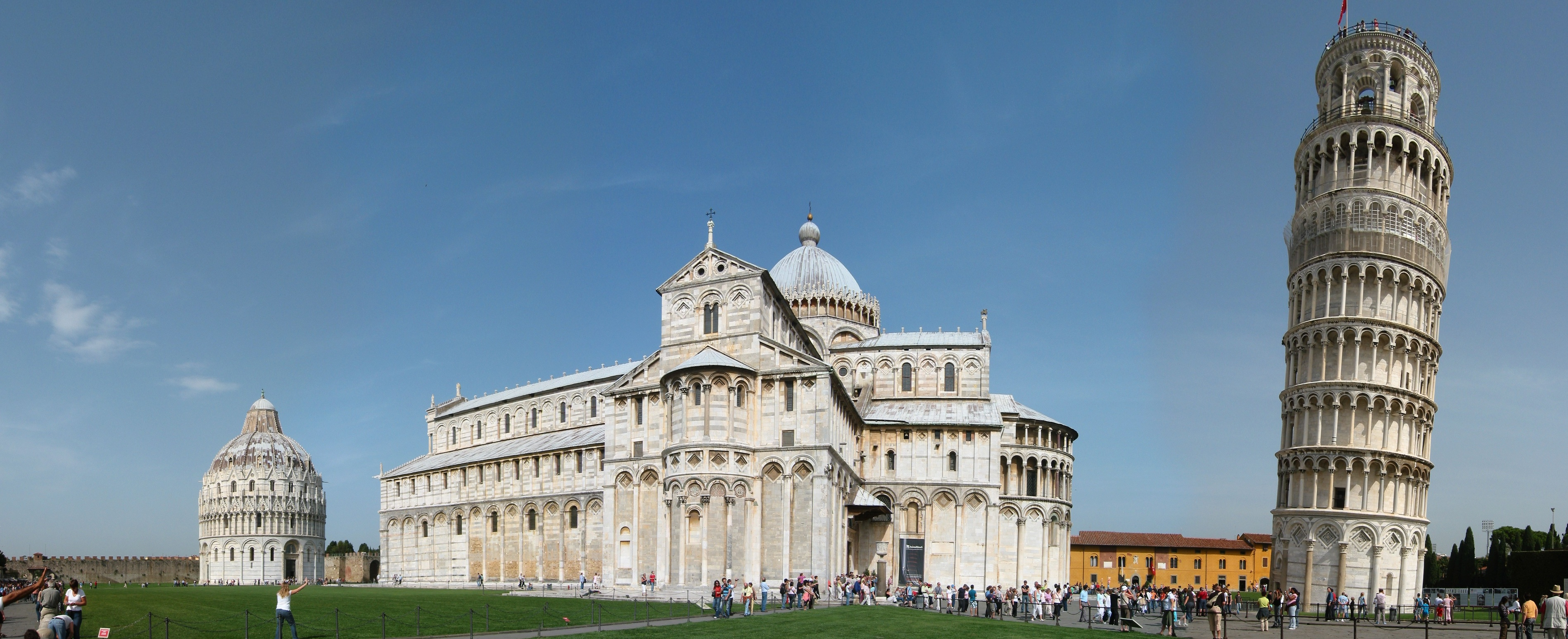
The Cathedral of Pisa, with free-standing baptistry and famous "leaning tower", a complex of buildings of stylistic unity

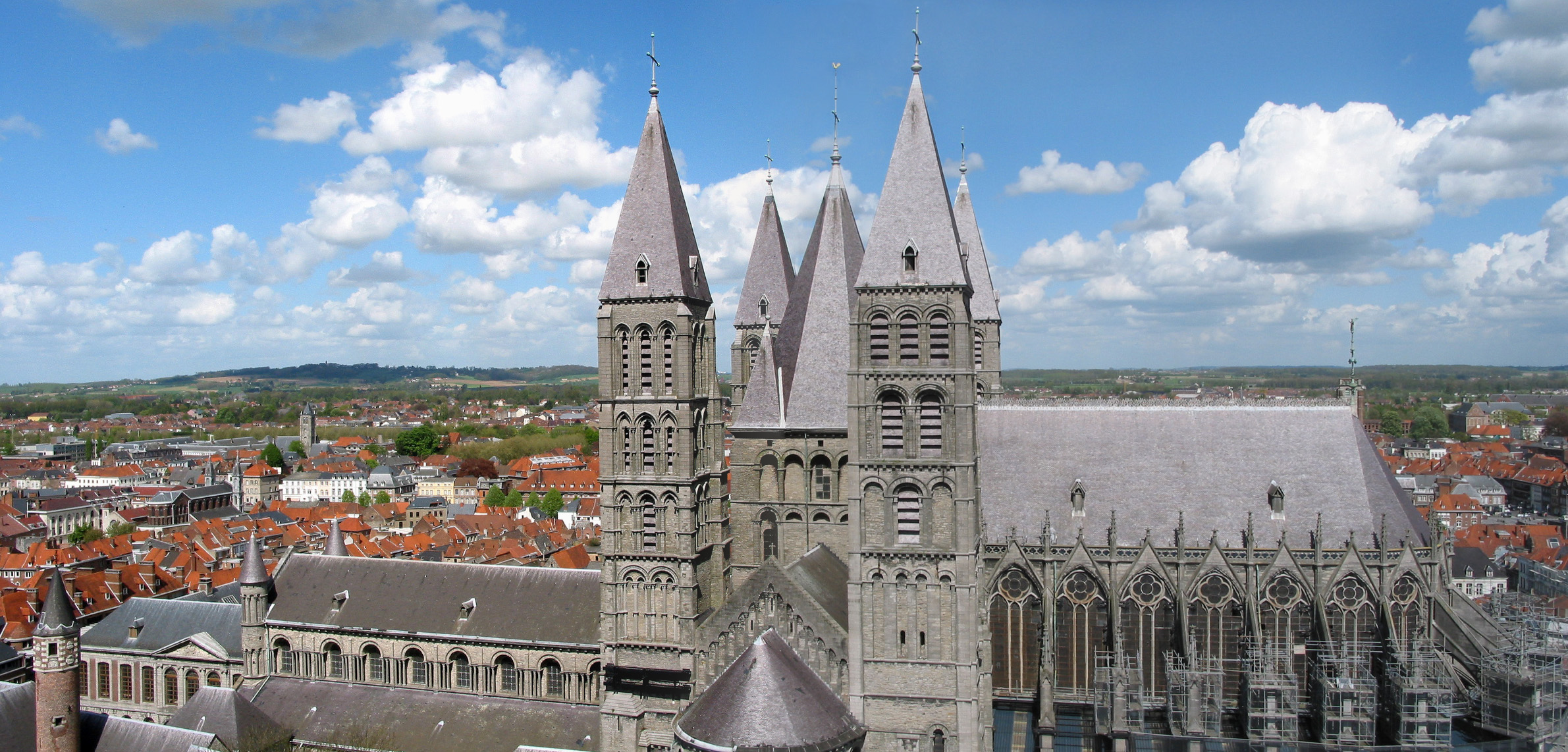
Our Lady of Tournai Cathedral, Belgium, a single building of enormous stylistic diversity

== History ==
The earliest large churches date from the Roman Empire. As Christianity and the construction of churches and cathedral spread throughout the world, their manner of building was dependent upon local materials and local techniques. Different styles of architecture developed and their fashion spread, carried by the establishment of monastic orders, by the posting of bishops from one region to another and by the travelling of master stonemasons who served as architects. The styles of the great church buildings are successively known as Early Christian, Byzantine, Romanesque, Gothic, Renaissance, Baroque, various Revival styles of the late 18th to early 20th centuries and Modern. Overlaid on each of the academic styles are the regional characteristics. Some of these characteristics are so typical of a particular country or region that they appear, regardless of style, in the architecture of cathedrals designed many centuries apart.

== Regional examples ==
Note- The lists which follow aim to give, in point form, those characteristics of each selected example which typify the architecture of the region. This section does not aim to give a detailed description of each building.

Each list deals with plan, eastern end, crossing, emphasis, special features, sunlight and shadow, decoration, narrative features and things that make the building distinct from those of another region. For more detail, look up the particular building on List of Cathedrals. The method of comparison used here is based upon the descriptions of regional "architectural character" by Banister Fletcher.

=== Italy ===
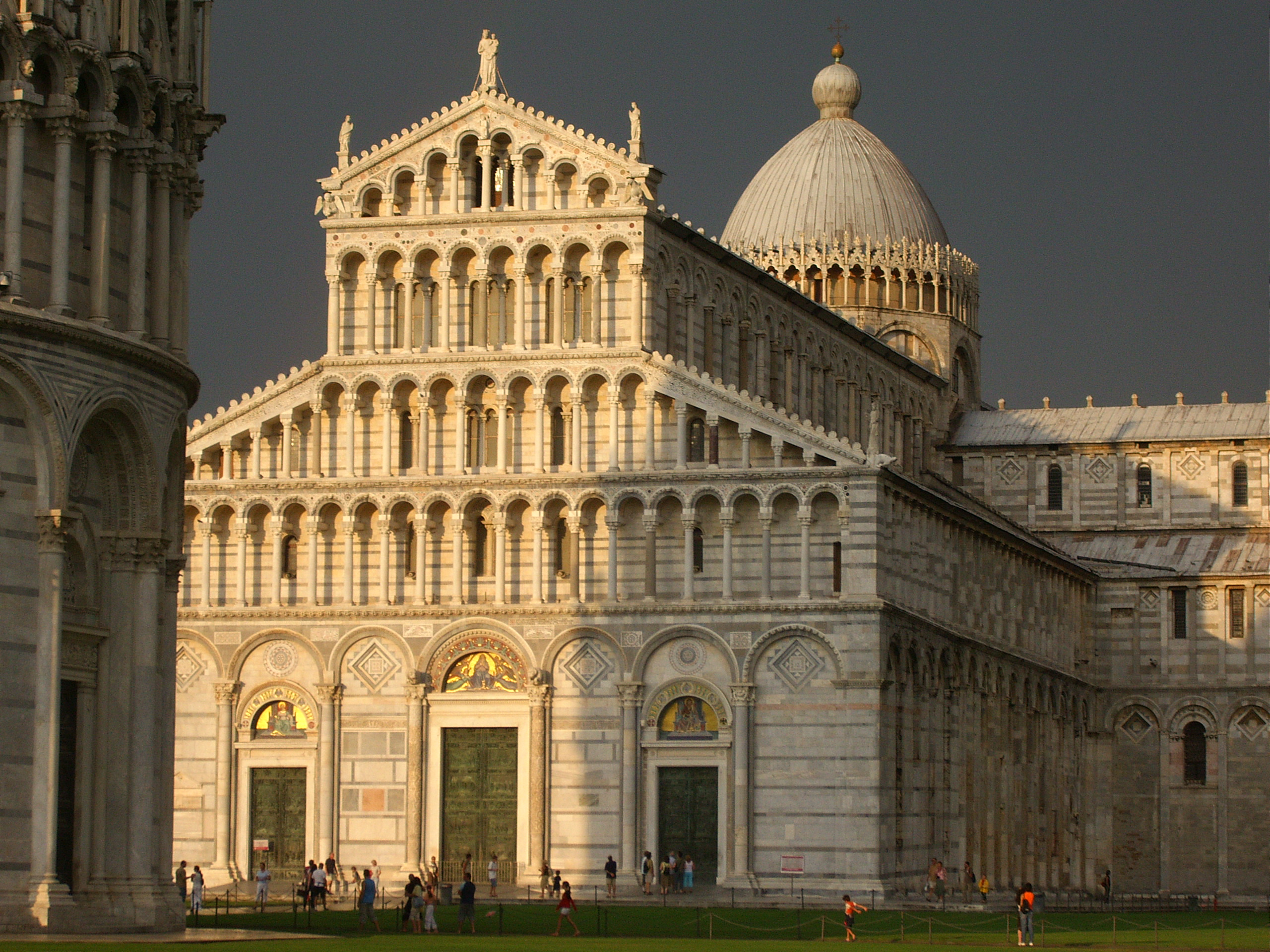
The arcaded façade of Pisa Cathedral at sunset. See also the picture of the cathedral complex in the introduction

The cathedral or Duomo of Pisa with the complex of buildings that surrounds it in the Piazza dei Miracoli is the epitome of the Italian Cathedral. It is a building of the Romanesque Style, built mostly between 1063 and 1092 with some Gothic additions. Many of the features that characterise this building as Italian continued to be employed right through to the Baroque period. Sir Banister Fletcher describes this cathedral as "one of the finest of the Romanesque period" with "marked individuality" and "beauty and delicacy of ornamental features".

Note- This list presents a brief analysis of regional characteristics found in the particular building. For a complete description follow the link to the web page.

- The plan is a simple well-defined Latin cross.
- The eastern end of the building and the terminals of the transept have semi-circular apses with no surrounding ambulatory.
- The crossing is surmounted by a dome which, in this instance, is unusual in being oval, thus prefiguring the flexible use of architectural form of the Baroque period.
- The various parts of the building are well defined by projection and delineation. The ornamentation serves to define separate architectural units, rather than to merge them, e.g. the vertical stages are separated by horizontal courses, the horizontal bays are defined externally by attached shafts, internally the arcade is separated from the clerestorey level by a cornice.
- Various functions of the cathedral are isolated in separate buildings. The famous free-standing Campanile demonstrates why this was often the case in Italy- the soft soil of river valleys causes subsidence, while Italy also has a greater frequency of seismic movement than other parts of Western Europe. The Baptistry is an enormous free-standing building with a central space surrounded by a two-storey gallery.
- The arcade is the dominant decorative feature, running in bands around the cathedral, the baptistry and, most notably, the campanile where it defines each of the eight levels. In the bright sunlight and high sun angle of southern Europe, the effect is to cast horizontal definition across the surface of the building.
- Architectural details draw upon the Roman art, with capitals of a Corinthian type.
- Polychrome decoration in stripes of white marble alternating with green, grey or red gives a richness to the surface of the building.
- The media used for figurative story-telling includes mosaic, sculpture in defined rectangular panels such as the sides of an octagonal marble pulpit and the panels of the bronze doors.

Section references: Banister Fletcher, Larousse.

Examples of Cathedrals in Italy:

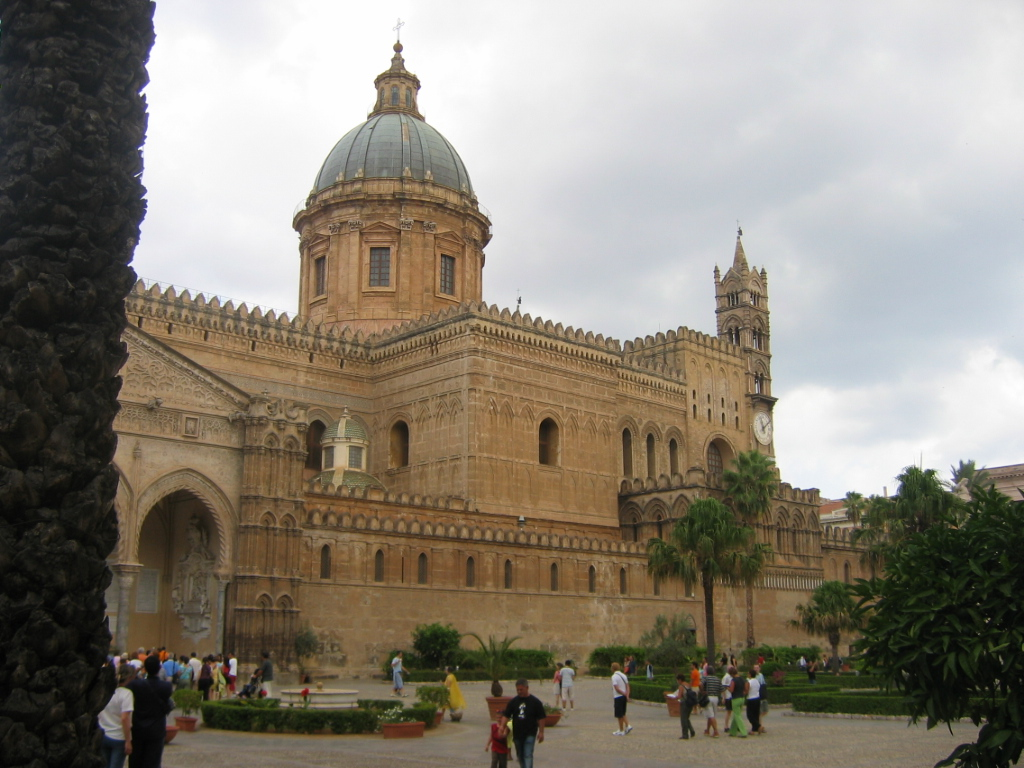
Cathedral of Palermo

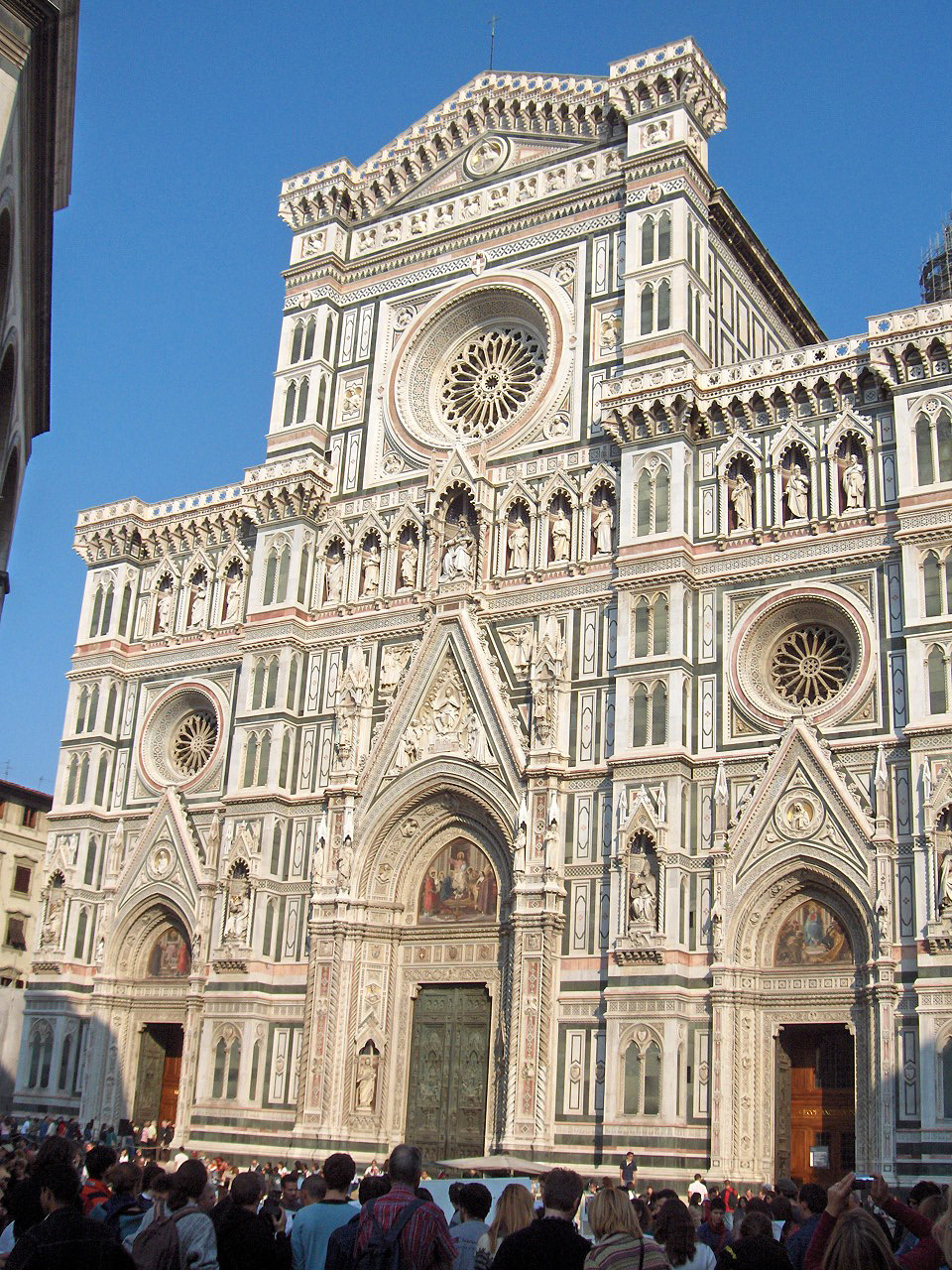
Cathedral of Florence

Modena Cathedral façade

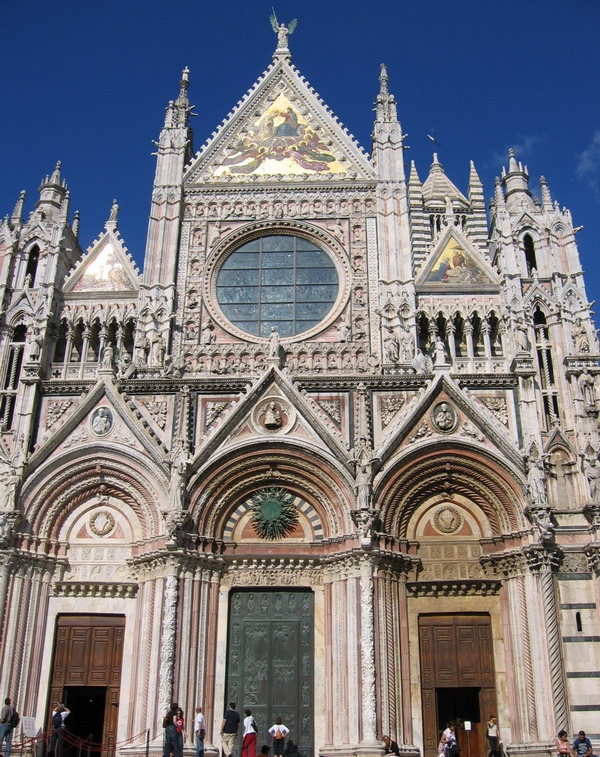
Duomo di Siena

=== France ===
Amiens Cathedral is a Gothic building, 1220–1288, which typifies the cathedrals of northern France. Wim Swaan writes "In the nave of Amiens, Gothic structure and the treatment of the classic, three-stage interior elevation established at Chartres, achieved perfection."

Note- This list presents a brief analysis of regional characteristics found in the particular building. For a complete description follow the link to the web page.

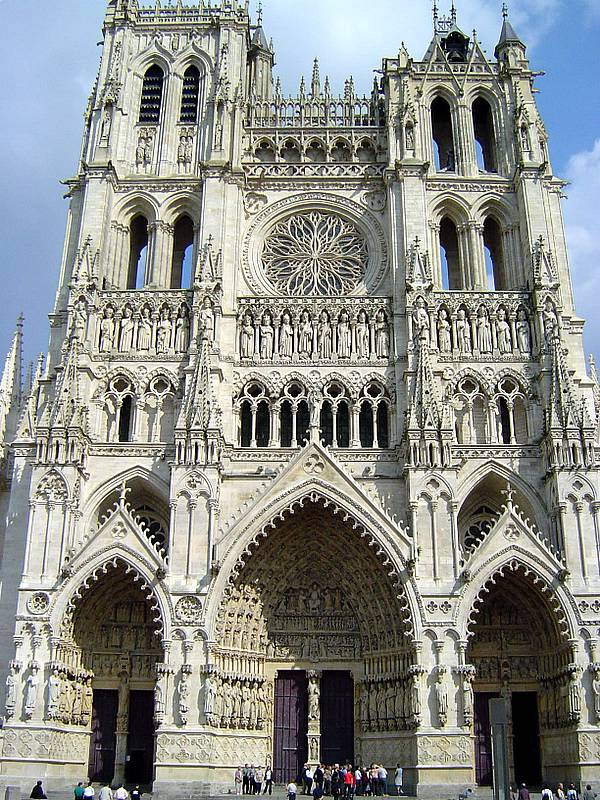
Amiens Cathedral showing the three portals and rose window

- The plan is cruciform but the transepts do not project beyond the aisles, giving the church a compact appearance.
- The eastern end of the building has an apse surrounded by a cluster of lower radiating chapels called a chevet.
- There is an emphasis on verticality. The vault is supported by flying buttresses.
- The crossing is surmounted by a delicate open-work spire called a flèche.
- The various parts of the building are united by architectural features and decoration which emphasise a verticality of design, e.g. there are shafts attached to the columns which commence at the floor and carry upwards through all the vertical stages (arcade, triforium and clerestory) to become the ribs of the vault.
- The West Front is a very significant feature having three enormous decorated portals, two towers and a rose window. There is an arbitrary quality about the proportions and the towers are of different heights.
- The façade is divided by vertical buttresses and horizontal courses into a grid of decoration which causes the shadow to fall both vertically and horizontally.
- The dominant decorative feature is the lace-like stonework which screens the front, decorates the parapets and fills the windows with tracery. The flying buttresses and their pinnacles form a structural lacework which surrounds the exterior.
- The media used for story-telling are the stained-glass windows and the architectural statuary that surrounds the doors and fills the stone screens of the façade.

Section references: Banister Fletcher, Larousse, Swaan.

Examples of Cathedrals in France:

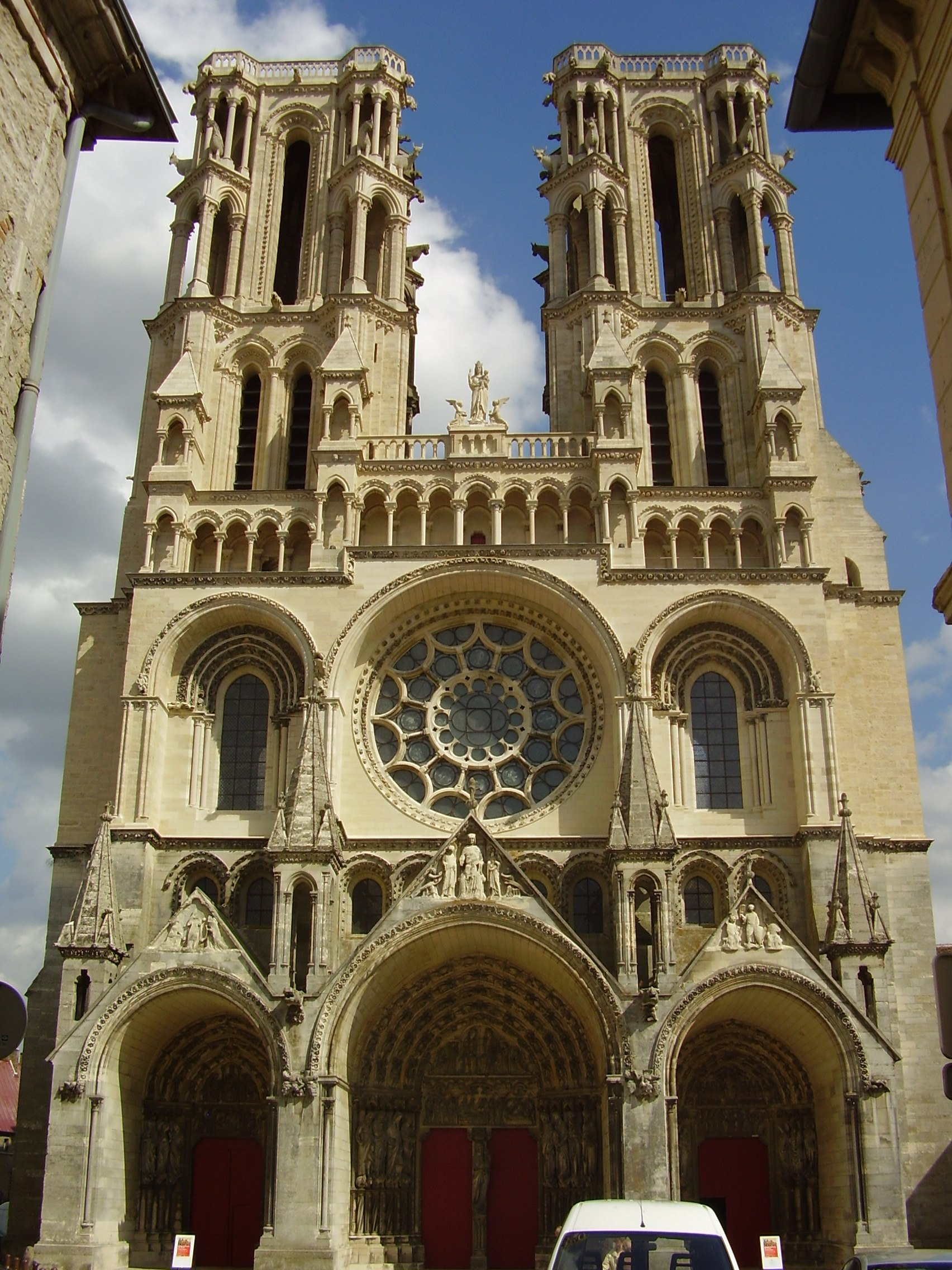
Laon Cathedral (Early Gothic)

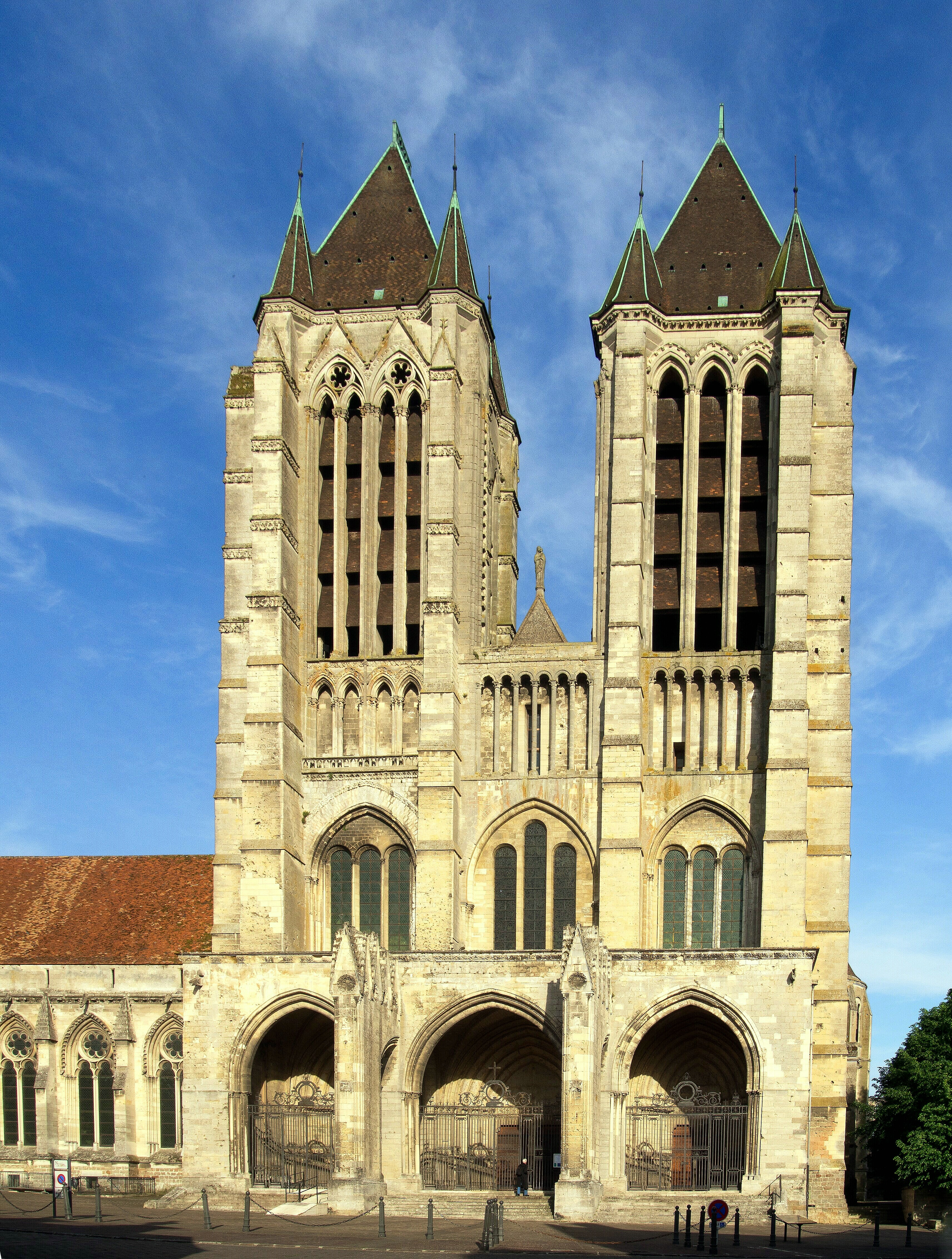
Noyon Cathedral (Romanesque, Early Gothic)

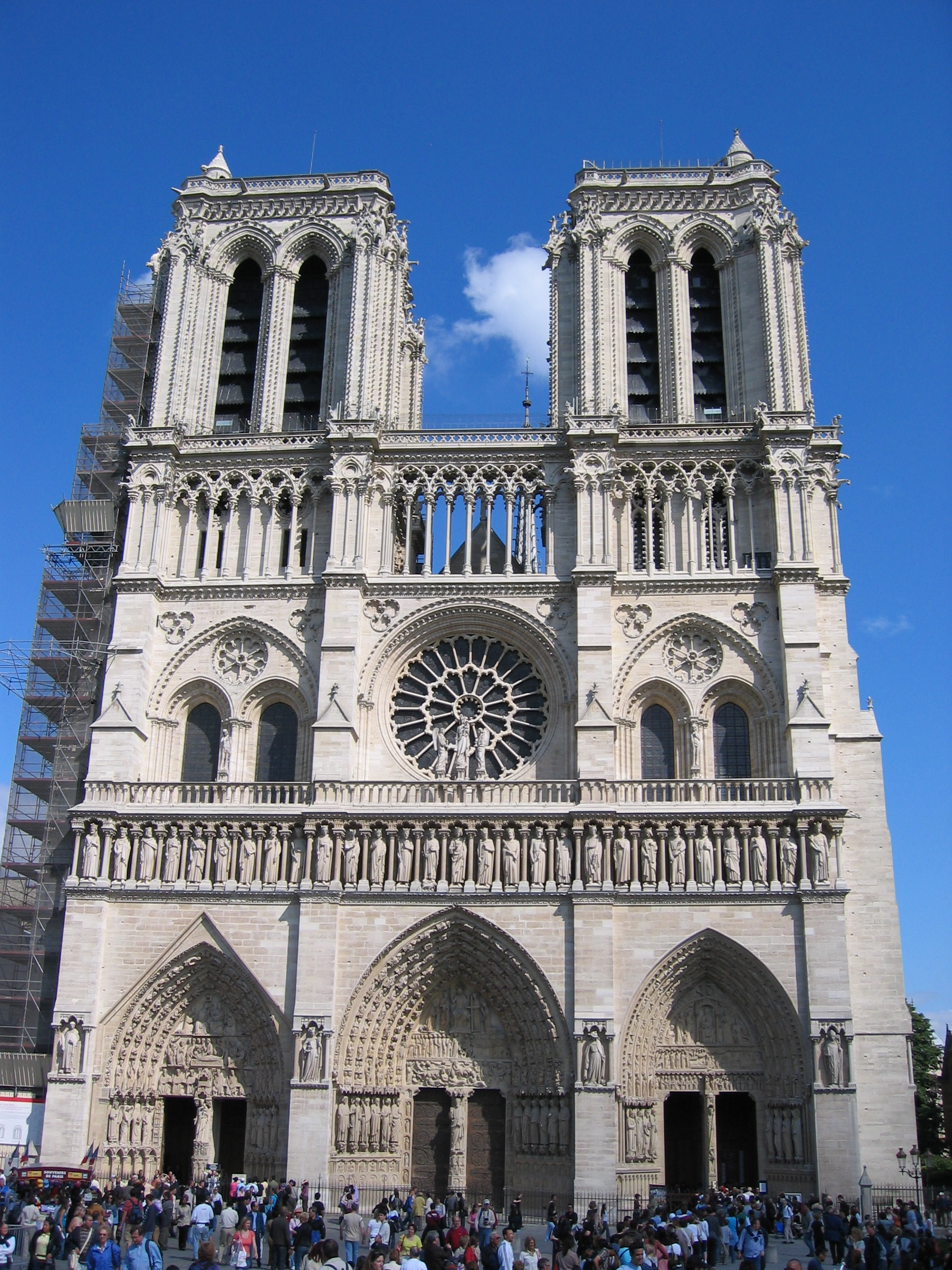
Notre-Dame de Paris
(Early Gothic, High Gothic
and Rayonnant)

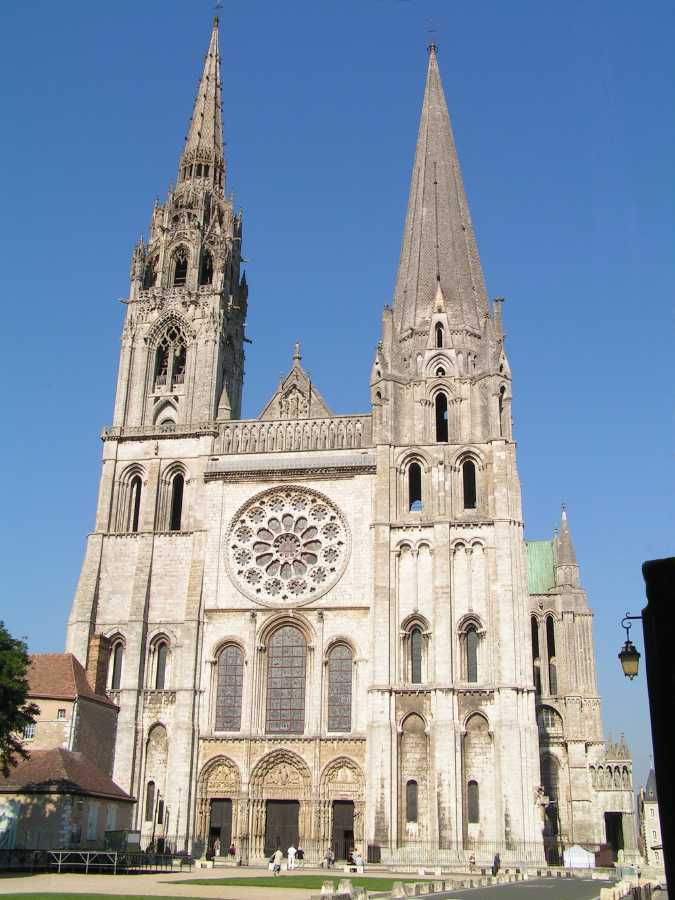
Chartres Cathedral
(west front: Early Gothic, body: High Gothic)

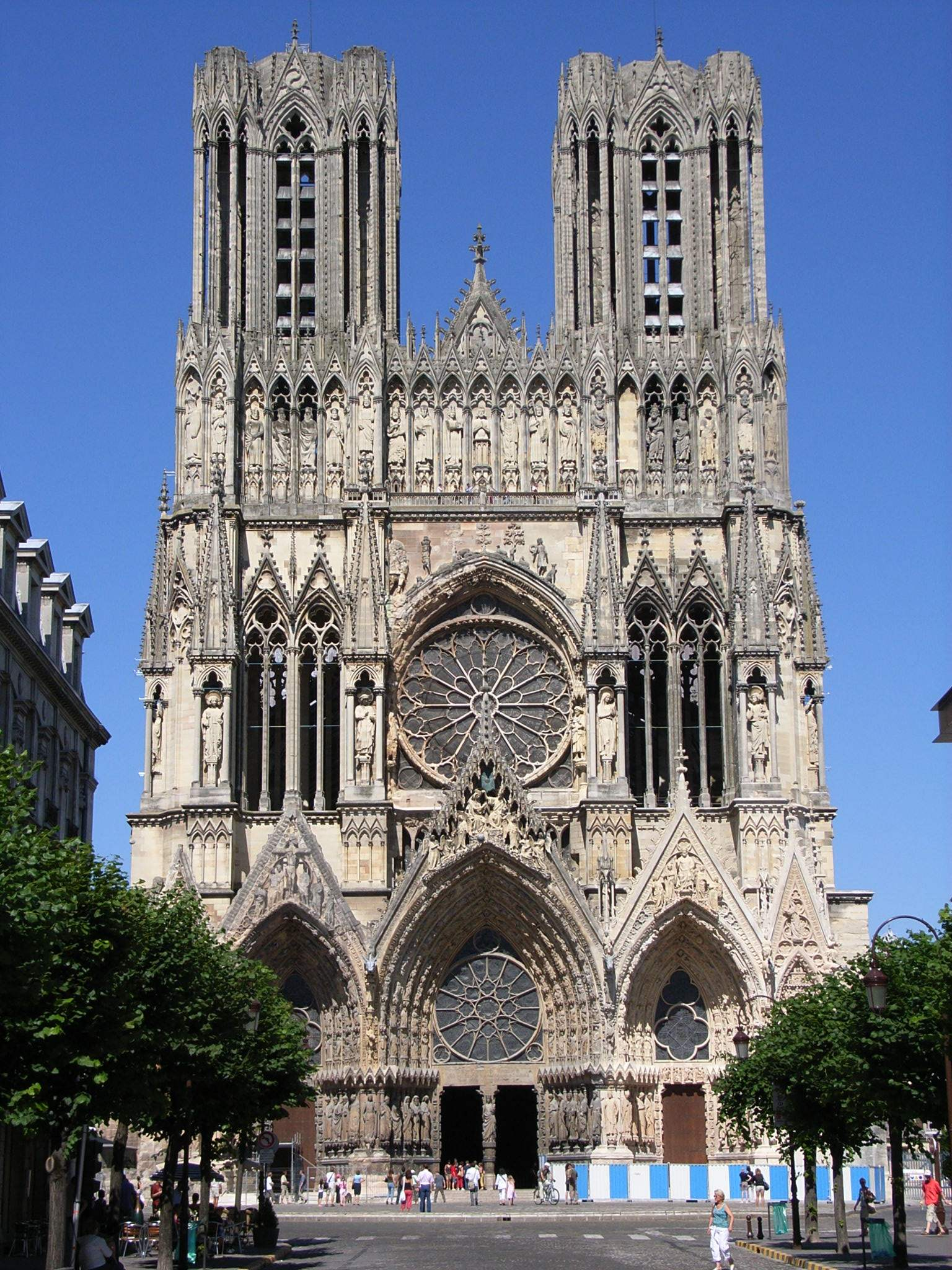
Reims Cathedral (High Gothic)

=== England ===
Lincoln Cathedral is typically English in both style and diversity having been commenced in 1074 and not reaching its final state until the 1540s. Alec Clifton-Taylor described it as: "Probably, all things considered, the finest of English Cathedrals".

Note- This list presents a brief analysis of regional characteristics found in the particular building. For a complete description follow the link to the web page.

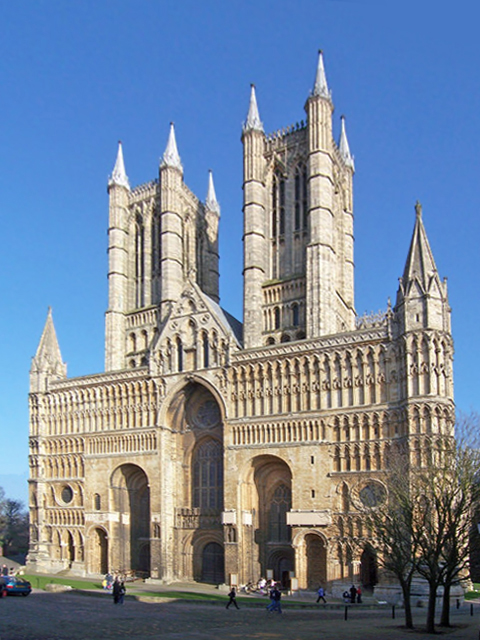
Lincoln Cathedral showing Norman portals, Gothic screen and towers in two stages

- The plan is a double cross with a large boldly projecting transept and a secondary transept with apsidal chapels towards the eastern end. It has a separate cloister and a decagonal chapter house with enormous flying buttresses.
- The eastern end is square and is filled by an enormous Gothic window with Geometric tracery.
- Internally, there is an emphasis upon length and horizontality. The vertical divisions of arcade, triforium and clerestorey are defined by strong horizontal courses. There is a very heavy ridge-rib which runs the length of the Gothic vaulting, carrying the eye along the nave.
- The crossing of the large transept is surmounted by a 270 ft tower, which for three hundred years supported a spire.
- The West Front has a sense of disharmonious grandeur, its gable and two tall towers rising in two building stages, Norman and Gothic, behind a vast Gothic screen with niches for hundreds of statues, which terminates in two polygonal pinnacles, each large enough to make a sizable church tower. At the centre three enormous arches frame the windows and the Norman portal.
- The towers have a very strong vertical emphasis with massive polygonal buttress which cast vertical shadows in the slanting sun. The deeply recessed archways have the same effect, while the sculpture screen is opposingly horizontal.
- The dominant decorative features internally are the contrast of the dark marble mouldings and ribs against the pale masonry, the regular repetition of arcading and the multiplicity of rib vaults. The effect of regular repetition of simple forms is seen externally on the screen and in the arrangement of windows.
- The media used for story telling were the stained-glass windows and the carvings. Unfortunately, these were devastated during the Dissolution of the Monasteries.

Section references: Banister Fletcher, Larousse, Clifton-Taylor.

Examples of Cathedrals in the United Kingdom:

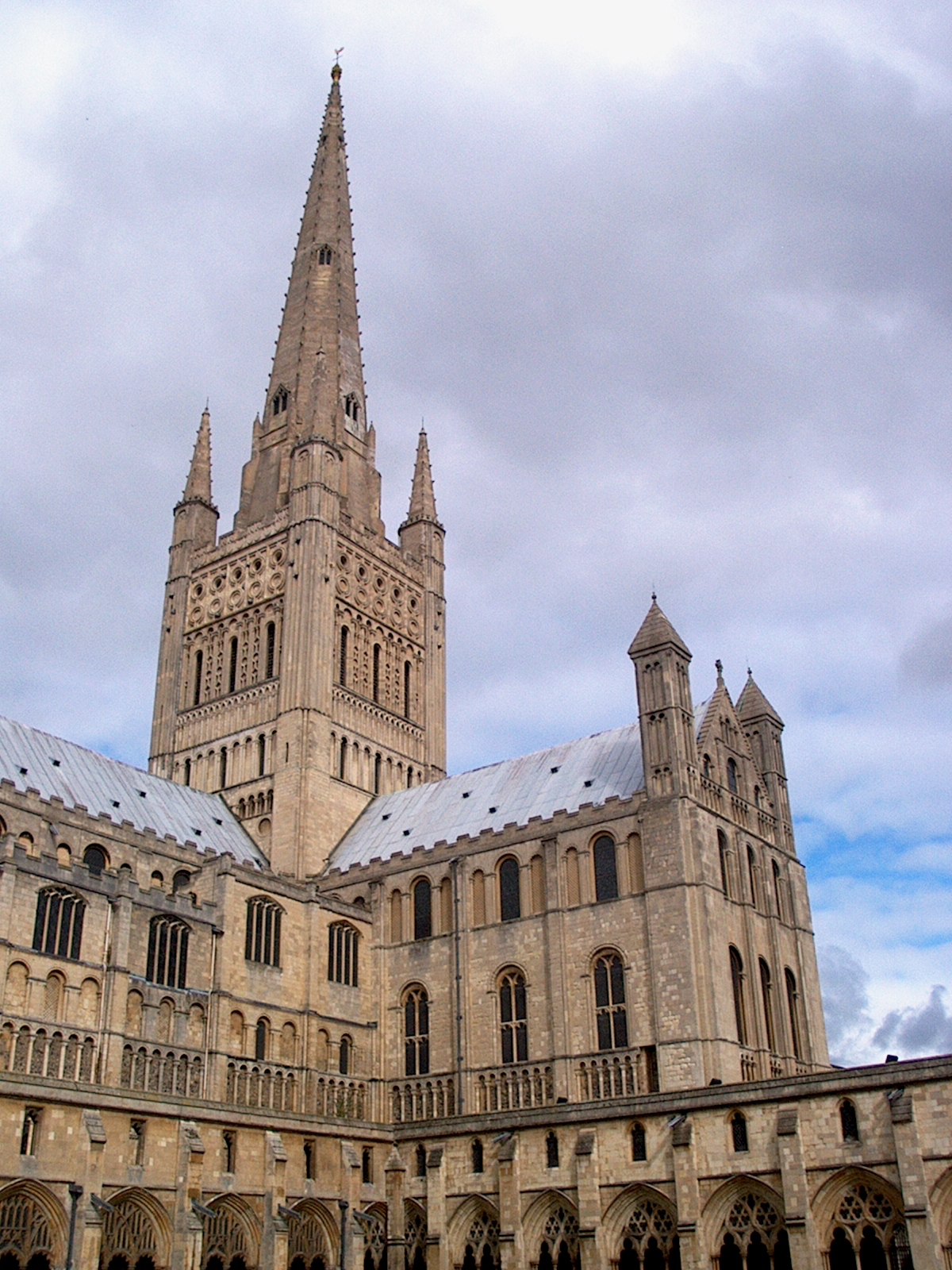
Norwich Cathedral

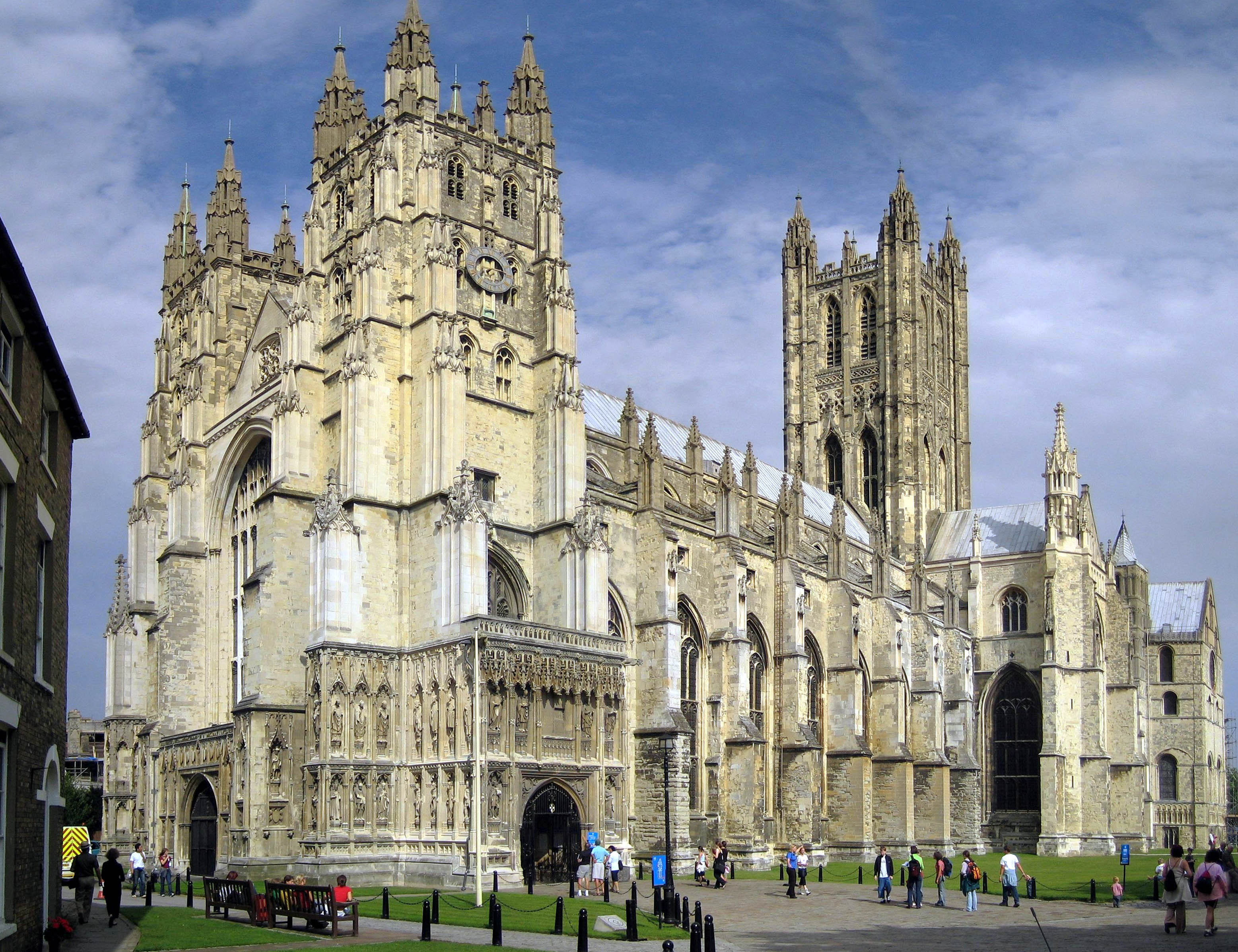
Canterbury Cathedral

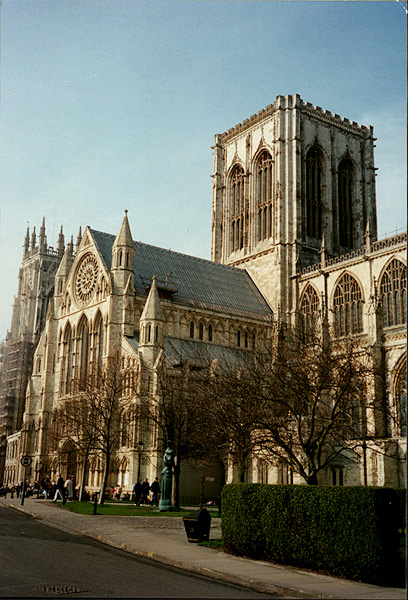
York Minster

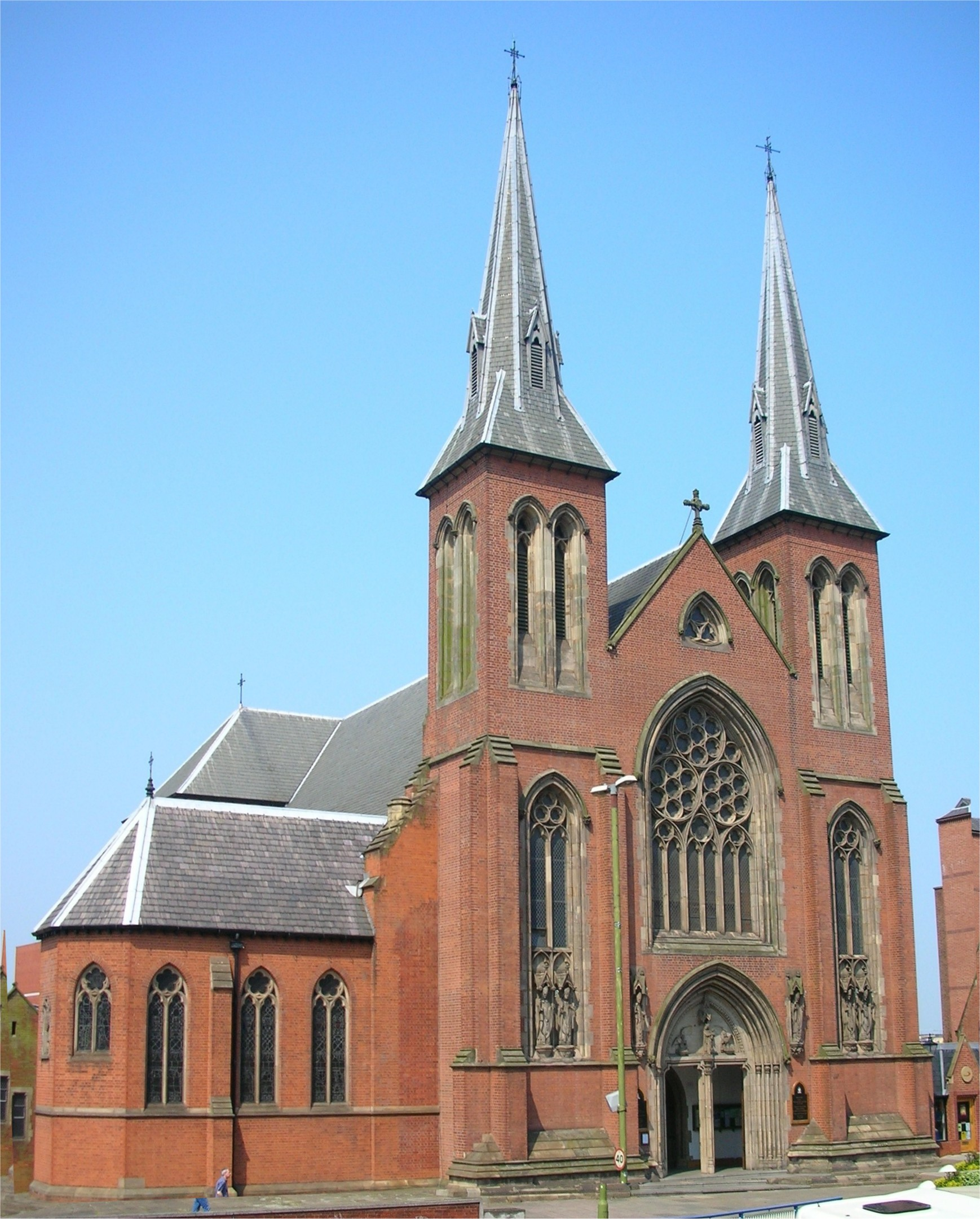
St Chad's Cathedral, Birmingham, 19th century

=== Germany ===
Worms Cathedral dates from 1110 to 1181. With the Cathedrals of Speyer and Mainz it represents a pinnacle of German Romanesque and has spatial qualities and what Banister Fletcher describes as "a picturesque character" which were later skillfully adapted in the many German Baroque churches.

Note- This list presents a brief analysis of regional characteristics found in the particular building. For a complete description follow the link to the web page.

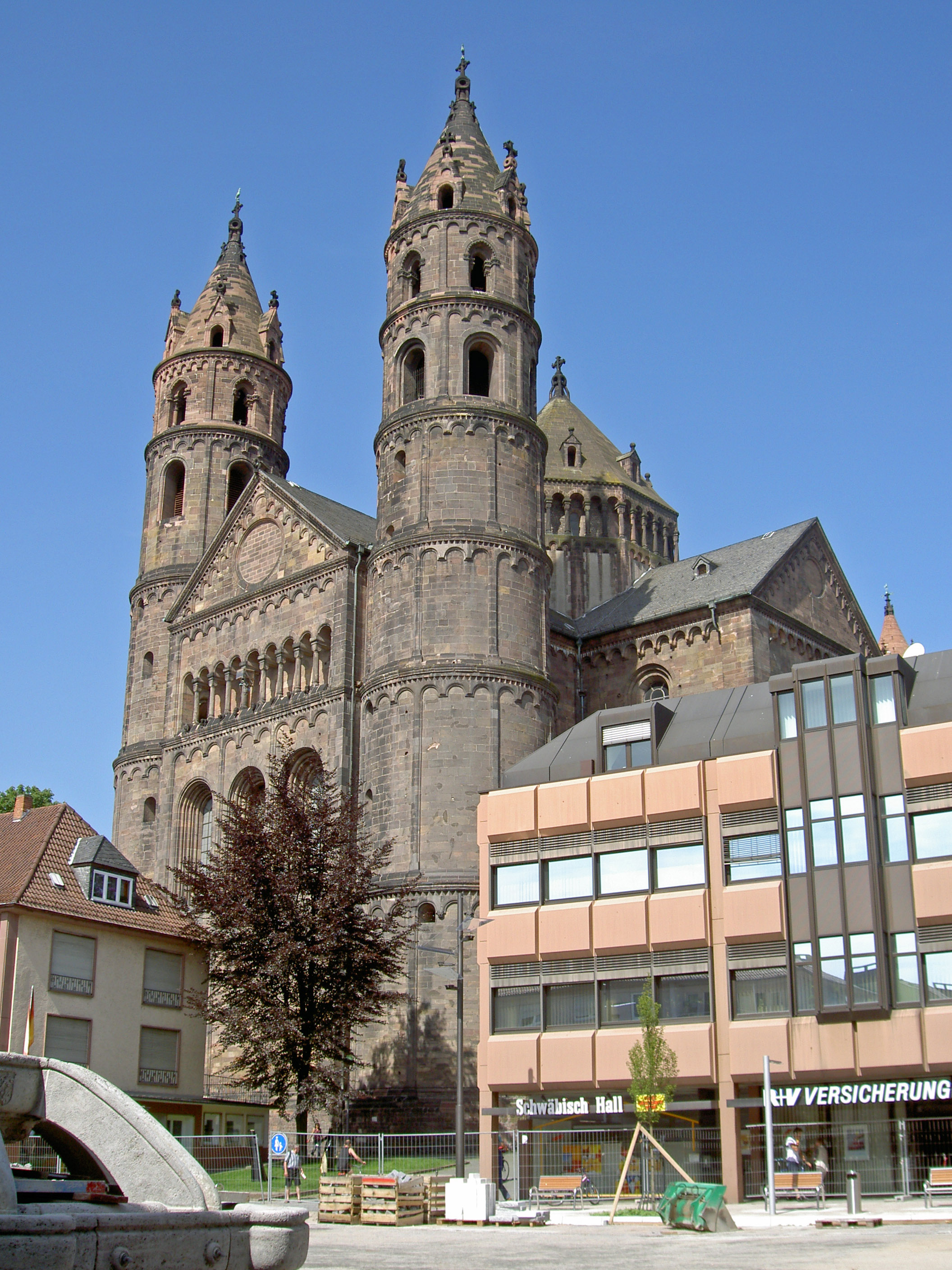
Worms Cathedral showing contrasting forms

- The plan is that of a modified Latin cross with slight projection of the transept. The entrance is through a southern porch.
- The eastern end has an apse, without ambulatory, and the western end has second lower apse, typical of German Romanesque and possibly derived from a free-standing baptistry.
- Above the crossing and at the western end are short octagonal towers. There are two taller towers flanking the building at either end. Each has a steeply pointed roof, either conical or octagonal.
- The various sections of the building are massive, clearly defined units, neatly assembled into a harmonious whole as if built from a child's set of building blocks. There is the sense that the building could be disassembled and rearranged. The massing together of the various parts emphasises the geometric three-dimensionality of each part.
- The entrance is an ornate Gothic porch, sandwiched between two chapels in a way that emphasises the integrity of each unit. There is no west front, no façade. The building requires looking at as a three-dimensional object.
- The sunlight falls over surfaces that are alternately broad and flat or circular. The details are minimal and the structure of the building is emphasised rather than its features.
- Externally, it is very simply decorated by flat pilasters and several courses of judiciously placed blind arcading in the manner of Pisa. Internally space and clarity take precedence over decoration, with the exception of the altarpiece.
- The media used for story-telling here is the riotous Baroque altarpiece which bursts out of the eastern apse with swathes and cherubs and statues.

Section references: Banister Fletcher, Larousse, Toman.

Examples of Cathedrals in Germany:

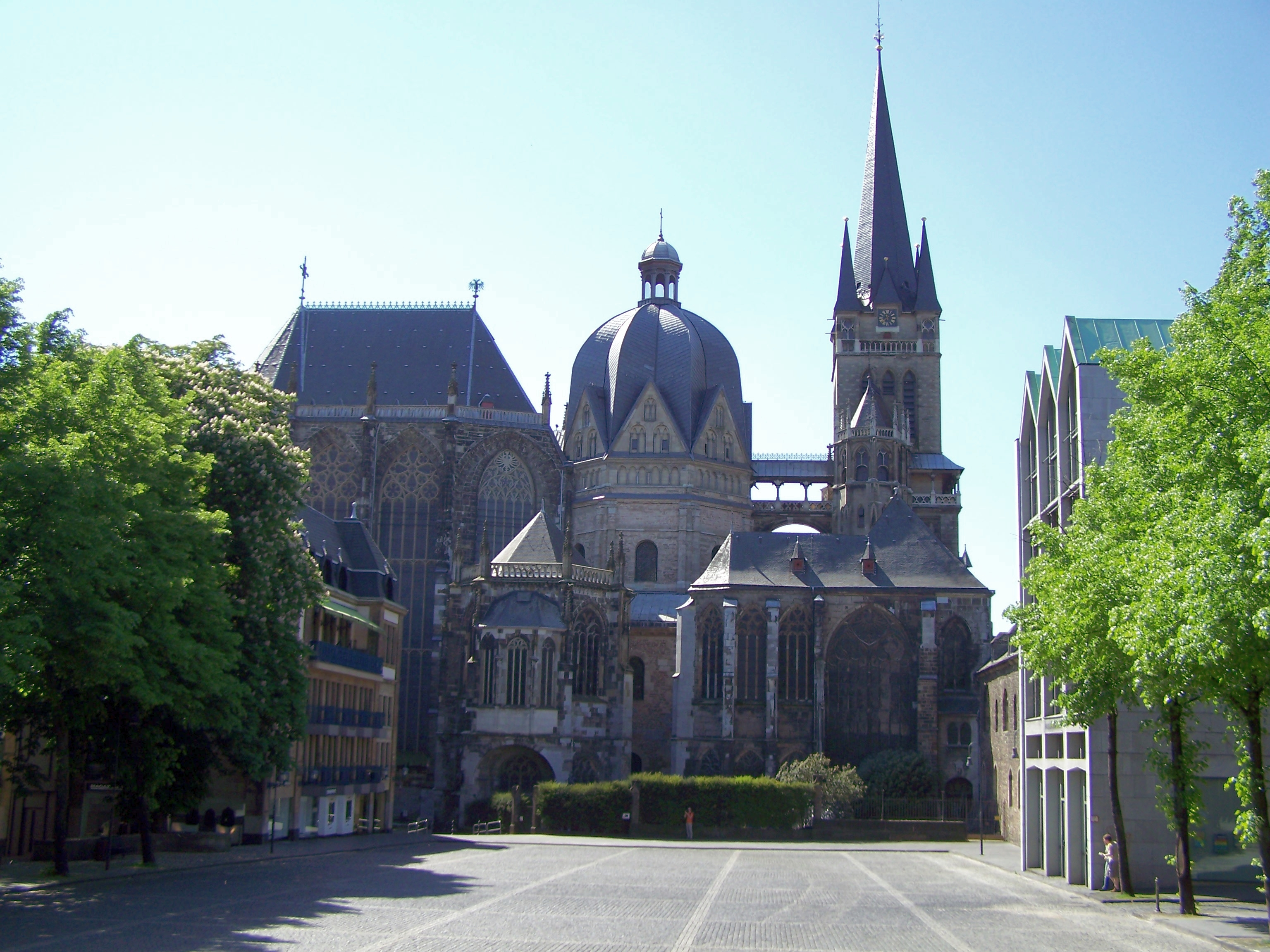
Aachen Cathedral

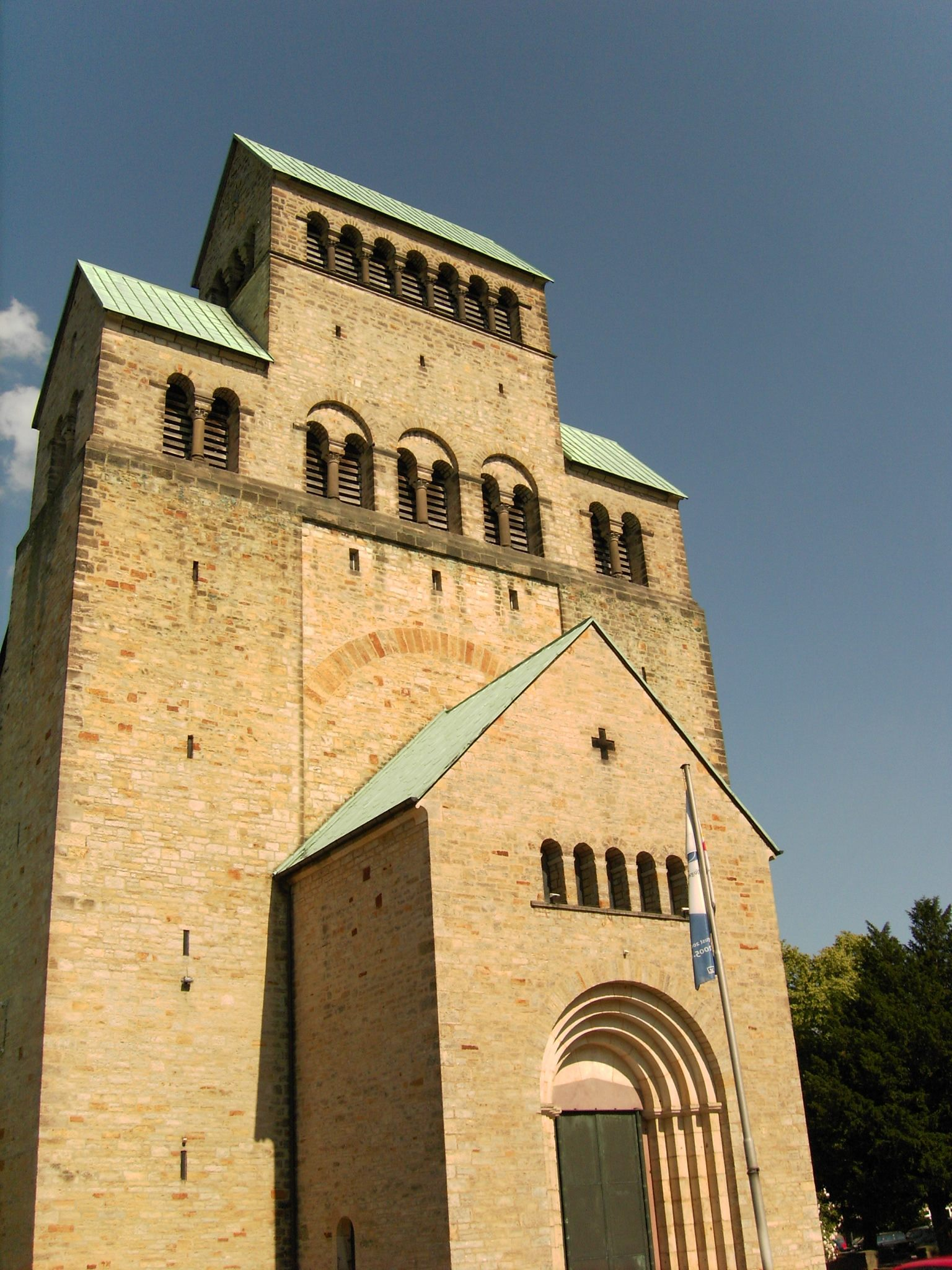
Hildesheim Cathedral

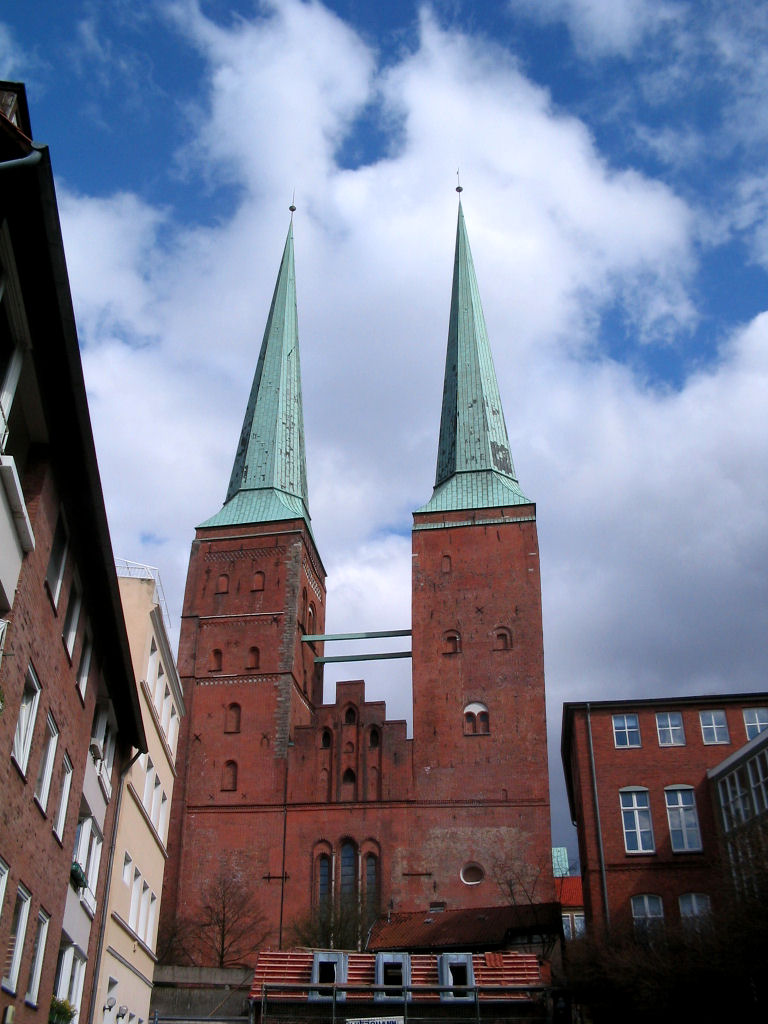
Lübeck Cathedral

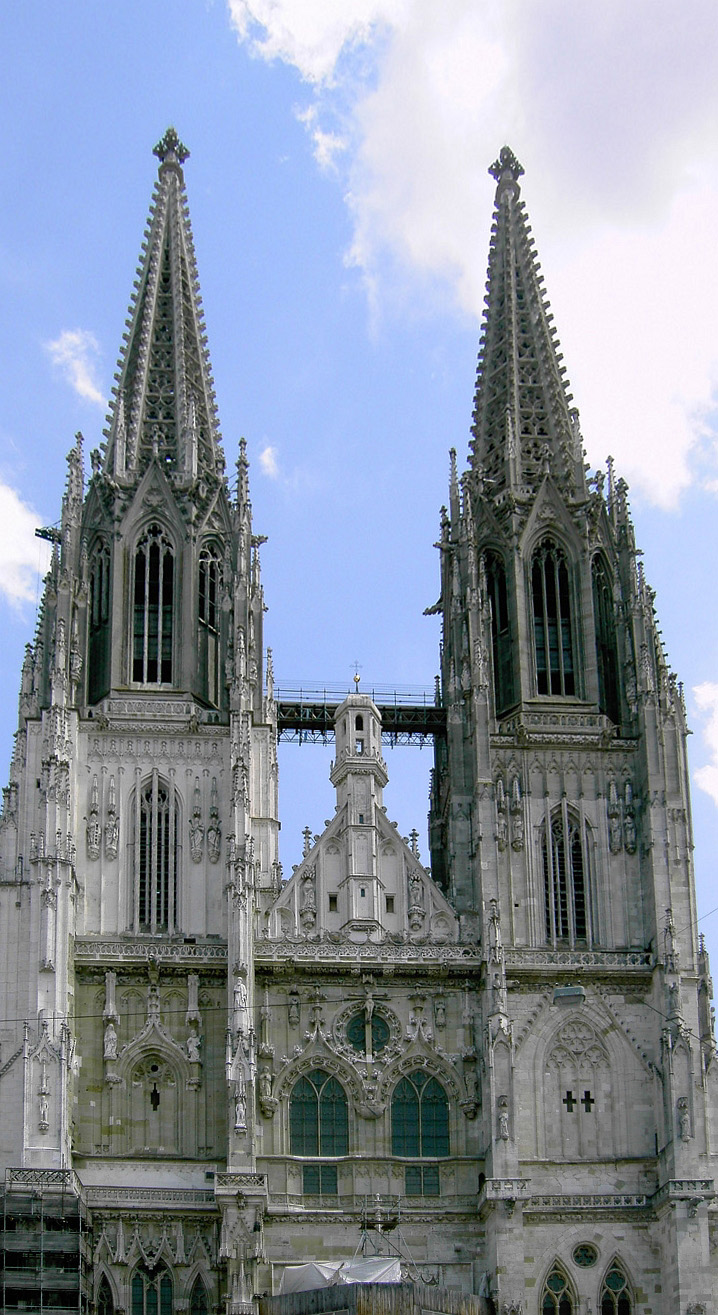
Regensburg Cathedral

=== Spain ===
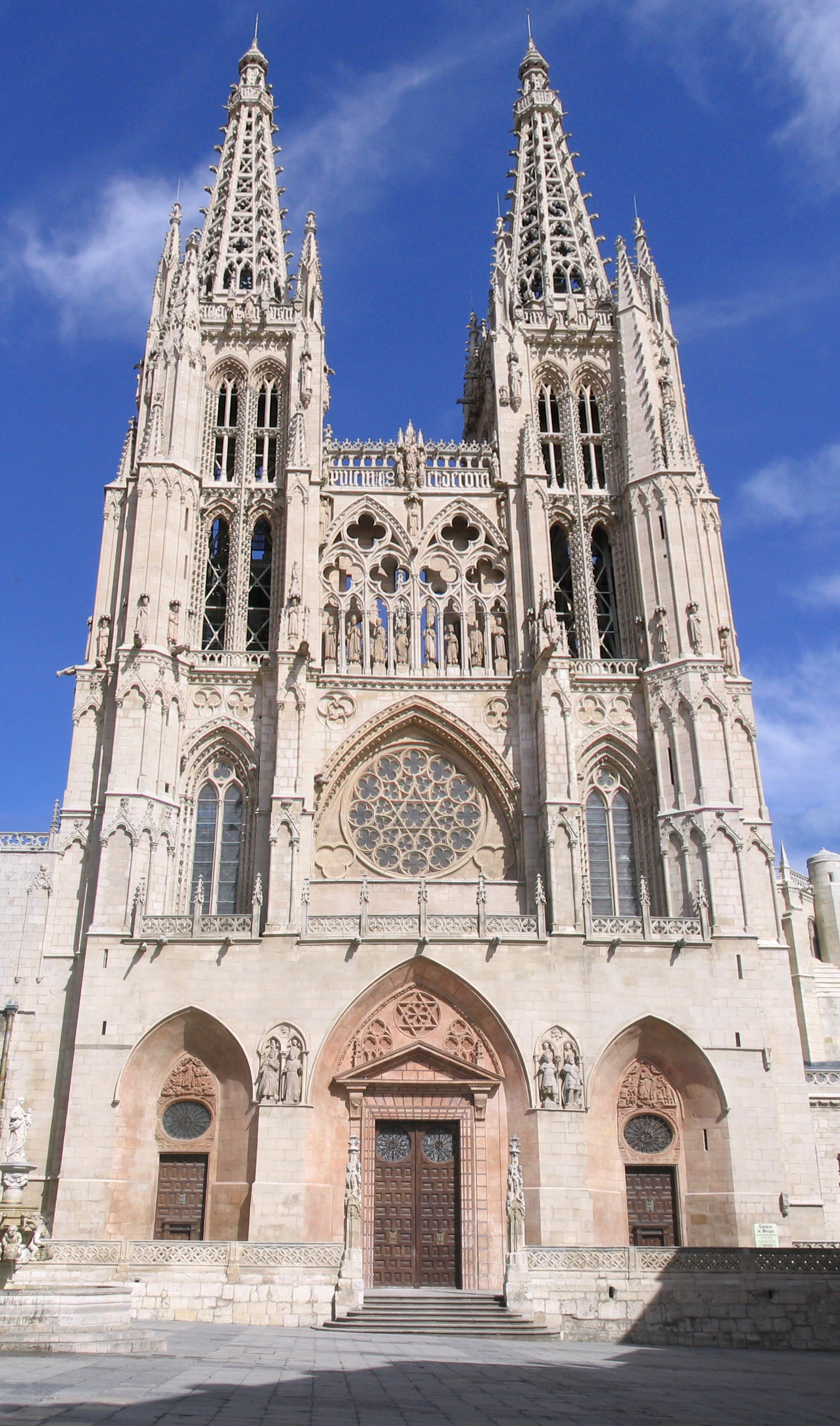
The west front of the Burgos Cathedral showing the contrast of plain and decorated surfaces.

Burgos Cathedral, commenced in 1221, represents many of the characteristics and is described by Banister Fletcher as "the most poetic of Spanish cathedrals." Note- This list presents a brief analysis of regional characteristics found in the particular building. For a complete description follow the link to the web page.

- Its ground plan is a Latin cross, with comparatively wide transept. But the plan is made complex and is visually disguised from the exterior by the accretion of numerous side chapels which cluster around it at different angles, and the abutment of the large Bishop's Palace to the south.
- The eastern end is apsidal with a chevet in the French manner. Several chapels surround the chevet, including the very large Capilla del Condestable.
- Internally, the building is marked by the breadth of the nave and the openness of its structure. Flat, plain, broad surfaces alternate with those that are richly and diversely decorated.
- The internal arrangement is typical of a Spanish cathedral in that the Quire is placed to the west of the crossing. Above the crossing is a richly decorated lantern tower.
- Externally, the various parts of the building cannot be seen together, except at a distance, from which the massive spires, lantern tower and pinnacles of the Capilla del Condestable combine to make a silhouette of great richness.
- The West Front is modeled on those of Northern France, but differs in the contrast of areas of plain and decorated surfaces. The twin towers of massive proportion, strongly defined buttresses and rich ornament carry spires of open lacework in the German style. There are two further façades, one at each transept end, each with a richly sculptured doorway.
- The decoration is of great diversity incorporating elements of French Gothic and German Gothic with earlier semi-circular Romanesque forms, Moorish motifs and in the arch of the central door, a Renaissance pediment. A remarkable feature is the placement of two very large screens which resemble traceried window openings, one of three bays at the south transept front and another of two between the western towers.
- A wealth of architectural and free-standing sculpture, paintings and stained-glass serve to inform the story of the faith.

Section references: Banister Fletcher, Larousse.

Examples of cathedral architecture in Spain:

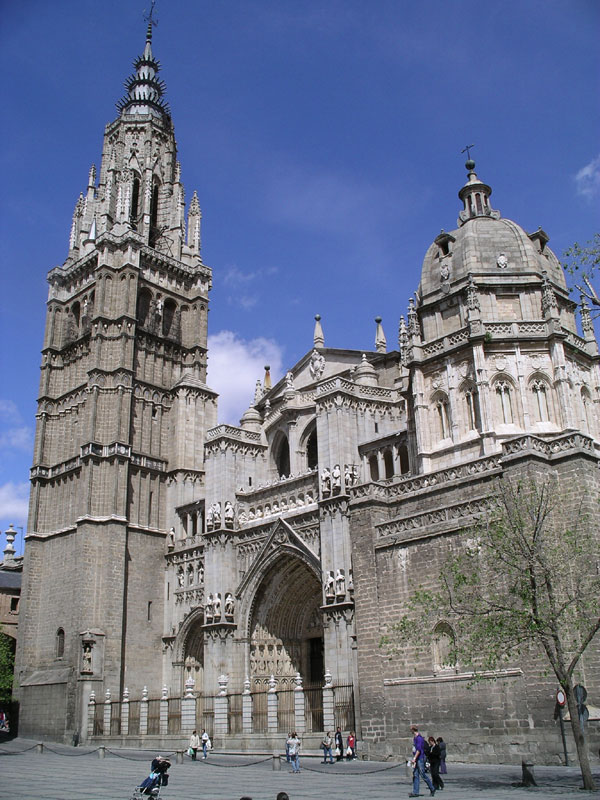
Cathedral of Toledo

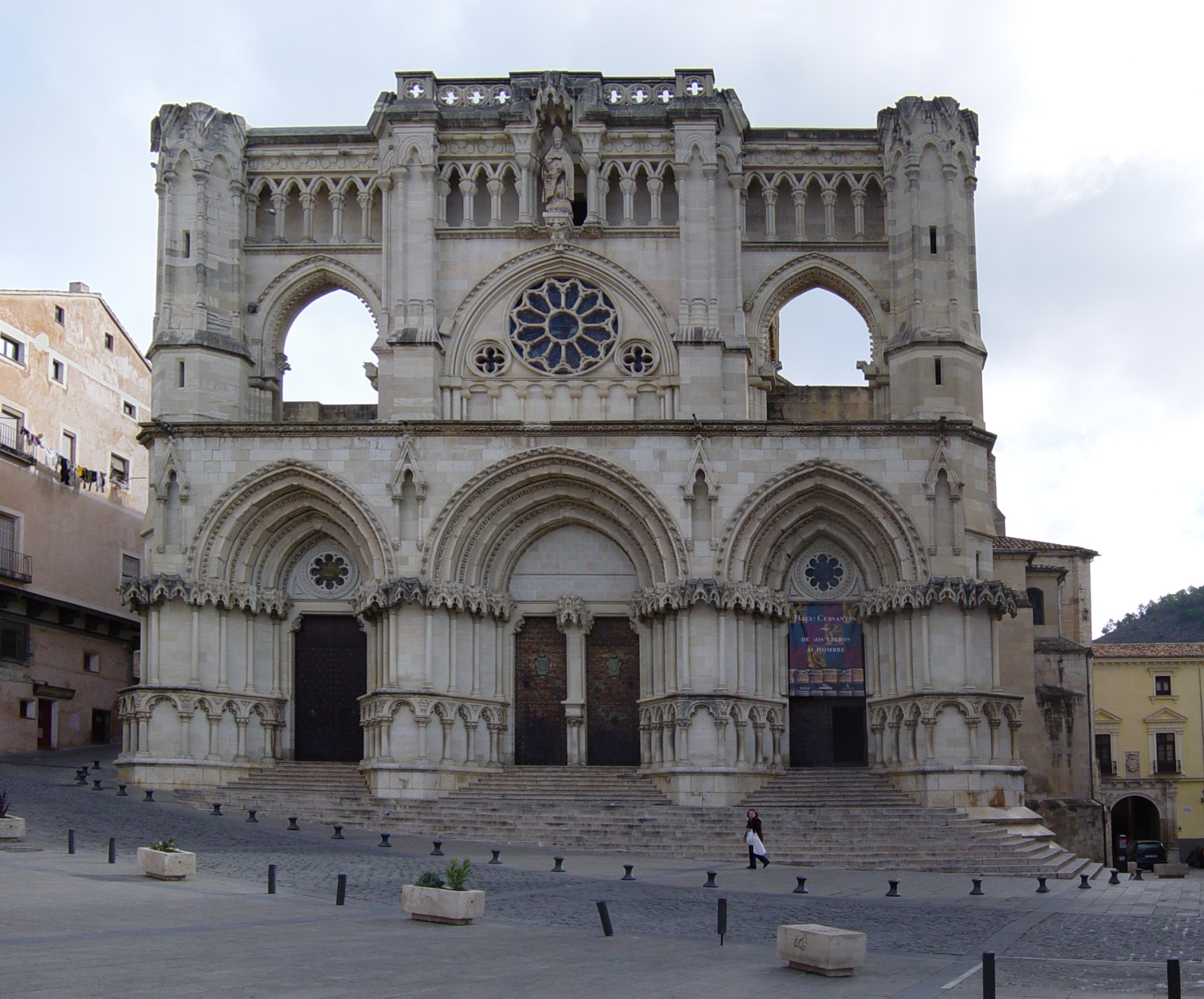
Cathedral of Cuenca

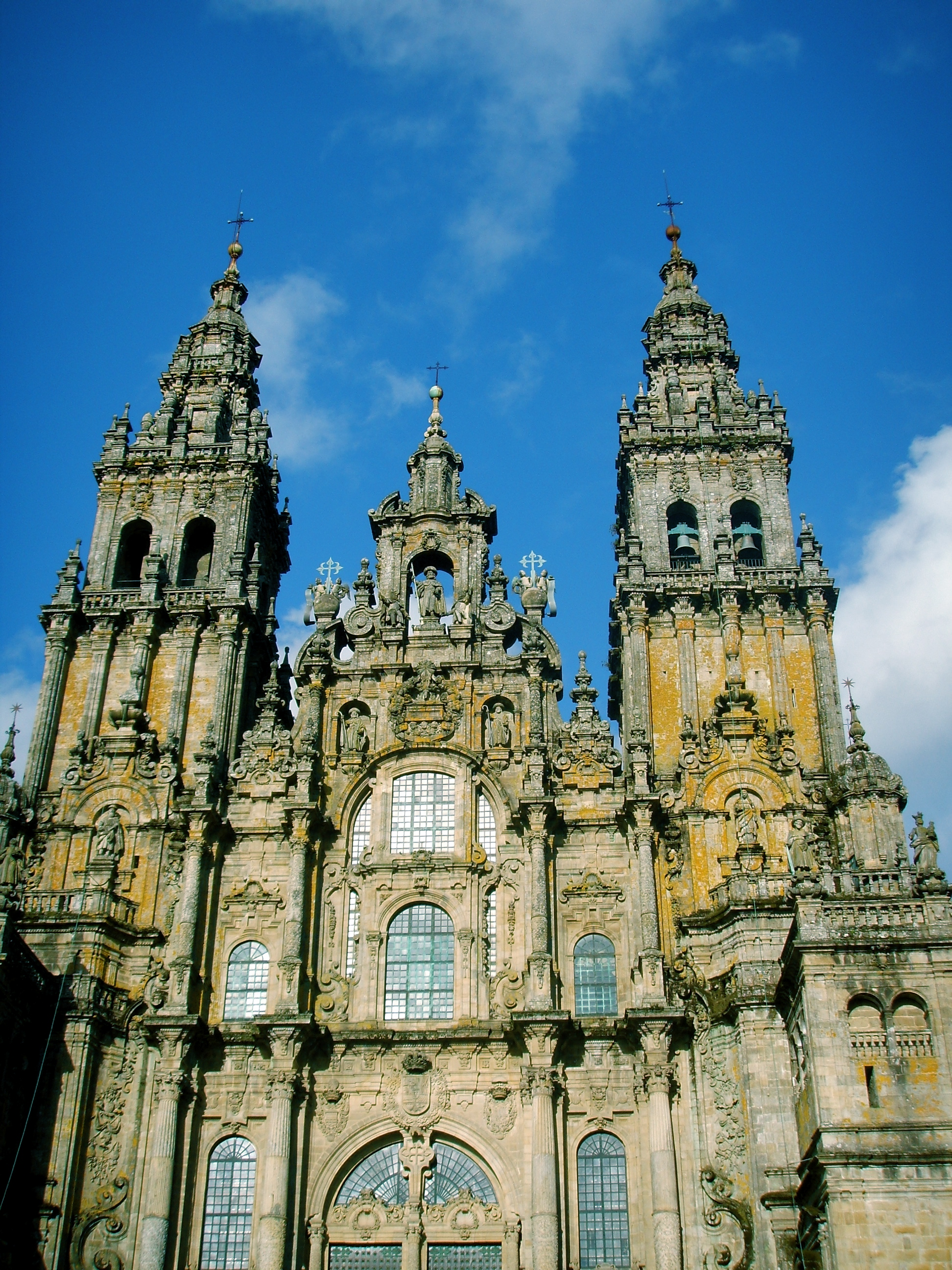
Cathedral of Santiago de Compostela

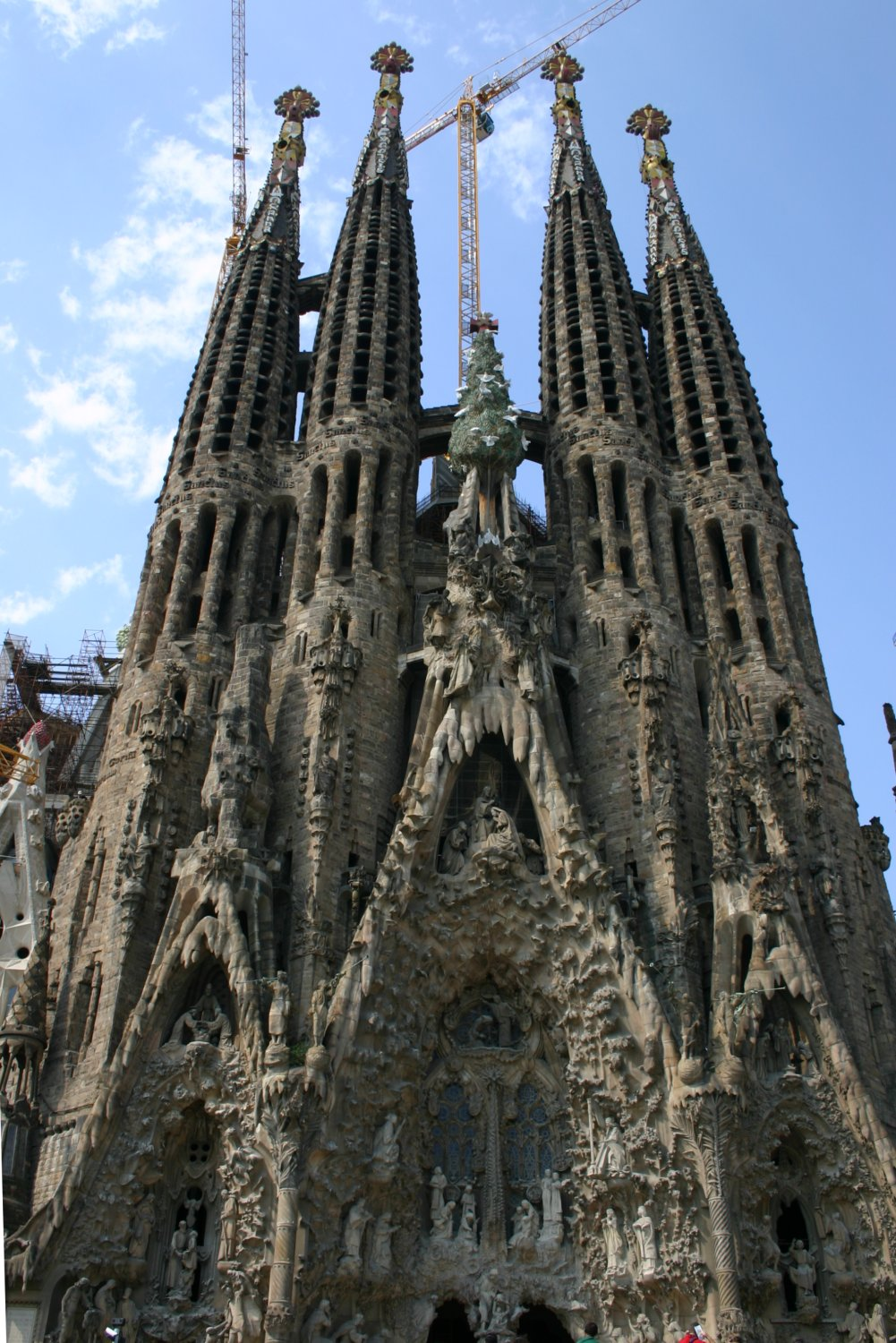
Basilica Sagrada Família in Barcelona

=== Summary of characteristics ===
- Italian cathedrals - Polychrome, defined forms, symmetric plan, domed crossing, free-standing towers
- French cathedrals - Vertical, unified appearance, compact plan, delicate spire called flèche at crossing, two towers at west front and sometimes transept fronts.
- English cathedrals - Horizontal, diverse styles, extending plan, large crossing tower perhaps with spire, two towers at front
- German cathedrals - Massive, block-like, broad plan, octagonal cupola at crossing, multi-towered, one or two tall spires in Gothic period
- Spanish cathedrals - Spacious, ornate, complex plan, diverse roofline, two towers at west front

Note This summary does not preclude the diversity which occurred at different dates for a variety of reasons. One of the influences on diversity of style was the immigration of master masons who often served as architects. Thus William of Sens set the style of Canterbury, and Milan Cathedral is predominantly German Gothic in style.

=== Russia ===
The very first churches in Kievan Rus', such as the wooden St. Sophia Cathedral in Novgorod, had as many as 13 domes, differing in this regard from their mainly single-cupola Byzantine predecessors. The architects of Vladimir-Suzdal switched from brick to white limestone ashlar as their main building material, which provided for dramatically effective church silhouettes, but made church construction very costly. At first the baptistery, narthex, and choir gallery above the narthex were a common feature of Rus' churches, but they largely disappeared by the end of the 12th century, giving way to novel elements such as multiple porches, external chapels, and belfries.

After a century of Byzantine imitations, the Russian masons began to emphasise the verticality in church design. The late 12th century saw the development of so-called tower churches in Polotsk and Smolensk; this design later spread to other areas such as Kiev and Chernihiv. A visual transition between the main cube of the church and the elongated cylinder below the dome was provided by one or several rows of curved corbel arches, known as kokoshniki. A still later development was the introduction of a long conical roof known as "tent-like". St. Basil's Cathedral is the only cathedral church featuring multiple tent-like roofs, but then it is more of a votive church than a cathedral.

The 17th century was marked by the return to the traditional Byzantine model of cathedral and katholikon architecture, with four of six piers supporting the vaults. The six-piered cathedrals were reserved for the most important cities and monasteries. The exterior ornamentation is often limited to a modicum of blind arcading. The large bulbous domes are usually set on tall drums pierced by long narrow windows. This austerity of cathedral architecture contrasts with the continuing experimentation in the design of ordinary parish churches.

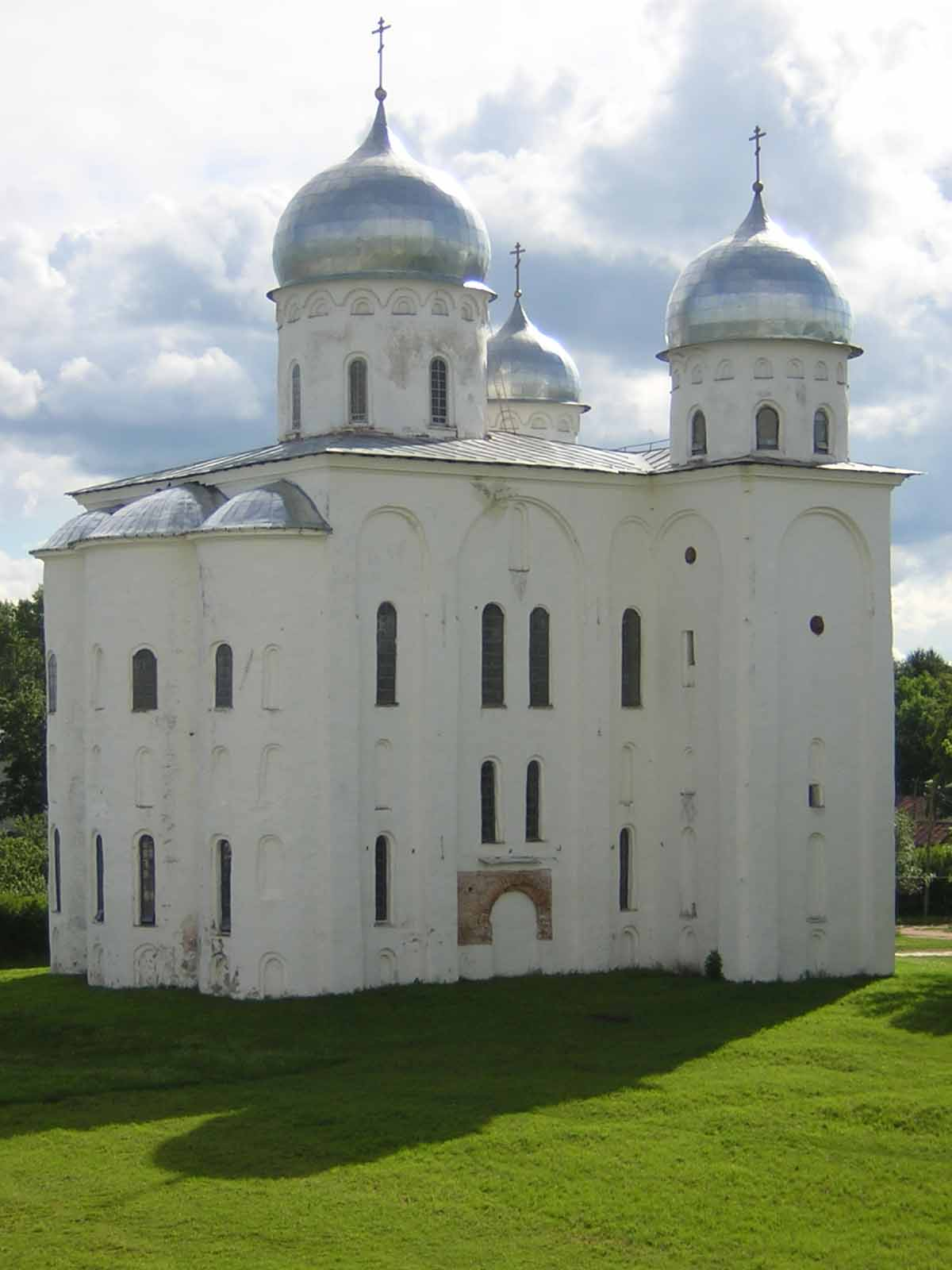
An early Novgorodian katholikon, 1119

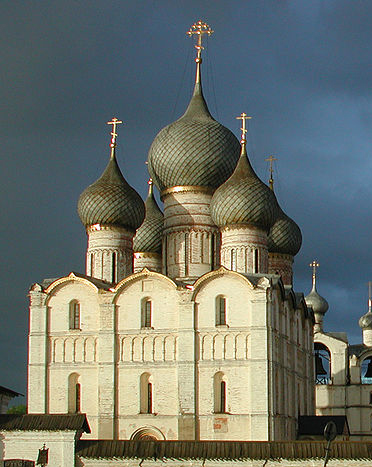
A classical Russian cathedral from ca. 1500

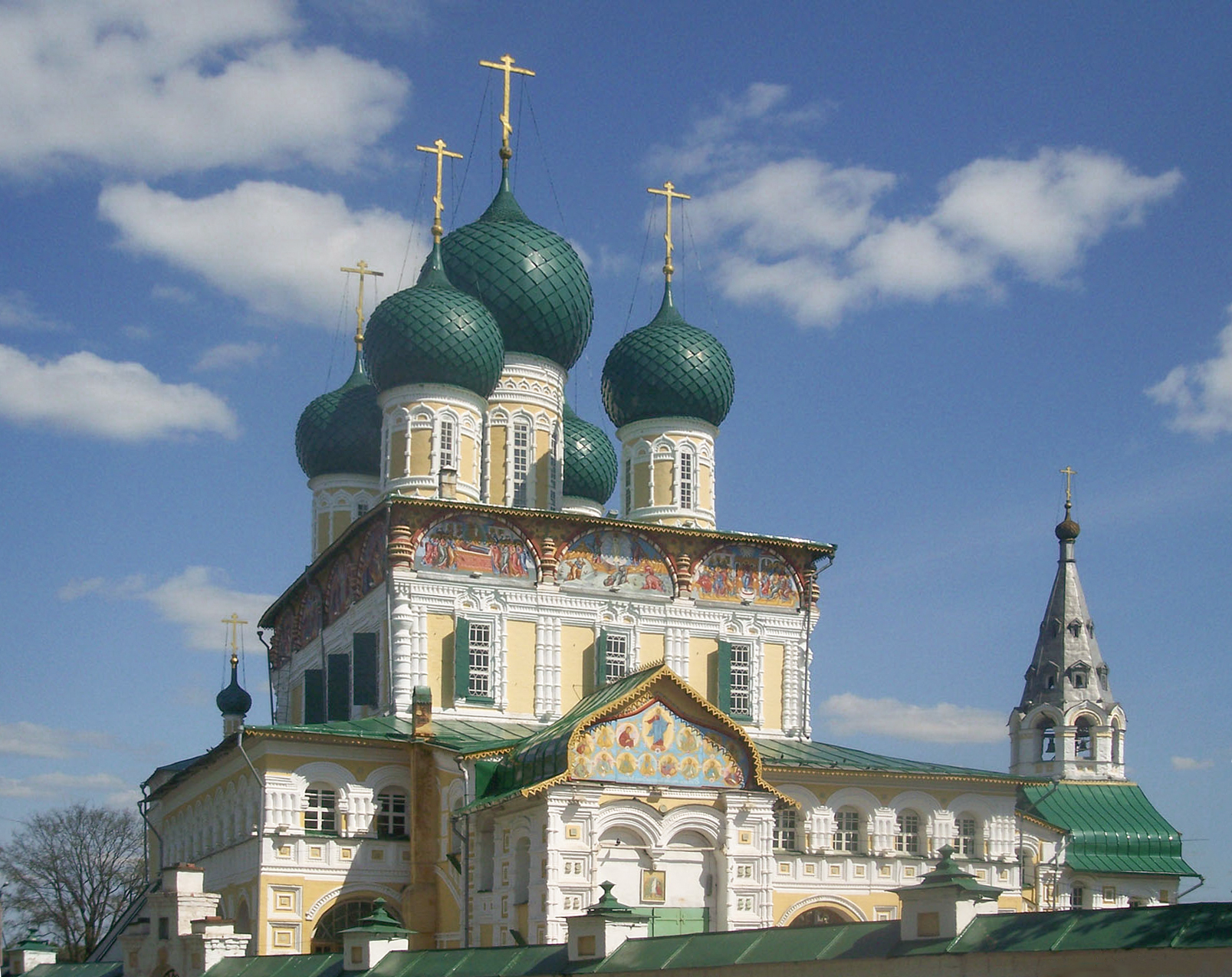
An ornate cathedral from the mid-17th century

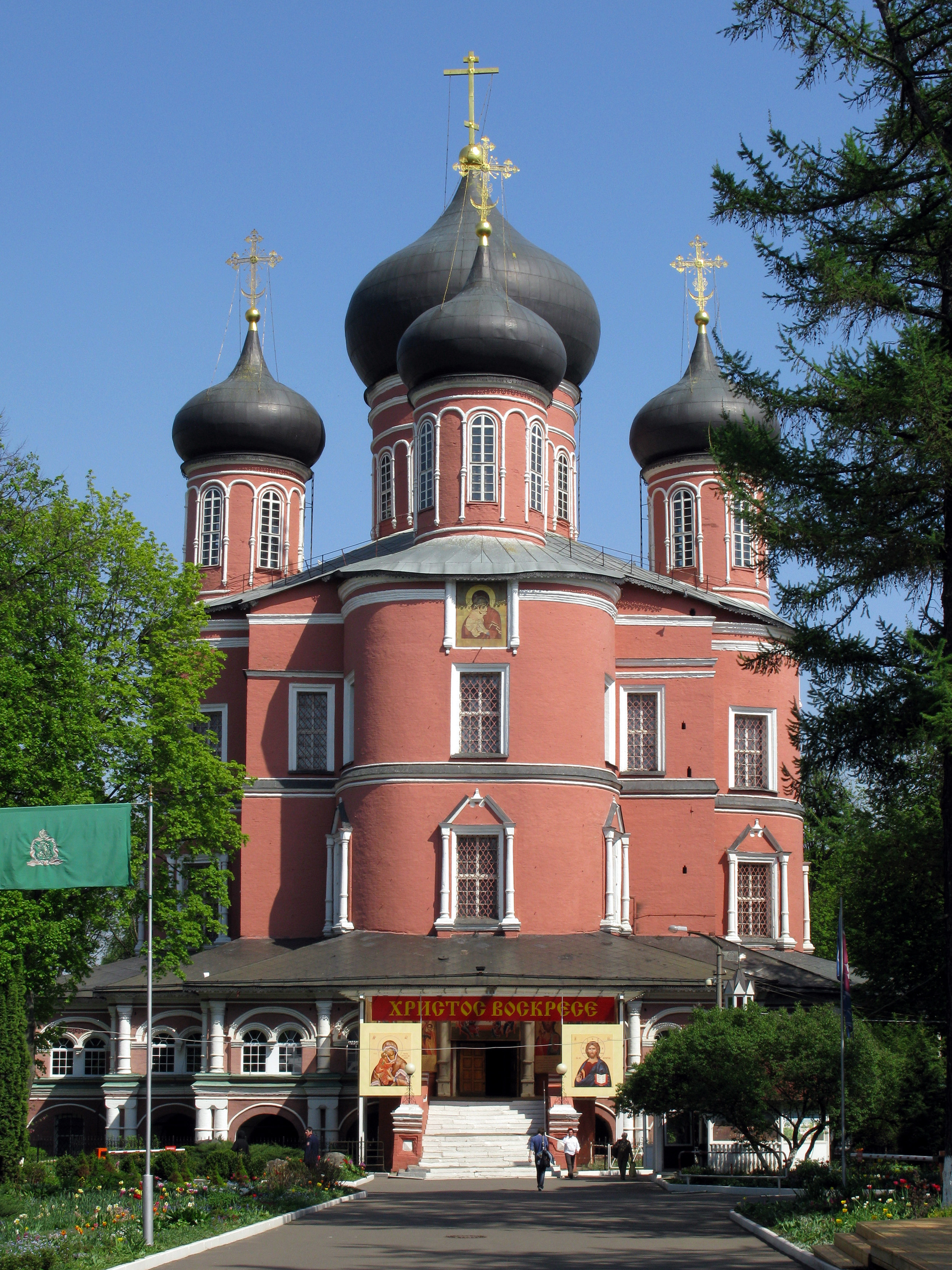
A katholikon from Peter the Great's reign exhibiting Ukrainian influences

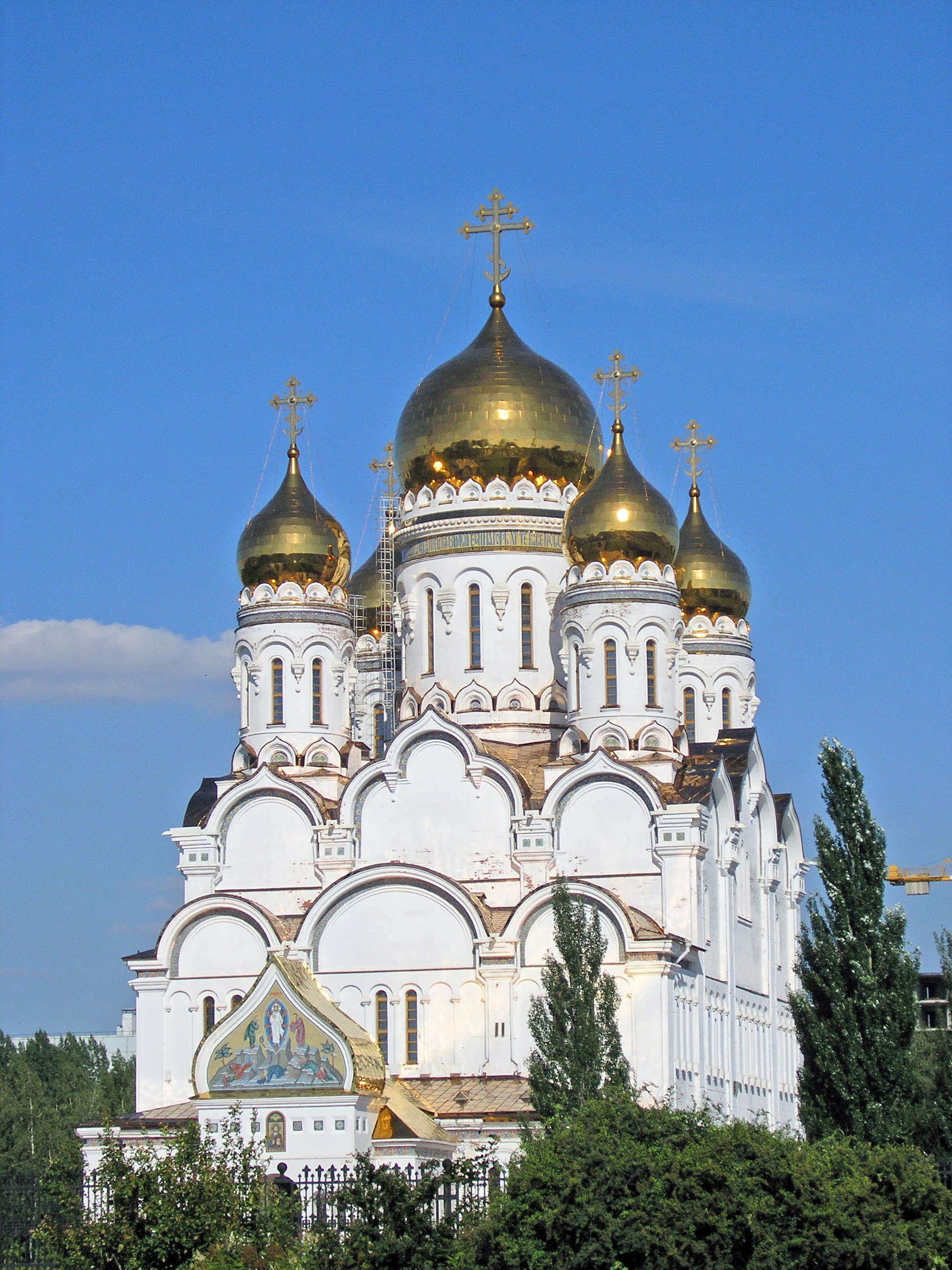
A modern cathedral in Tolyatti

== Cathedrals of other countries of Europe ==
with a summary of characteristics

=== United Kingdom ===
Cathedrals of the United Kingdom

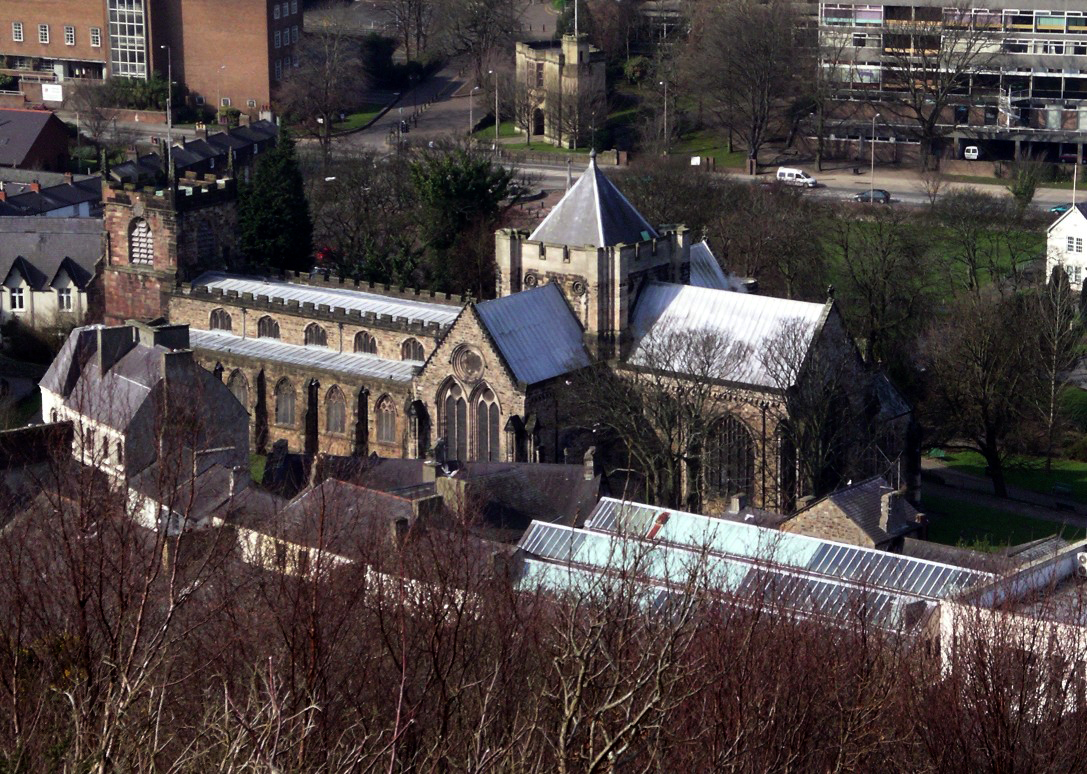
Bangor Cathedral, Wales

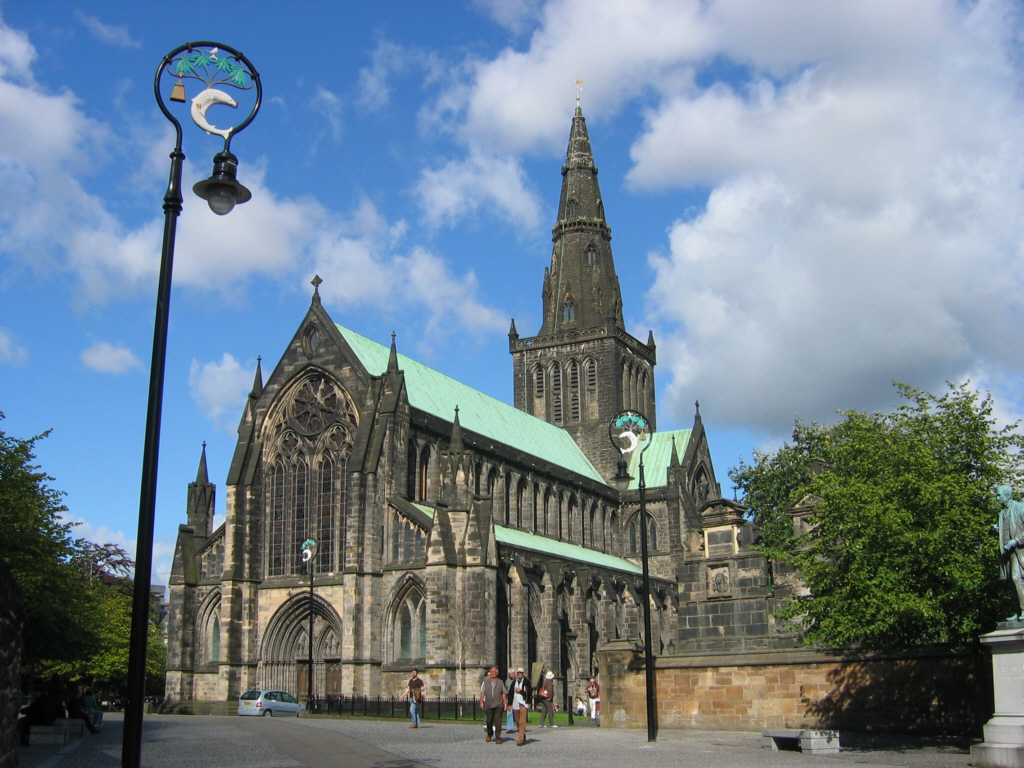
St Mungo's Cathedral, Glasgow Scotland

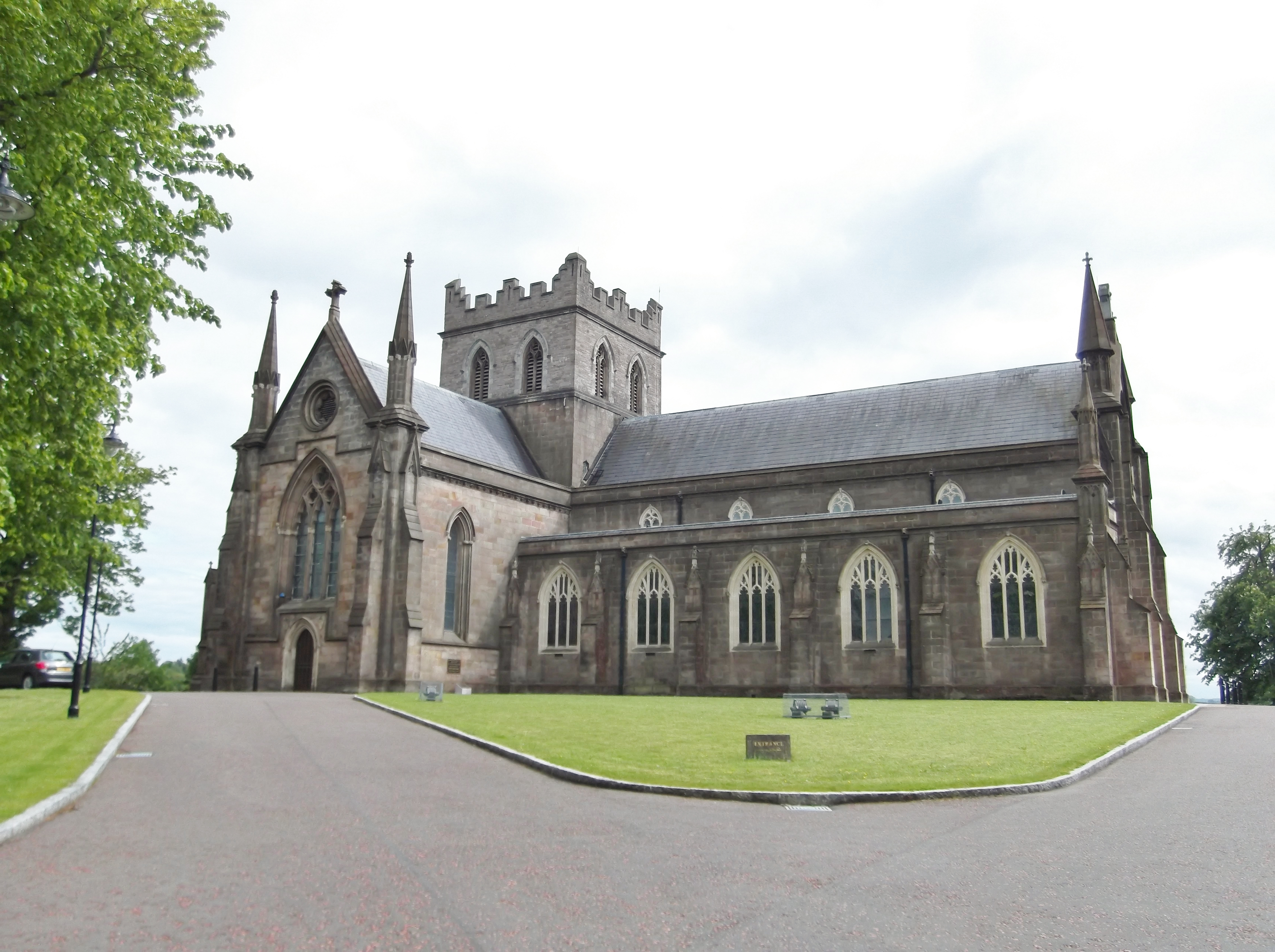
Armagh CoI, Northern Ireland

- Bangor Cathedral, Wales, c.1120-c.1880- Typical of the cathedrals of Britain, this small cathedral demonstrates its long history in its architecture, with no attempt to match the successive styles to each other. Early and late Gothic, Gothic Revival and 20th century sit side by side in a single building.
- St Mungo's, Glasgow, Scotland, 13th century- Built on the site where the bullock stopped the wagon with the body of the saint, this 13th-century building is marked by the proportionally large size of its windows and the single central tower which was once shared by other cathedrals and abbeys of Scotland.
- St Patrick's Cathedral, Armagh (Church of Ireland), Northern Ireland, 1834-1840- Founded in the 5th century, the building has been destroyed many times. The present cathedral is a fine example of pre-Victorian Gothic Revival architecture.

=== Northern Europe ===
Tall spires of Northern Europe

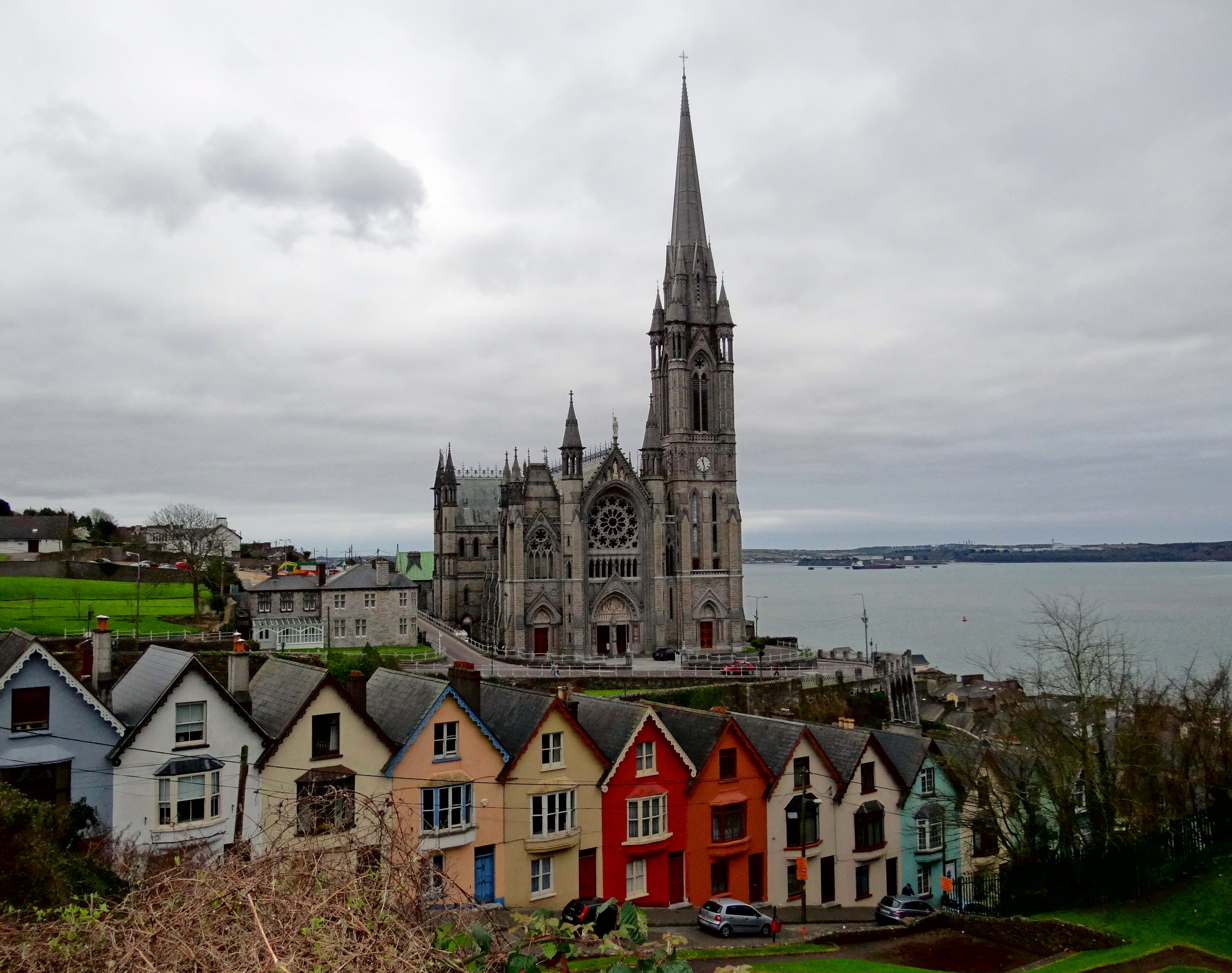
Cobh Cathedral, Republic of Ireland

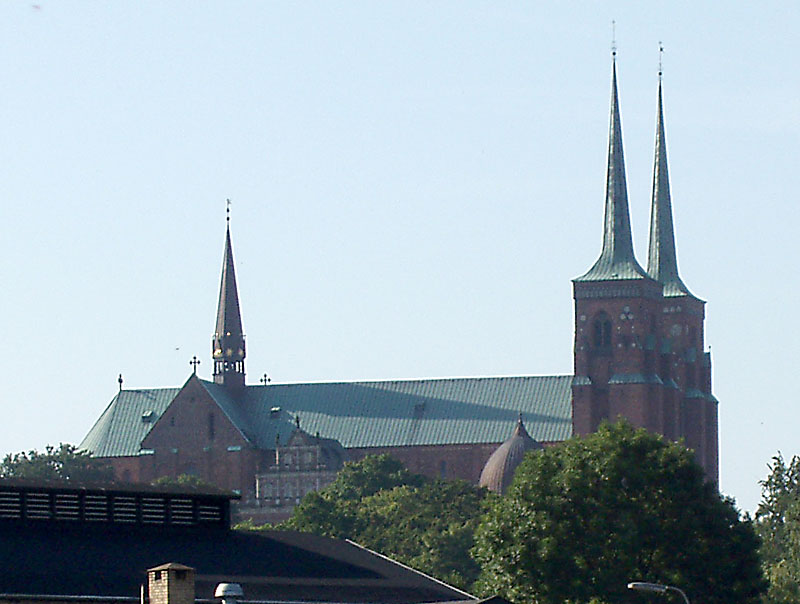
Roskilde Cathedral, Denmark

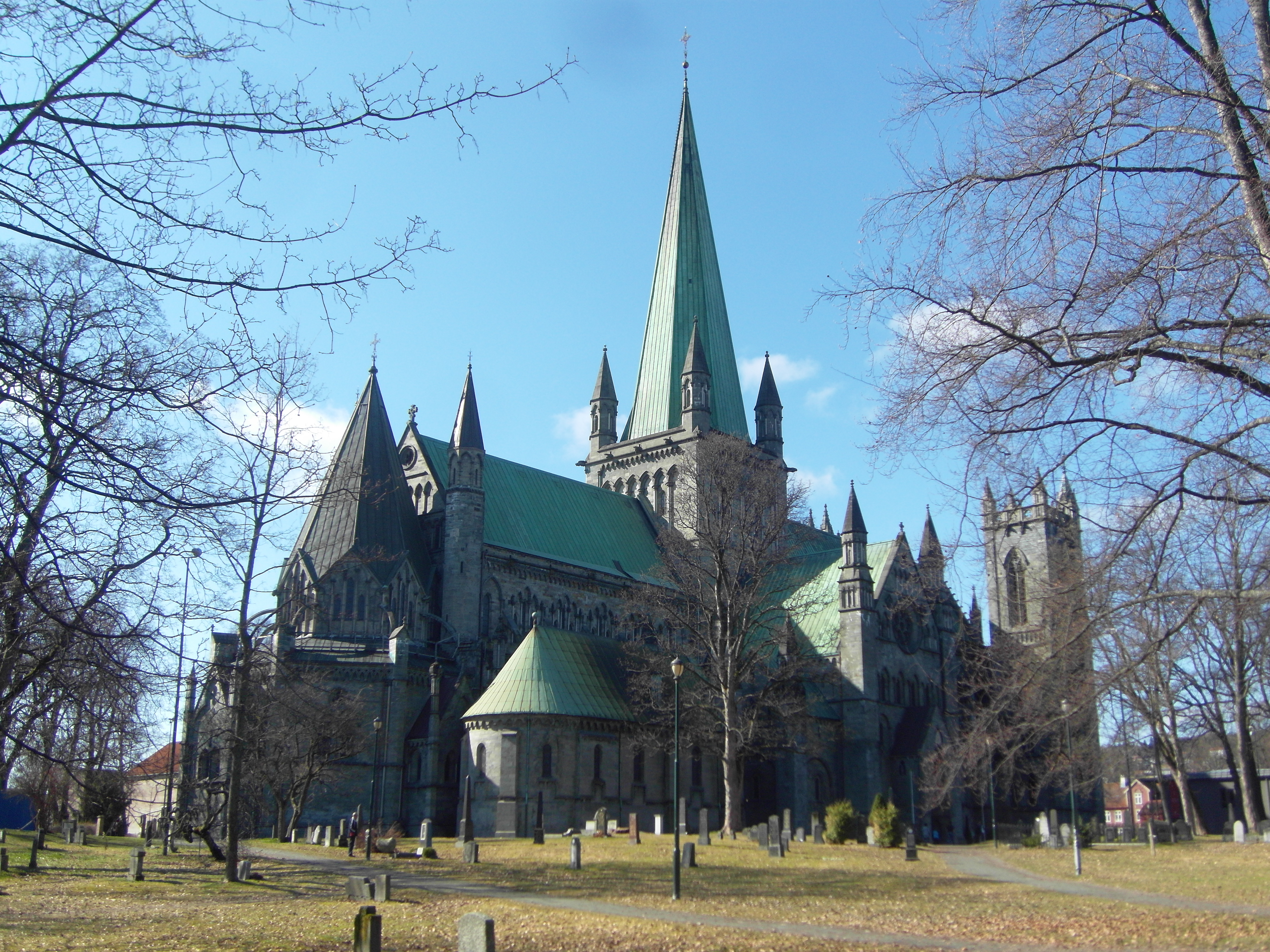
Nidaros Cathedral, Norway

- Cobh Cathedral, Ireland, 1868-1915- Architect, Edward.W.Pugin and others. Cobh Cathedral is in Early French Decorated Gothic style and is one of the best examples of 19th century Gothic Revival in Ireland.
- Roskilde Cathedral, Denmark, c.1150-1300- The combination of simple unadorned brick architecture with copper spires of fanciful and delicate design is typically Danish.
- Nidaros Cathedral, Norway, 1070-1300- Norwegian Medieval architecture was strongly influenced by journeymen English builders who have designed the western part of this building along the lines of Lincoln Cathedral which it strongly resembles. The long sloping roof and tall wood and copper spire is typical of Norway.

=== Romanesque cathedrals ===
Cathedrals in the Romanesque style

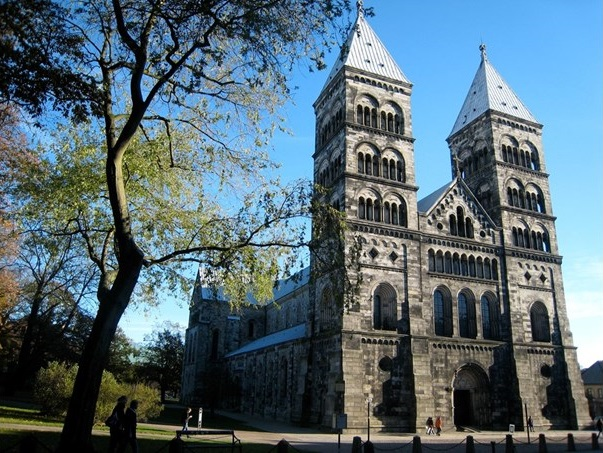
Lund Cathedral, Sweden

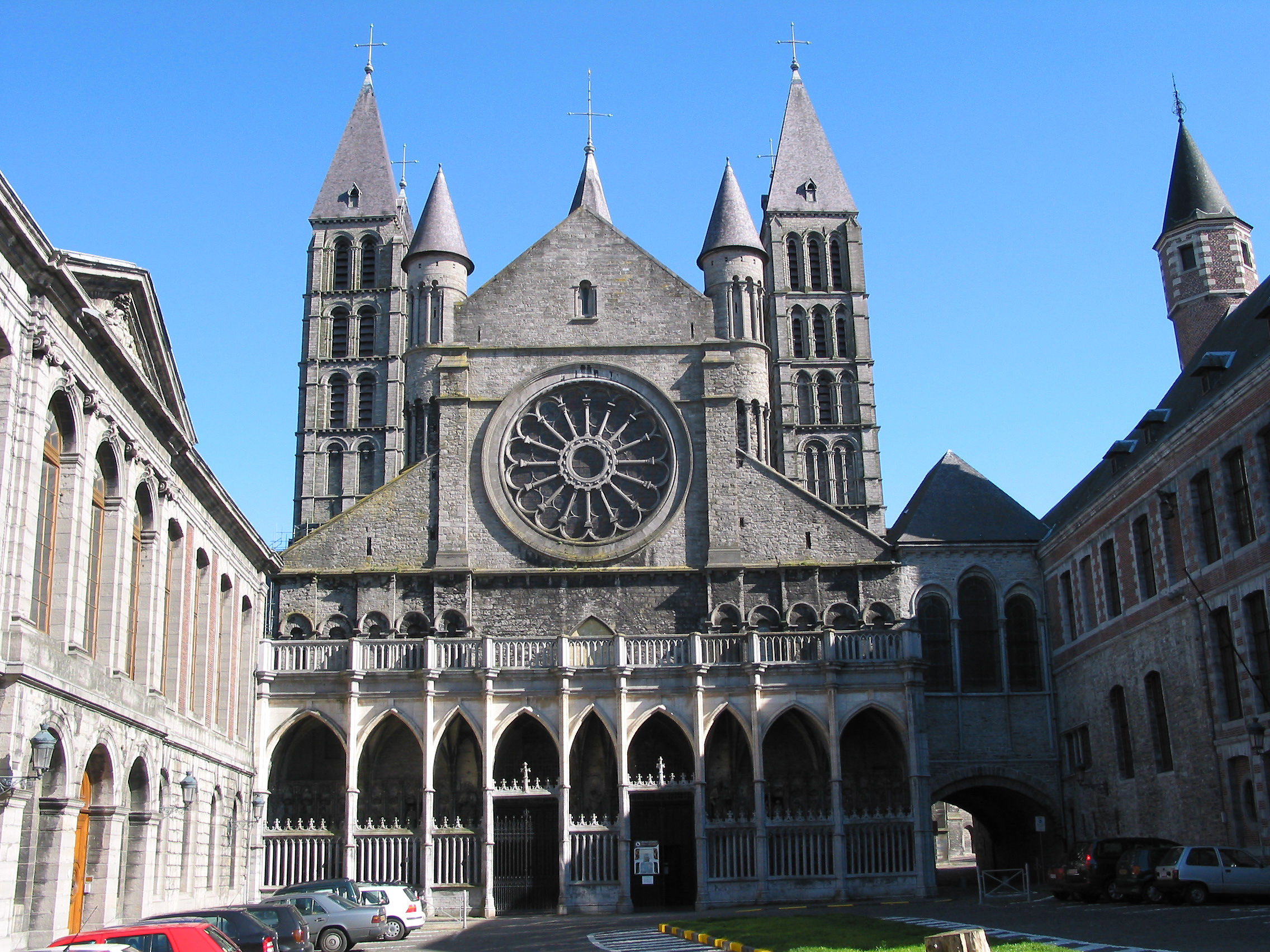
Tournai Cathedral, Belgium

Lisboa Cathedral, Portugal

- Lund Cathedral, Sweden, 1060-1250- This important example of Romanesque architecture is marked by its adherence to the Italian Latin cross plan with simple apse. The massive western towers with their wooden spires are typical of Romanesque throughout Northern Europe.
- Tournai Cathedral, Belgium, 1100-1255- The building is a combination of massing of Romanesque forms and multiple towers in the German style with French Gothic style chancel and chevet. The architecture of this building was widely influential.
- Lisbon Cathedral, Portugal, 1147–1500, 1755-20th century- The fortress-like quality, cavernous single doorway, pointed battlements and highly functional appearance of this cathedral is typical of the Romanesque architecture that prevailed, despite acknowledgement to the Gothic style.

=== Gothic cathedrals ===
Cathedrals in the Gothic style

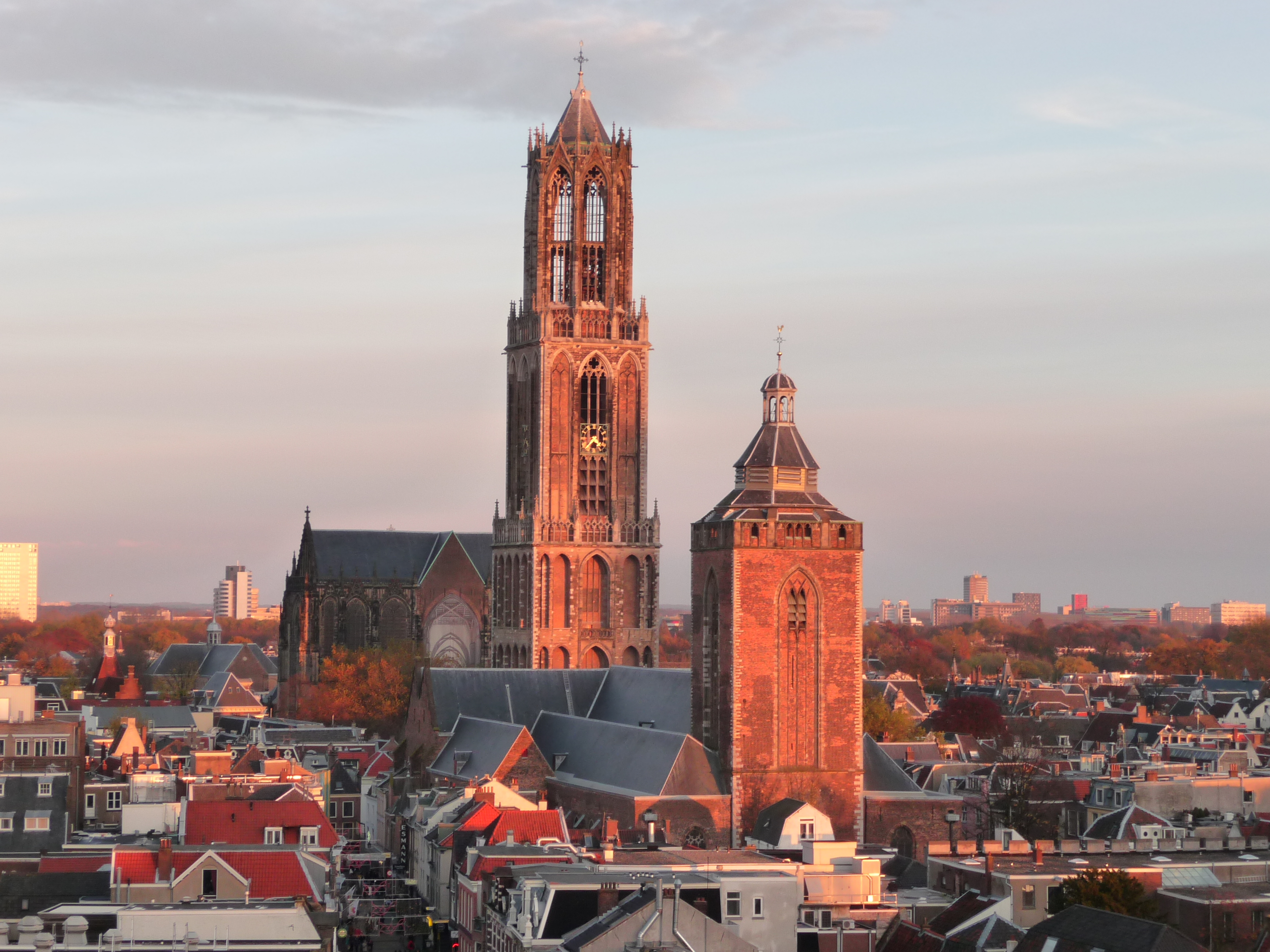
Utrecht, Netherlands with Buurkerk in the foreground

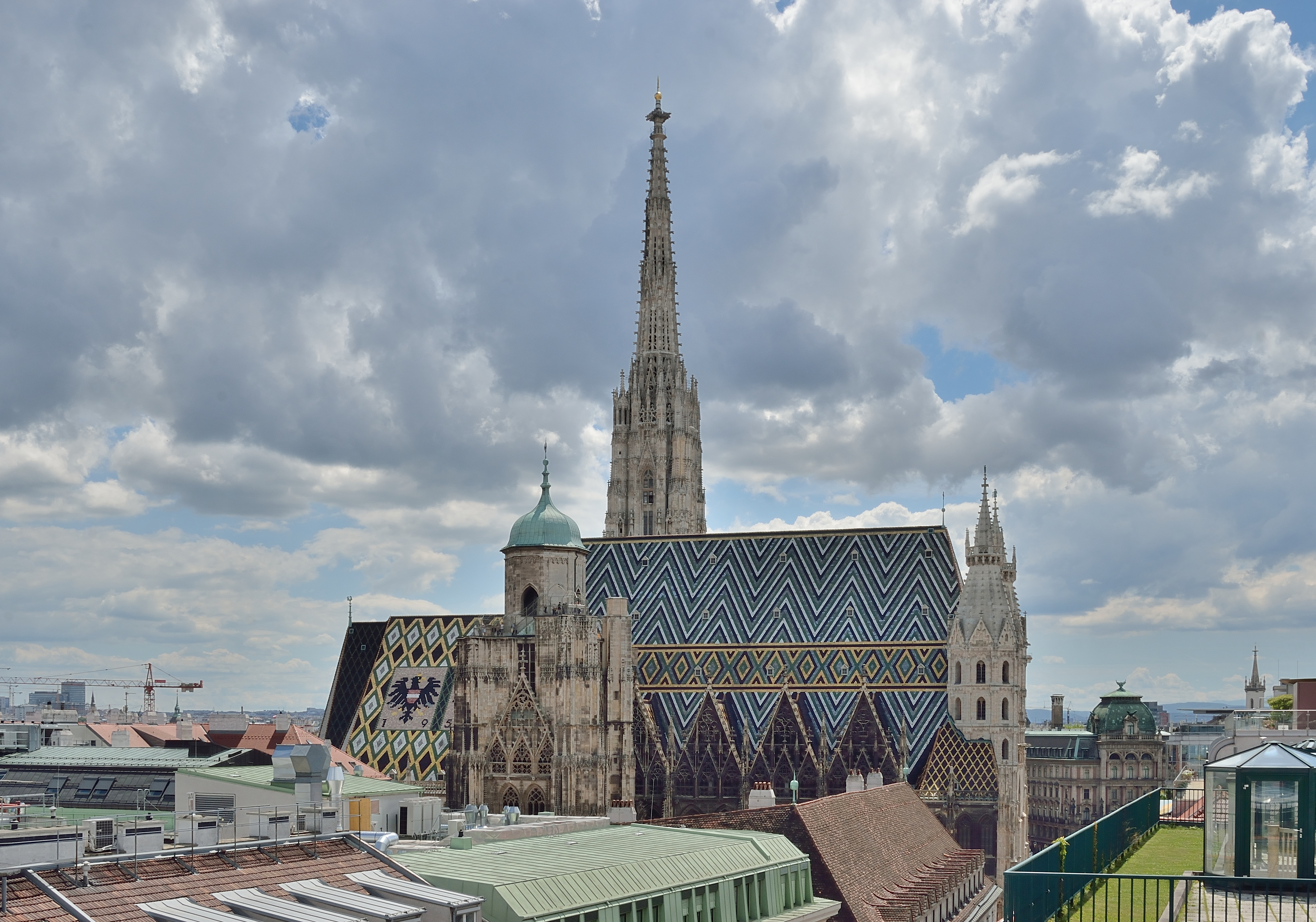
St Stephen's, Vienna, Austria,

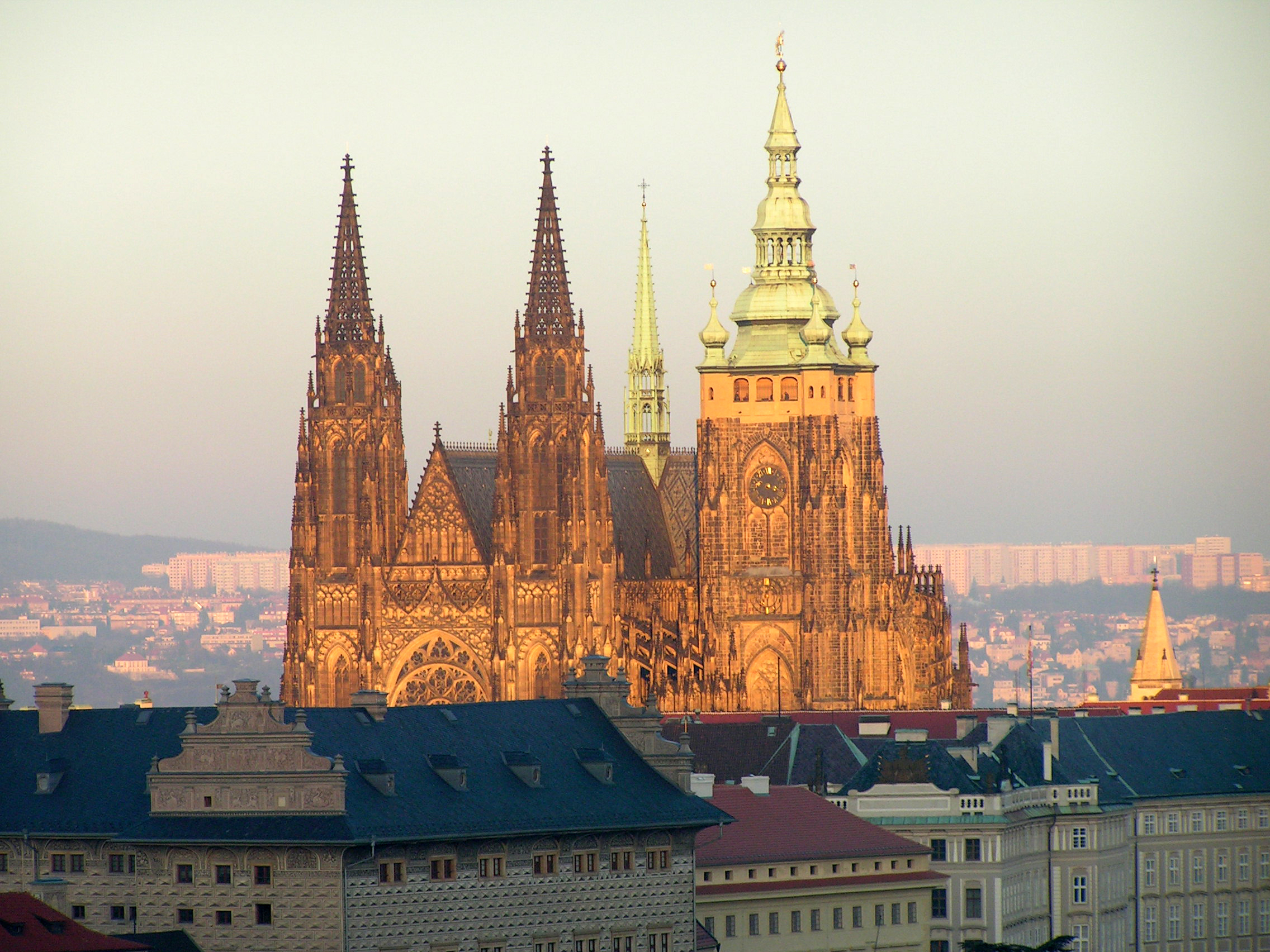
St Vitus Cathedral, Czech Republic

- Cathedral of Saint Martin, Utrecht, Netherlands, c.1254-1515- The only Gothic cathedral in The Netherlands and the first Gothic building in that country. Modelled after French examples but with only one tower.
- Stephan's Dom, Austria, 1147-1557– The cathedral has a huge expanse of steep roof with decorative brightly coloured tiles, Flamboyant tracery, an asymmetrically placed tower and an open-work spire of German style.
- St. Vitus Cathedral, Czech Republic, 1344-1927- This ornate Gothic cathedral was left incomplete in the medieval period, and continued in the Gothic style in the 19th century. Some Baroque features appear, such as the landmark spire of the southern tower.

=== Baroque cathedrals ===
Cathedrals in the Baroque style

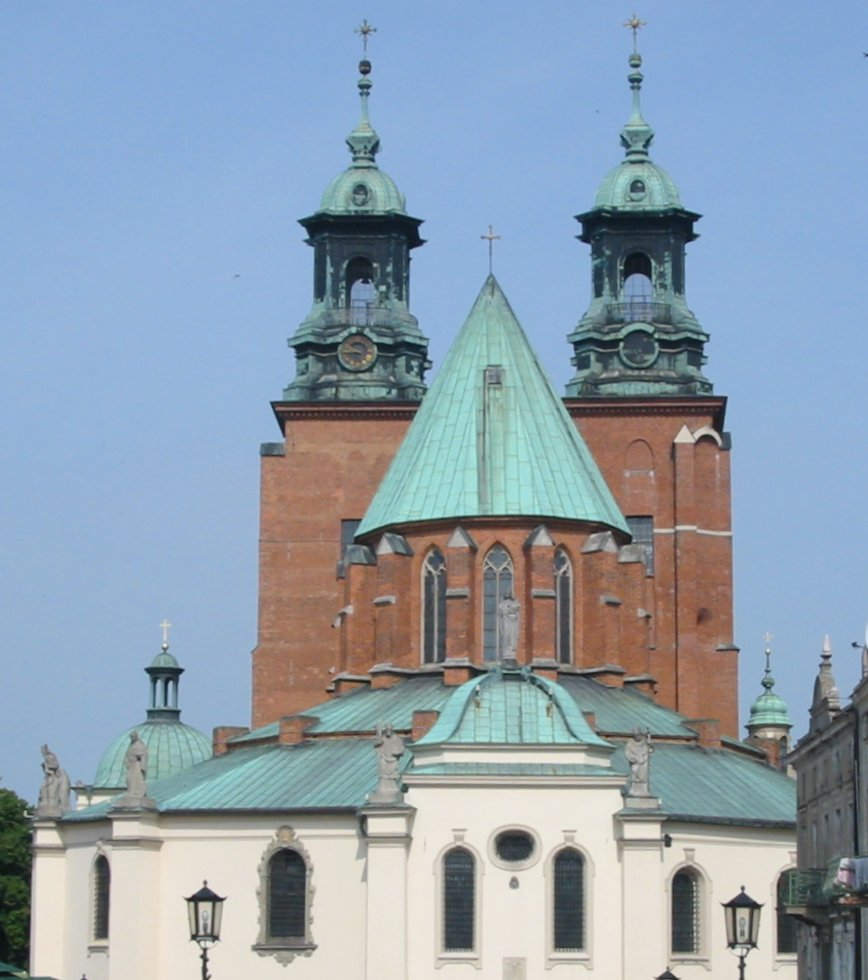
Gniezno Cathedral, Poland

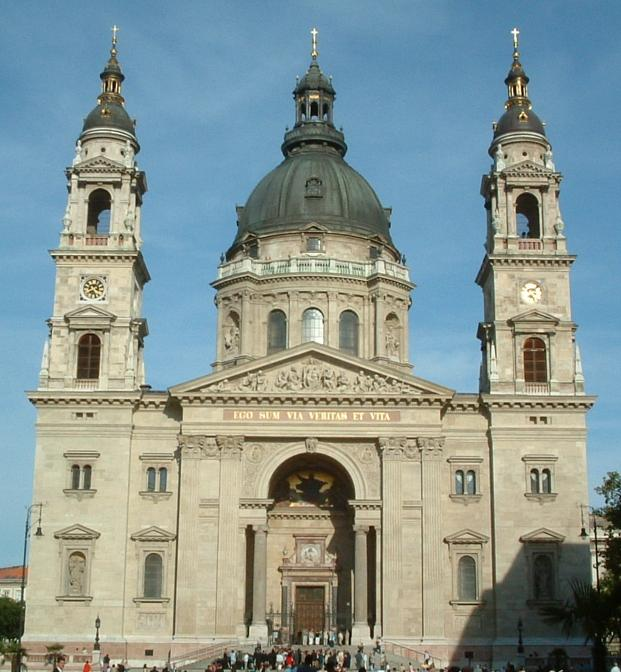
St Stephen's Basilica, Hungary

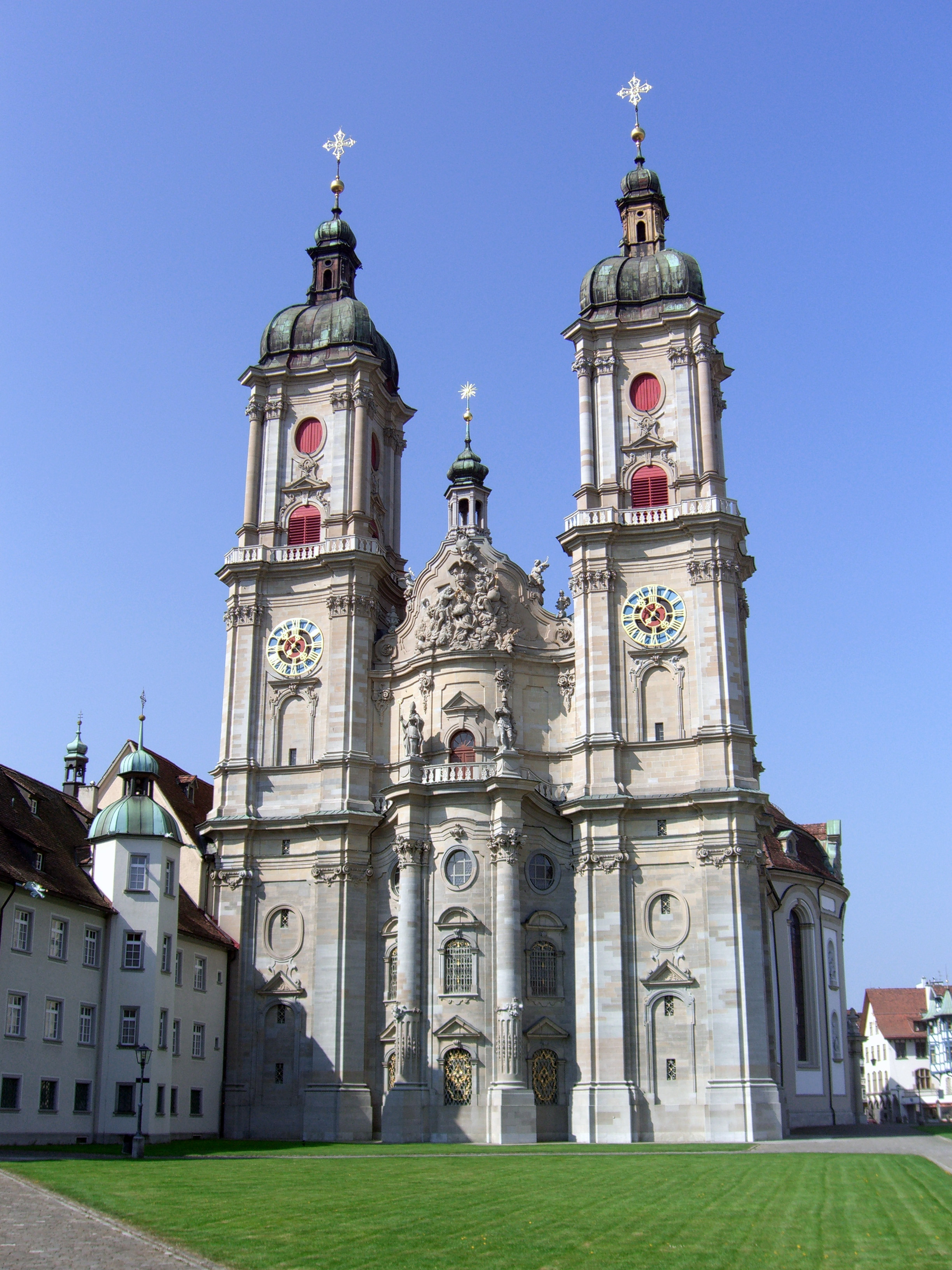
St Gallen Cathedral, Switzerland

- Gniezno Cathedral, Poland, 12th-17th century- A Brick Gothic building with substantial Baroque additions such as the characteristic lantern turrets on the towers.
- St Stephen's Basilica, Budapest, Hungary, 1850-1905- This is one of several large and significant churches in Neo-Classical style in Hungary, marked by a pedimented façade and high dome over the crossing.
- St Gallen Cathedral, Switzerland, 1755-1768- Architect, Peter Thumb. Superficially this monastic building presents a standard West Front with twin towers framing a gabled end. But this is a Baroque Cathedral. The towers are framing the apsidal eastern end in the manner of a German Romanesque church. Every detail has a curving playful quality typical of the Baroque style which spread throughout central and eastern Europe.

=== Cathedrals of the Baltic States ===
Cathedrals of the Baltic States

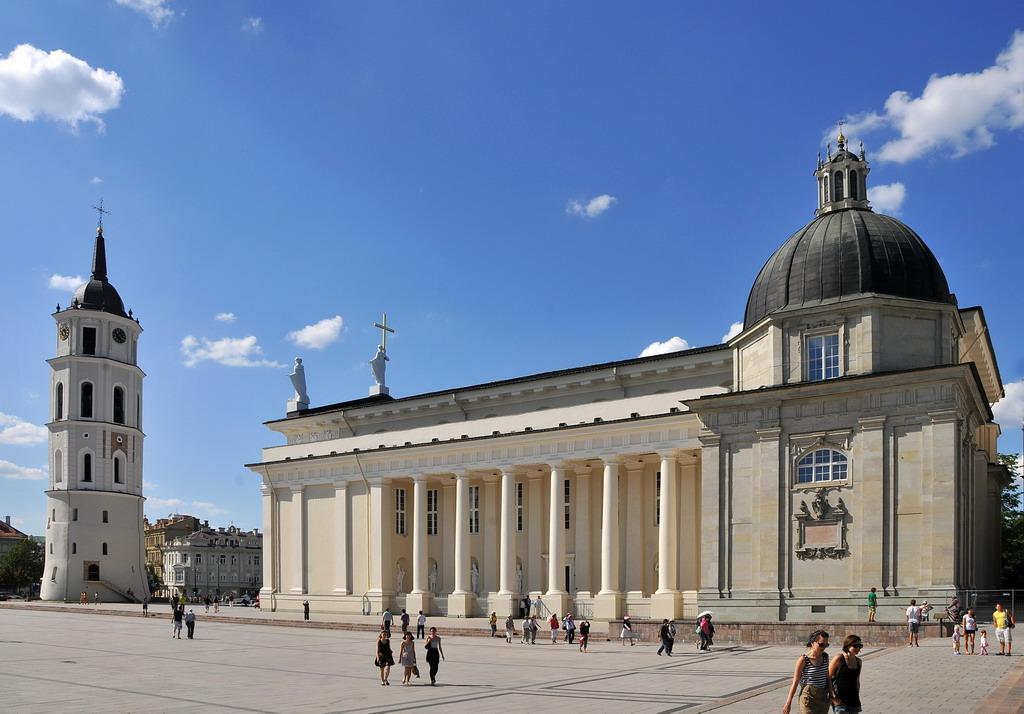
Vilnius Cathedral, Lithuania

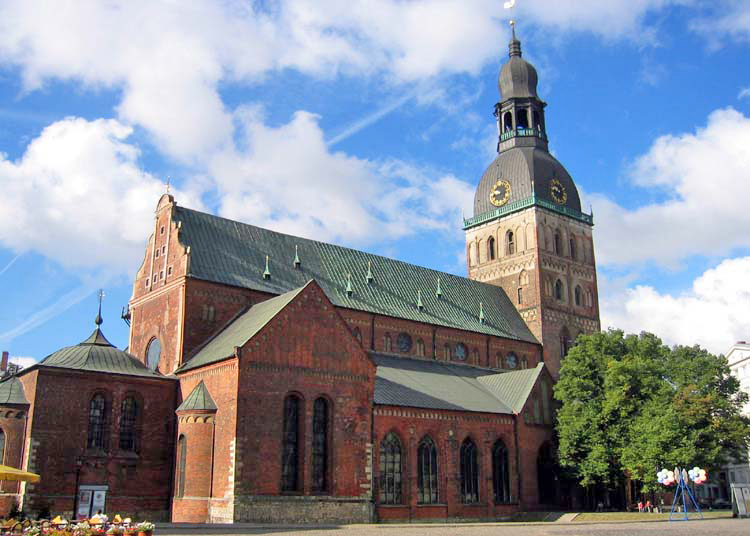
Riga Cathedral, Latvia

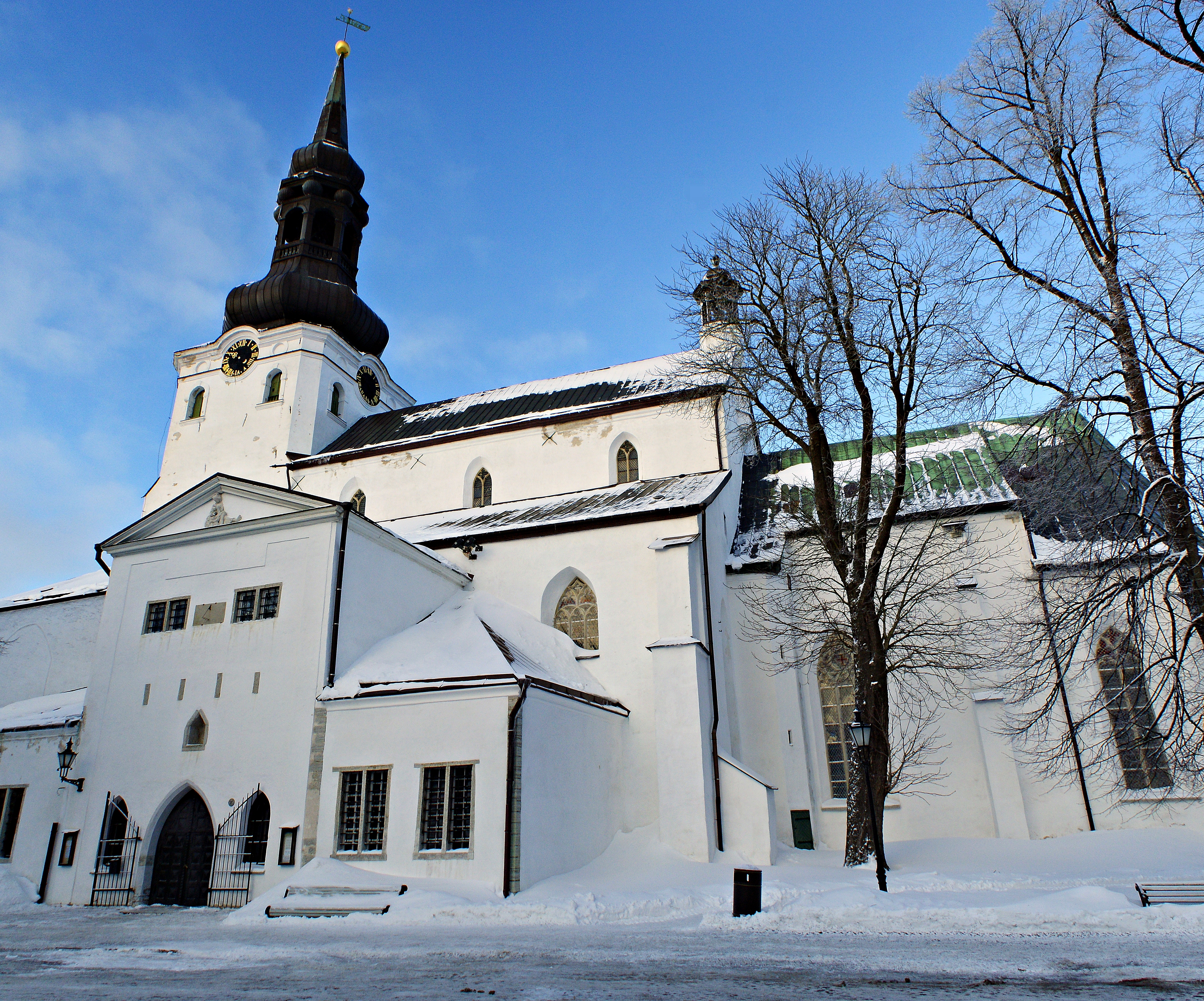
St. Mary's Cathedral, Tallinn, Estonia

- Vilnius Cathedral, Lithuania, 1779-1783- Cathedral built in the Neo-Classical style, resembling a Greek temple, with a detached Baroque bell tower. Traces of the original medieval building survive within.
- Riga Cathedral, Latvia, 13th-15th centuries- This one-towered cathedral's long history is matched in its architecture, a mix of Romanesque, Neo-Gothic, Baroque and Art Nouveau, with no one style predominating.
- St Mary's Cathedral, Tallinn, Estonia, 14th-15th centuries- Only the exterior survives from the original medieval cathedral, after it was severely damaged in a fire in 1684. The remainder mostly dates from the 17th and 18th centuries. The spire was added in 1779.

=== Cathedrals of the Balkans ===
Cathedrals of the Balkans
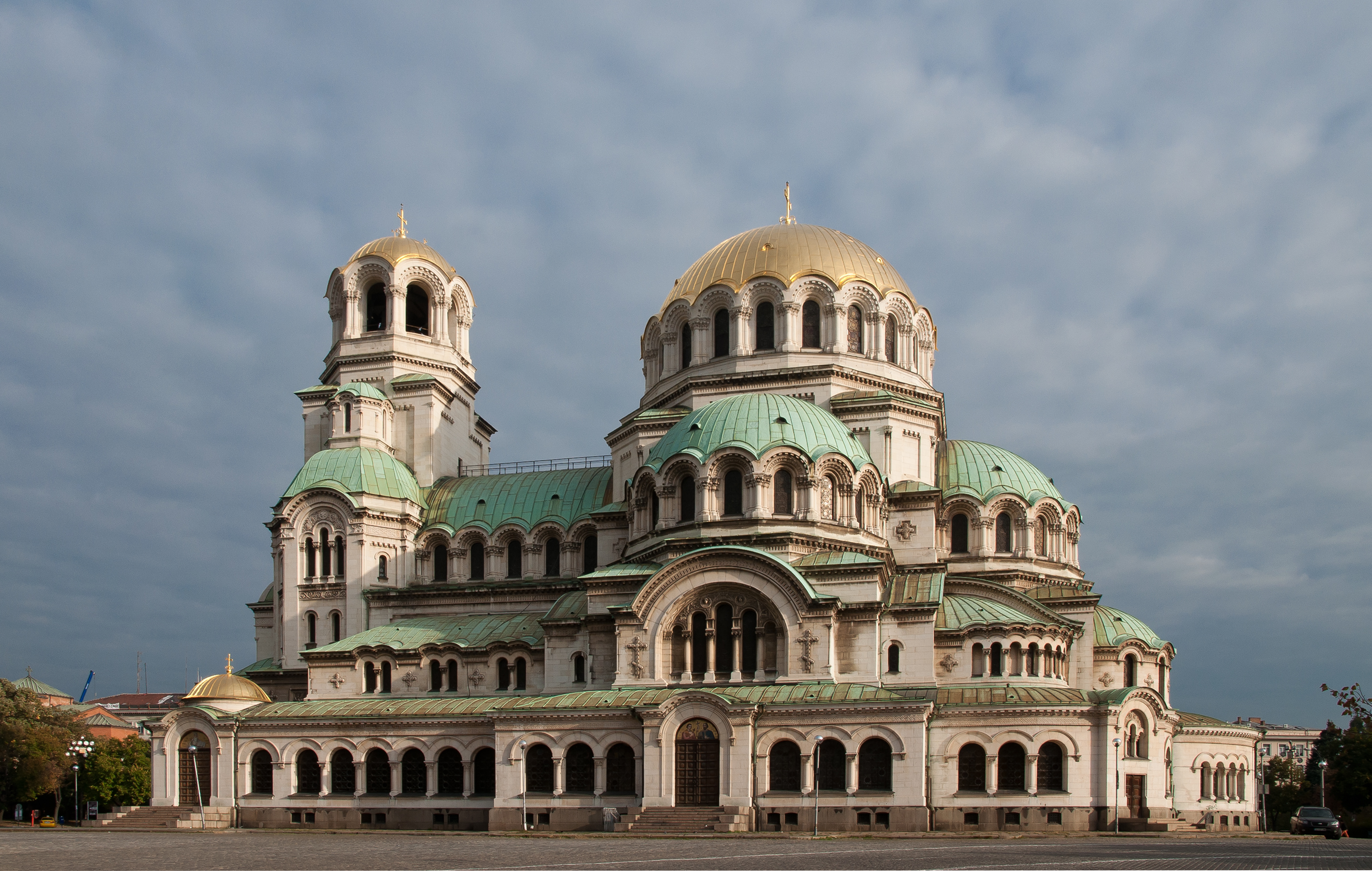
- Alexander Nevsky Cathedral, Sofia, Bulgaria, 1882-1912- is Neo Byzantine with a gold-plated central dome and a bell tower.

== See also ==
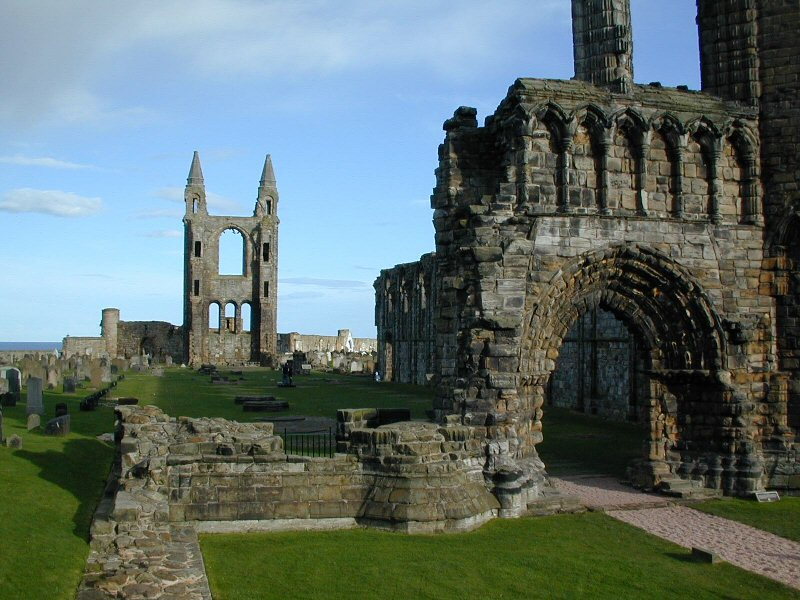
St. Andrew's Cathedral, St. Andrews, Scotland

- List of cathedrals
- Christianity
- Poor Man's Bible
- Architecture of the medieval cathedrals of England
- Gothicmed

=== Architectural styles ===
- Early Christian art and architecture
- Byzantine Architecture
- Romanesque Architecture
- Gothic Architecture
- Renaissance architecture
- Baroque Architecture
- Victorian Architecture

=== Architectural features ===
- Cathedral Architecture - Development of the Eastern End in England and France
- Cathedral diagram, with descriptions of: nave, aisle, quire/choir, apse, chevet, Lady Chapel, porch
- Triforium
- Clerestory
- Vault
- Rose window

=== Decorative features ===
- Stained glass
  - British and Irish stained glass (1811–1918)
- Gargoyle
- Grotesque
- Labours of the Months
- Tree of Jesse
