= Cathedral =

Christian church that is the seat of a bishop

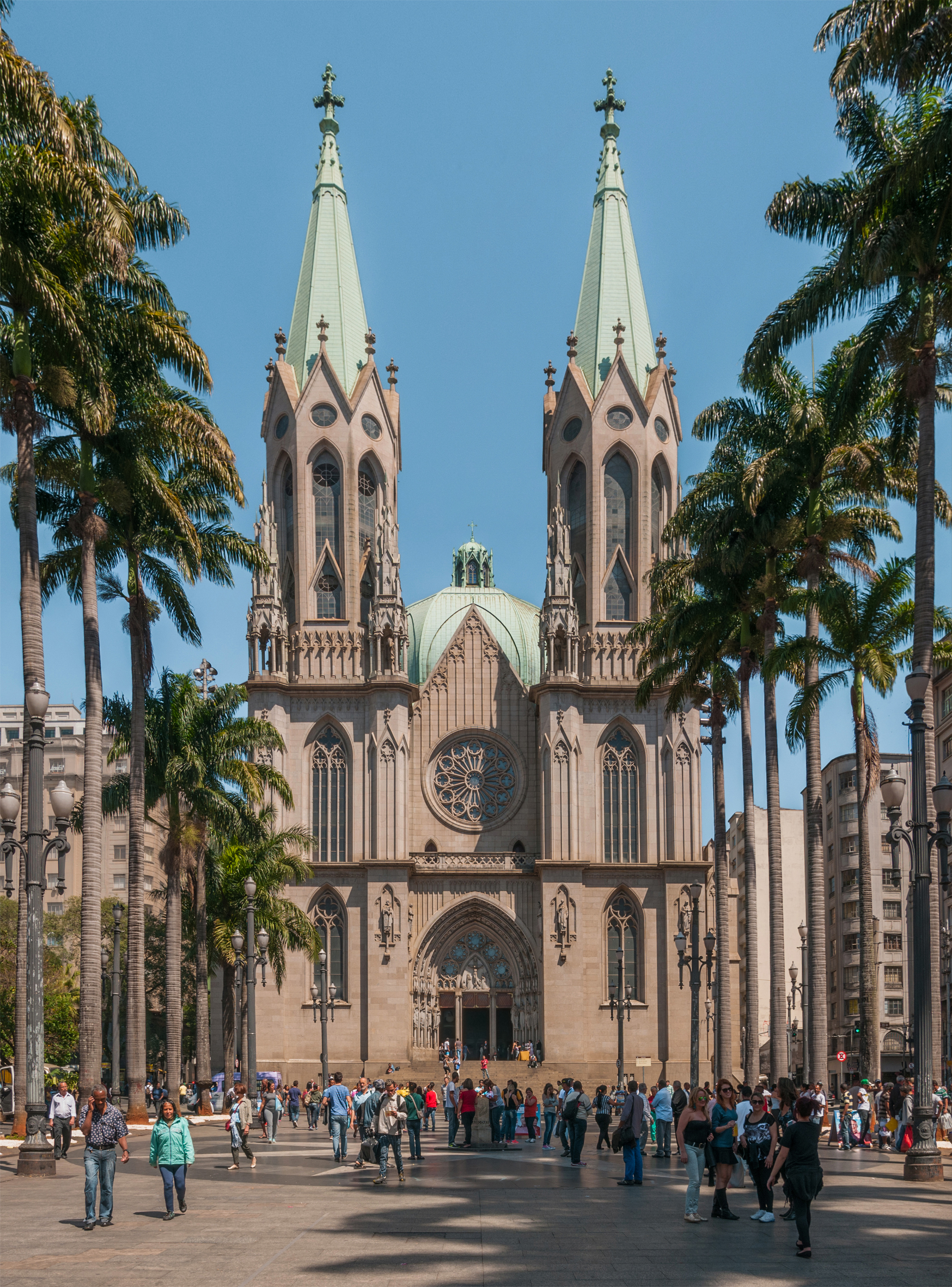
São Paulo Cathedral in Brazil is a representative modern cathedral built in Neo-Gothic style.

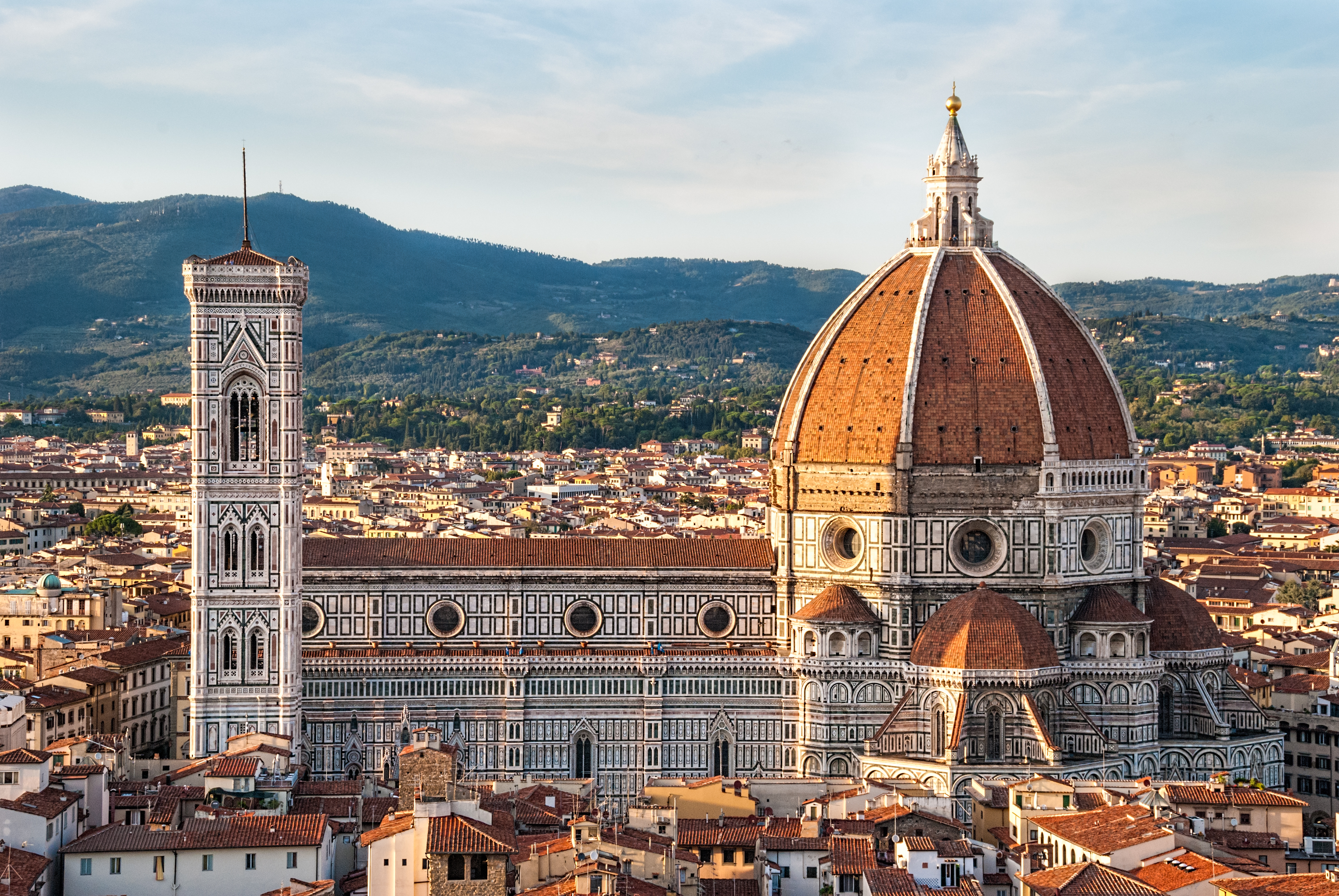
The Santa Maria del Fiore Cathedral in Florence in Italy. Its dome by Filippo Brunelleschi, the largest brick dome in the world, is considered a masterpiece of world architecture.

A cathedral is a church that contains the cathedra (Greek for 'seat') of a bishop, thus serving as the central church of a diocese, conference, or episcopate. Churches with the function of "cathedral" are usually specific to those Christian denominations with an episcopal hierarchy, such as the Catholic, Eastern Orthodox, Anglican, and some Lutheran churches. Church buildings embodying the functions of a cathedral first appeared in Italy, Gaul, Spain, and North Africa in the 4th century, but cathedrals did not become universal within the Western Catholic Church until the 12th century, by which time they had developed architectural forms, institutional structures, and legal identities distinct from parish churches, monastic churches, and episcopal residences. The cathedral is more important in the hierarchy than the church because it is from the cathedral that the bishop governs the area under their administrative authority.

Following the Protestant Reformation, the Christian church in several parts of Western Europe, such as Scotland, the Netherlands, certain Swiss Cantons and parts of Germany, adopted a presbyterian polity that did away with bishops altogether. Where ancient cathedral buildings in these lands are still in use for congregational worship, they generally retain the title and dignity of "cathedral", maintaining and developing distinct cathedral functions, but devoid of hierarchical supremacy. From the 16th century onwards, but especially since the 19th century, churches originating in Western Europe have undertaken vigorous programmes of missionary activity, leading to the founding of large numbers of new dioceses with associated cathedral establishments of varying forms in Asia, Africa, Australasia, Oceania and the Americas. In addition, both the Catholic Church and Orthodox churches have formed new dioceses within formerly Protestant lands for converts and migrant co-religionists. Consequently, it is not uncommon to find Christians in a single city being served by three or more cathedrals of differing denominations.

== Etymology and definition ==
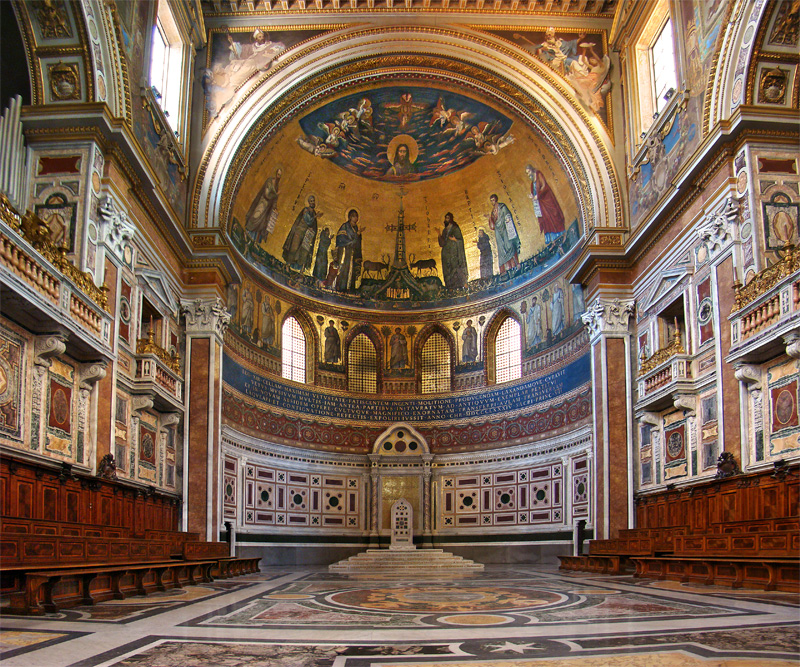
The cathedra of the pope as bishop of Rome, Archbasilica of Saint John Lateran

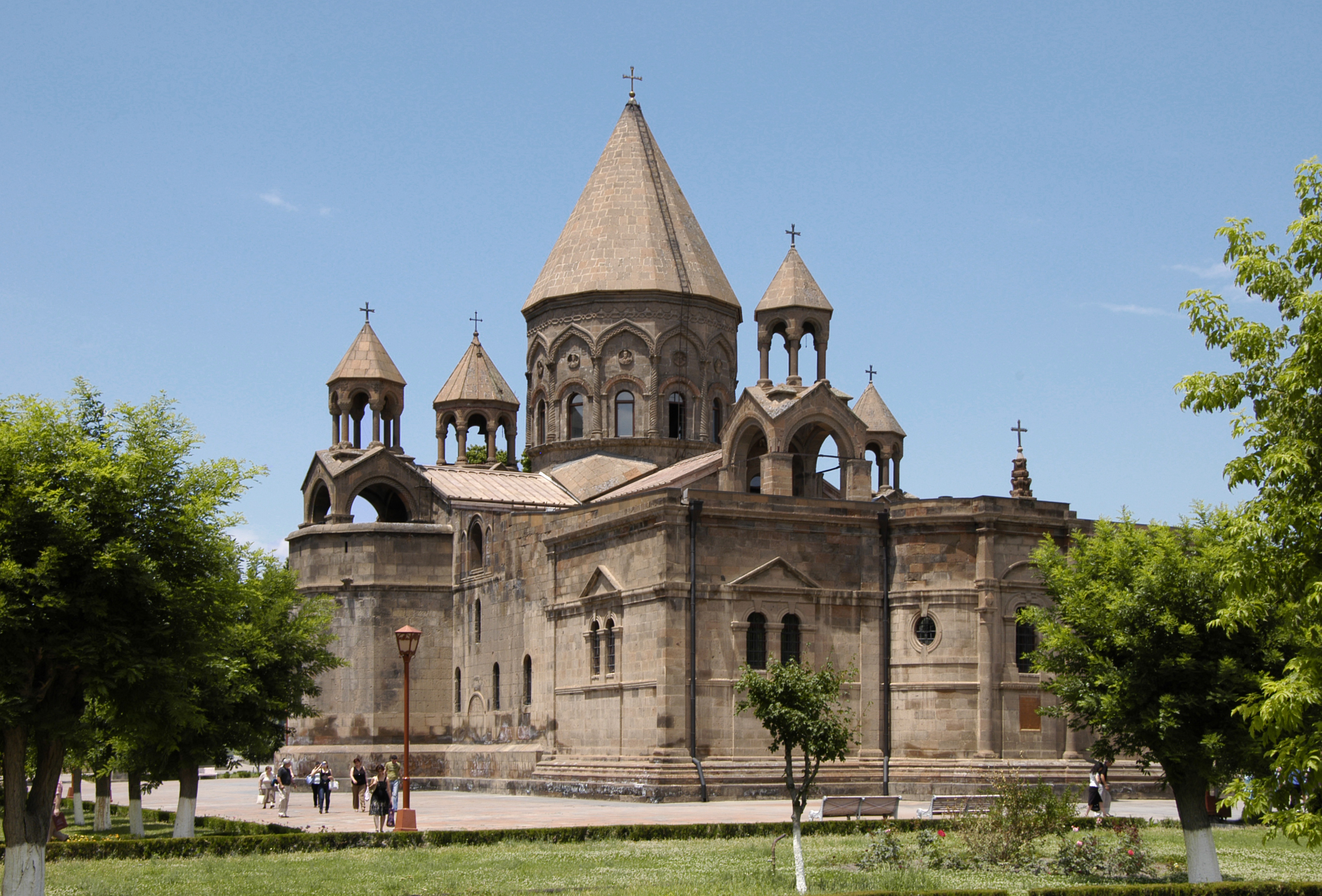
Etchmiadzin cathedral in Vagarshapat, Armenia, believed to be the oldest cathedral in the world.

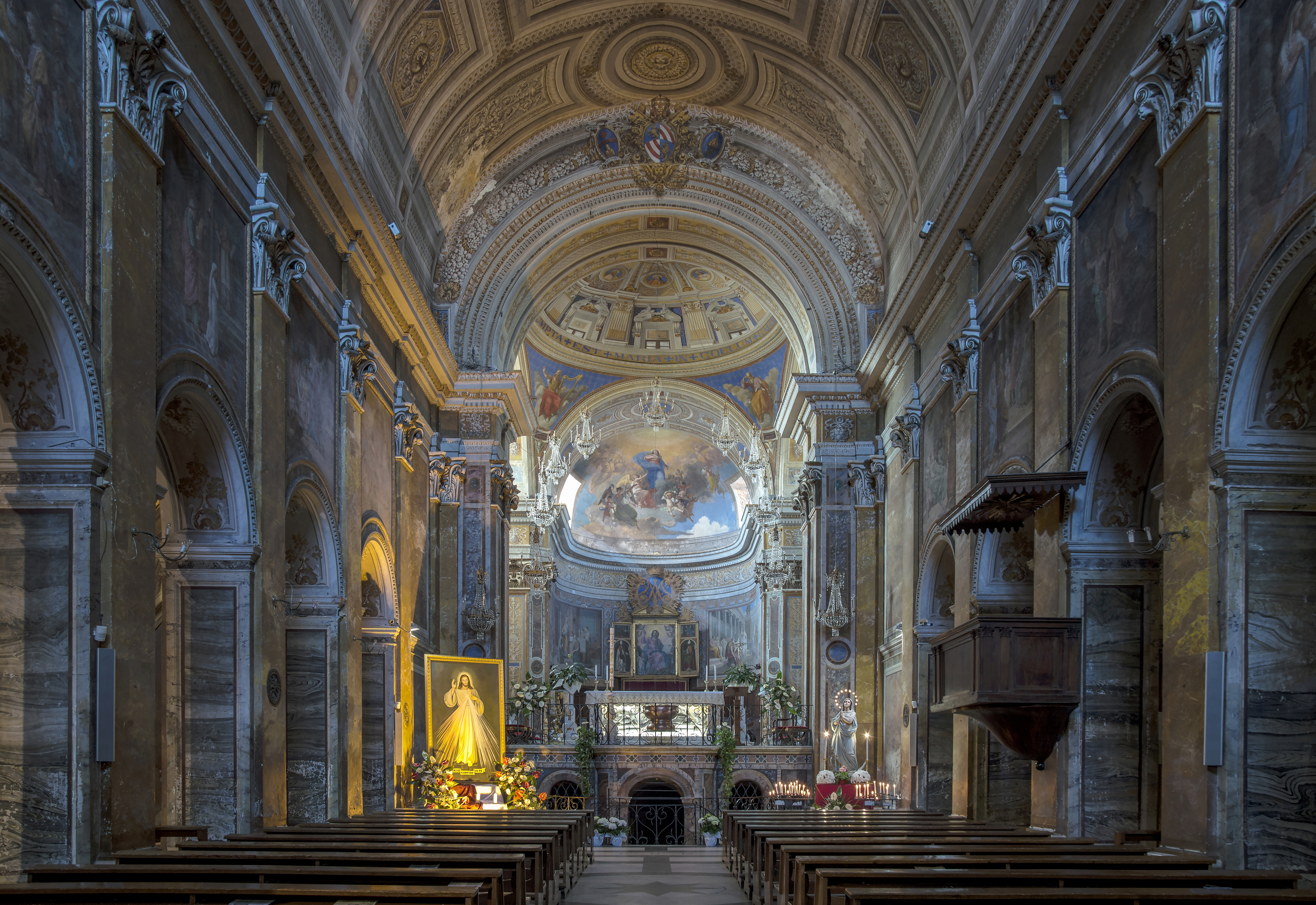
The Cathedral of Santa Maria Assunta is a Catholic cathedral in Nepi, Italy

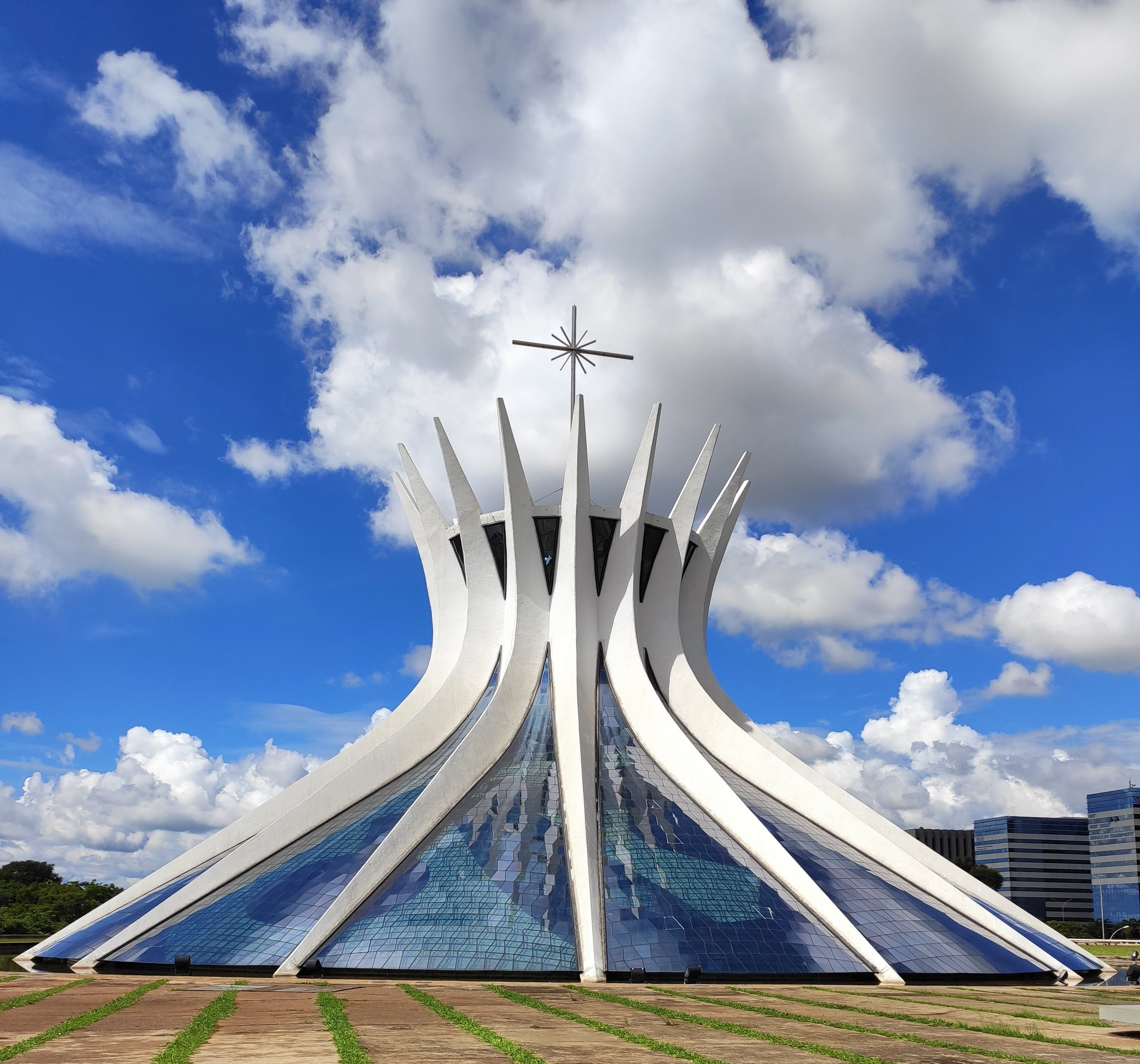
The Cathedral of Brasilia in Brazil takes a modernist form

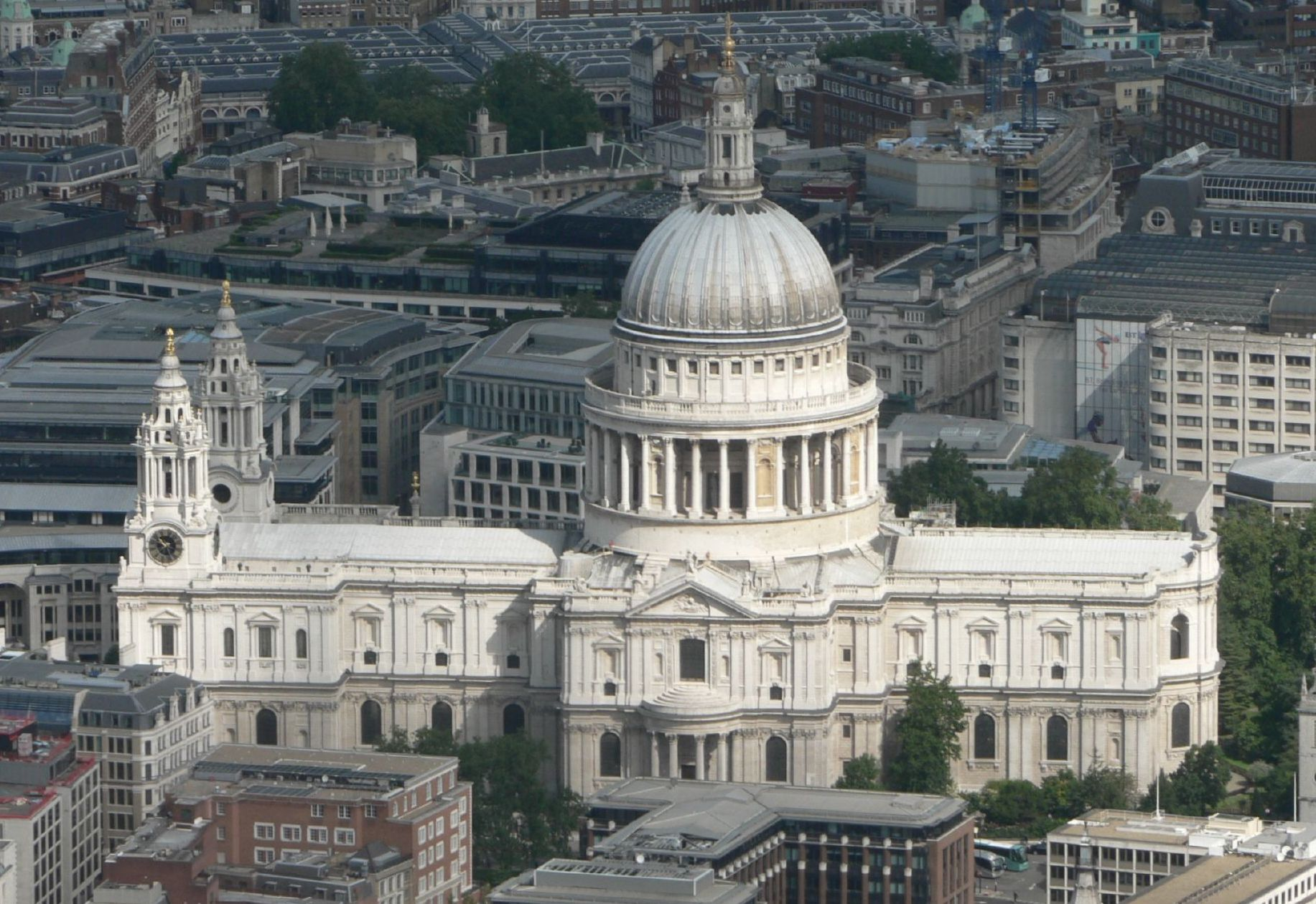
St Paul's Cathedral is a landmark of London

The word cathedral is derived from the French cathédrale, which came from the Latin ecclesia cathedralis and from the cathedra ('seat'), and ultimately from the Ancient Greek καθέδρα (kathédra), 'seat, bench', from κατά (kata) 'down' and ἕδρα (hedra) 'seat, base, chair'.

The word refers to the presence and prominence of the bishop's or archbishop's chair or throne, raised above both clergy and laity, and originally located facing the congregation from behind the high altar. In the ancient world, the chair, on a raised dais, was the distinctive mark of a teacher or rhetor and thus symbolises the bishop's role as teacher. A raised throne within a basilican hall was also definitive for a Late Antique presiding magistrate; and so the cathedra also symbolises the bishop's role in governing his diocese.

The word cathedral, as the seat of a bishop, is found in most languages; however in Europe a cathedral church can be referred to as a duomo (in Italian) or Dom (e.g. German, Dutch, etc.), from the Latin term domus ecclesiae (house of the church) or domus episcopalis (episcopal house). While the terms are not synonymous (a duomo is a collegiate church, similar to the English "minster") many cathedral churches are also collegiate churches, so that duomo, and Dom, have become the common names for a cathedral in those countries. It is also common in parts of the Iberian Peninsula to use Sé (in Portuguese), and Seu (in Catalan, with its Spanish form Seo), all of them from the Latin term episcopalis sedes, meaning "episcopal seat".

In the Eastern Orthodox Church, the Latin word cathedral commonly translates as katholikon (sobor in Slavic languages), meaning 'assembly', but this title is also applied to monastic and other major churches without episcopal responsibilities. When the church at which an archbishop or "metropolitan" presides is specifically intended, the term kathedrikós naós (lit. 'cathedral temple') is used.

The episcopal throne embodies the principle that only a bishop makes a cathedral, and this still applies even in those churches that no longer have bishops, but retain cathedral dignity and functions in ancient churches over which bishops formerly presided. But the throne can also embody the principle that a cathedral makes a bishop; both specifically, in that the bishop is elected within the cathedral and is inaugurated by being enthroned within the cathedral by acclamation of clergy and laity; and also generally, in that the bishops' essential qualifications of regular prayer, higher learning and musical worship were for many centuries, primarily accessible through cathedral functions. In this there is a distinction between those church traditions, predominantly those of Eastern Orthodox Christianity but formerly also including Celtic churches in Ireland, Scotland and Wales, whose bishops came to be made in monasteries; and those church traditions whose bishops have tended predominantly to arise through the ranks of cathedral clergy.

In the Catholic or Roman Catholic tradition, the term cathedral correctly applies only to a church that houses the seat of the bishop of a diocese. The abbey church of a territorial abbey serves the same function (that is, houses the seat of the abbot), but does not acquire the title. In any other jurisdiction canonically equivalent to a diocese but not canonically erected as such (prelature, vicariate, ordinariate, prefecture, apostolic administration), the church that serves this function is correctly called the "principal church" of the respective entity—though some have coopted the term cathedral anyway. The Catholic Church also uses the following terms.

- A pro-cathedral is a parish or other church used temporarily as a cathedral, usually while the cathedral of a diocese is under construction, renovation, or repair. This designation applies only as long as the temporary use continues.
- A co-cathedral is a second cathedral in a diocese that has two sees. This situation can arise in various ways such as a merger of two former dioceses, preparation to split a diocese, or perceived need to perform cathedral functions in a second location due to the expanse of the diocesan territory.
- A proto-cathedral (lit. 'first cathedral') is the former cathedral of a transferred see.

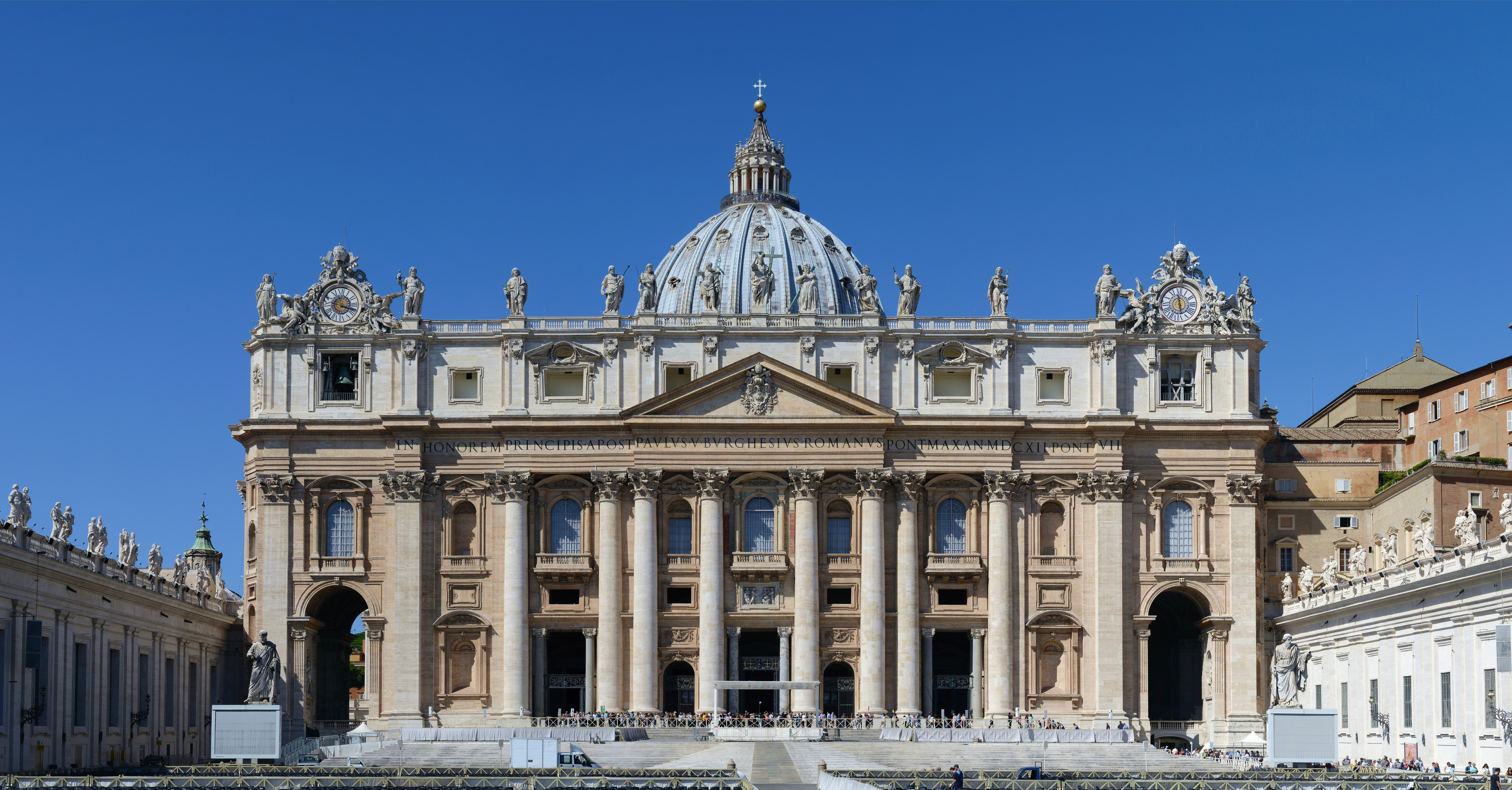
Despite its size and historic importance, St. Peter's Basilica in Rome, the Holy See of the Catholic Church, is not a cathedral.

The cathedral church of a metropolitan bishop is called a metropolitan cathedral.

The term cathedral actually carries no implication as to the size or ornateness of the building, although many cathedrals are impressive edifices simply because diocesan celebrations typically require the capacity of one of the larger churches in the diocese. Thus, the term cathedral is often applied colloquially to large and impressive churches that do not function as cathedrals (e.g. the Arctic Cathedral in Tromsø, Norway). Simon Jenkins' guidebook on European cathedrals intentionally includes several churches that have never been cathedrals (Ulm Minster and the Sagrada Família, a minor basilica in Barcelona) or that were formerly designated so (Westminster Abbey and Basel Minster).

== History and organization of the Early Church ==
=== Origins and characteristics of the first cathedrals in Europe ===
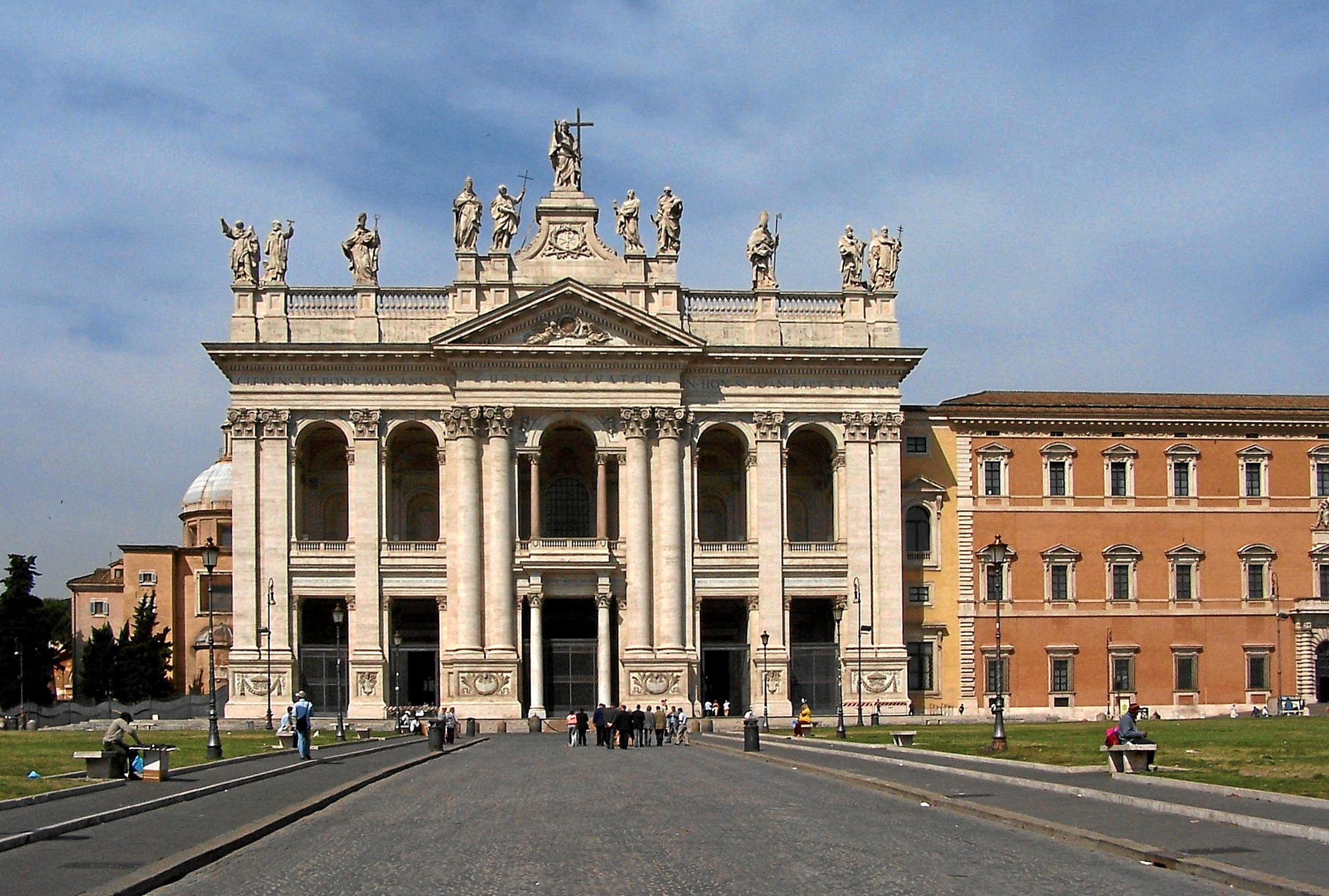
The Patriarchal Archbasilica of Saint John Lateran, Rome.

The history of cathedrals commenced in the year 313, when the emperor Constantine the Great personally adopted Christianity and initiated the Peace of the Church. Indeed, in strict terminology, there could not have been "cathedrals" before that date, as before the 4th century there were no Christian "cathedrae"; bishops were never seated when leading congregational worship, but instead presided standing on a raised platform or pulpitum. In the third century, the phrase "ascending the platform", ad pulpitum venire, becomes the standard term for Christian ordination. During the siege of Dura Europos in 256, a complete Christian house church, or domus ecclesiae was entombed in a defensive bank, surviving when excavated, in places to wall-top height. The Dura church had been converted out of a large urban courtyard house of standard form, in which two rooms had been knocked together to make an assembly hall, capable of holding 60-75 standing; while a tank had been inserted in a room on the opposite side of the courtyard as a baptistery, with rich wall paintings above it. The large room was indeed found to have a raised pulpitum at one end, big enough for one person in turn to read, preach and preside from; but too low to have been surmounted by a throne, and too small to have contained an altar. Otherwise the large room had no decoration or distinctive features at all.

In 269, soon after Dura fell to the Persian army, a body of clerics assembled a charge sheet against the bishop of Antioch, Paul of Samosata, in the form of an open letter. Amongst the accusations was that Paul, who had received the civil rank of ducenarius due to contacts in the imperial court, had improperly erected an enclosure, or secretum, for himself in the church of Antioch; that within this enclosure he had erected a throne from which he presided in worship; and that he had trained a female choir to sing hymns of his own devising. These practices were all condemned as innovations, improperly importing the symbols of his secular Roman magistracy into church ritual; while presumptuously and blasphemously asserting that the person of the bishop in eucharistic worship is seated in the place of Christ himself. Despite this, it would be only a century before all bishops in the Mediterranean world had cathedrals, all sat on thrones within an enclosed sanctuary space, and all had established trained choirs to enhance eucharistic worship.

The driving principle underlying this change was the acceptance by bishops, more or less willingly, of an imperial invitation to adopt and maintain the duties, dignity and insignia proper to a public magistrate. Characteristically a Roman magistrate presided from a raised throne in a large, richly decorated and aisled rectangular hall called a basilica; and now bishops would do the same. The earliest of these new basilican cathedrals of which substantial remains are still visible (and maybe amongst the very earliest to be built) is below the Cathedral of Aquileia on the northern tip of the Adriatic sea. Dated from a mosaic inscription between 313 and 319, the complex consisted of two parallel east–west aisled halls of similar size; with a third smaller north–south cross-hall connecting them, which has been interpreted as the presence hall of the episcopium or bishop's residence. The three halls create an open courtyard, in which was originally located a separate baptistery. Surviving from both large basilican halls are rich mosaic pavements showing (amongst other scenes) Jonah and the Whale, and a series of, mainly female, donor portraits. It appears that similar cathedrals of double-basilica and baptistry were soon afterwards erected in Milan, Trier and Pavia; but that subsequently single-basilican churches became the more common cathedral model.

Constantine's declaration of imperial favour towards Christianity transformed all aspects of Christian life in the Roman Empire. From being a minority religion, largely confined to urban areas and restricted social groupings, and subject to official hostility and occasional persecution; Christianity acquired greatly expanded numbers of potential adherents of all classes, initially still within city areas, but eventually extending out to the pagus, the city's rural hinterland. The consequence was a radical expansion in the buildings, funding and personnel of associated Church establishments throughout the 4th century. The first cathedrals represent this expansion in material form.

==== Buildings ====
The location and layout of the first cathedrals varied substantially from city to city, although most, as at Aquileia, tended to be sited within the city walls but away from the urban centre; certain elements are almost always found.

==== Basilicas ====
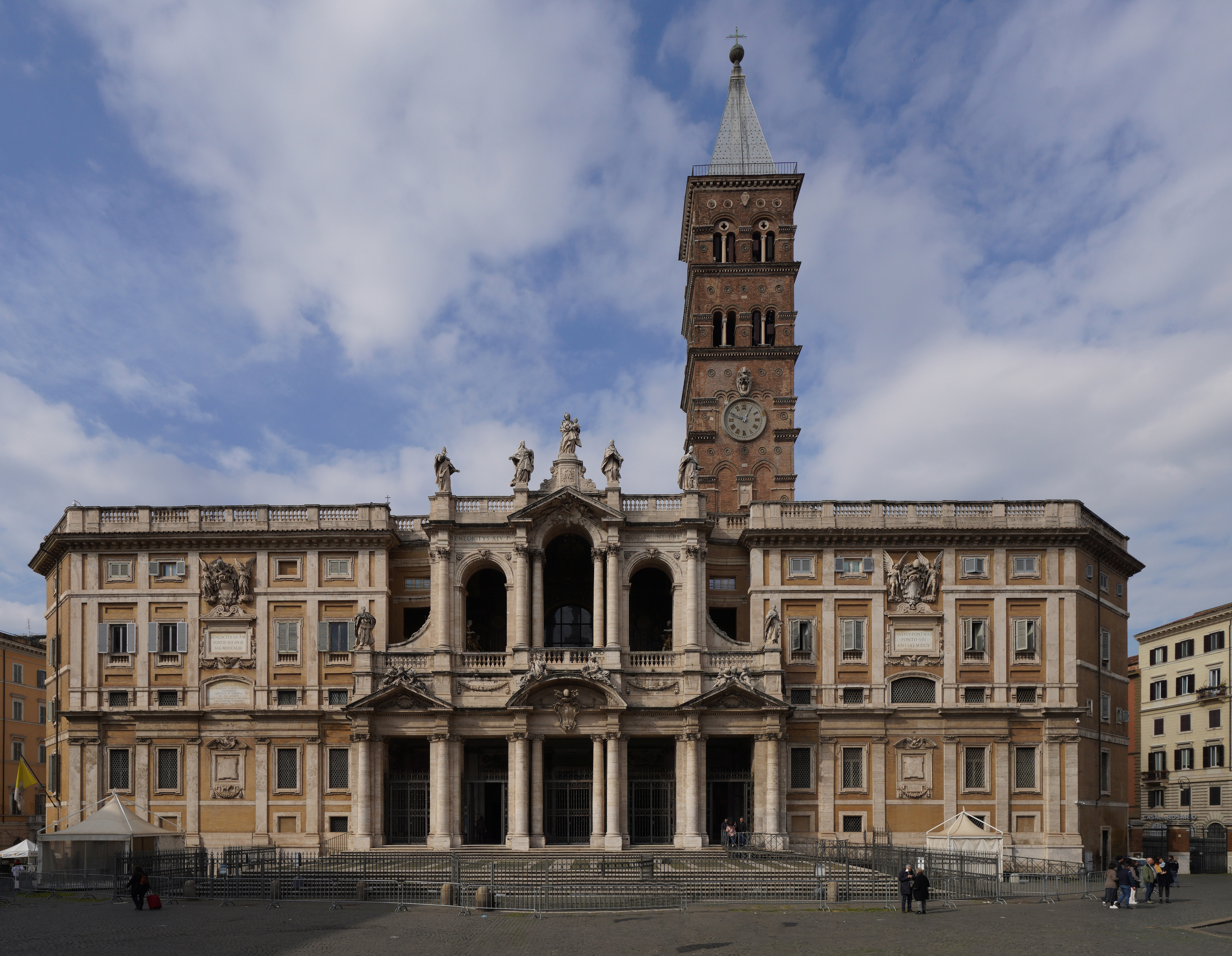
The Basilica of Saint Mary Major, Rome

Basilican halls had previously been characteristic of major civic complexes and military headquarters buildings; but now became the standard structure for accommodating large Christian congregations. From now on, the term basilica denotes any substantial church building. These new basilicas were wholly different in scale from earlier Christian assembly halls, as they were also different in form from any Roman non-Christian temple or religious structure. The halls were longitudinal, aisled, and flooded with light from large clerestory windows. Floors and walls were richly decorated with mosaic and inlay – usually in abstract or floral patterns. The two original double basilicas at Aquileia had both been about 37m by 17m in size, but within 30 years one hall was quadrupled to 73m by 31m. This expanded basilica now demonstrated three additional features that became characteristic of early cathedrals: an enclosure at the eastern end of the church surrounding the altar; a synthronos east of the altar facing west, and consisting of a raised dais with a centrally placed bishop's throne and benches on either side for the clergy of his familia; and a partitioned-off narthex at the western end into which catechumens would withdraw during the central act of the Eucharistic liturgy.

==== Baptisteries ====
The baptistery in the Dura church was about 1m square and 1m deep; baptismal candidates could stand in it, but could not be immersed. In the new cathedrals, as had been the case before, only bishops baptised; and ceremonies were held not more than twice a year to allow for suitable periods of instruction. So baptisteries needed to be greatly increased in size, with associated accommodation to ensure privacy in undressing, anointing and redressing; and the baptismal tank, commonly octagonal, was now fully deep enough for total immersion, and wide enough to accommodate both the candidate and an assisting male or female deacon. Baptisteries commonly adopted centralised plan forms derived from funerary chapels; and are invariably separate from the congregational basilica.

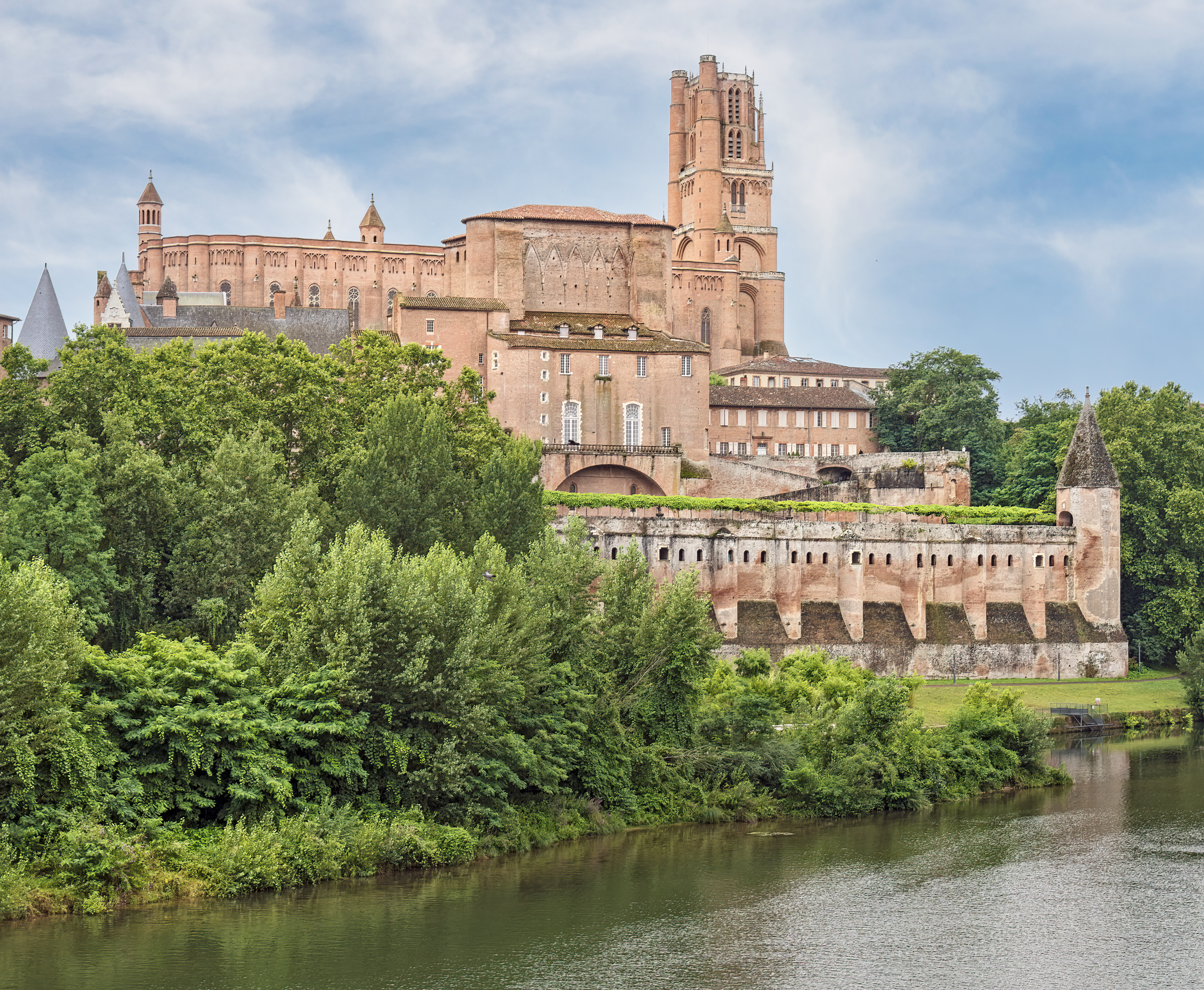
The Palais de la Berbie, an episcopal palace in Albi, France

==== Episcopium ====
No one lived in the house church at Dura; such residential facilities as the latrine and kitchen were removed in the conversion. But cathedral complexes always included an episcopal residence. Prominent amongst the charges that had been directed against Paul of Samosata had been his alleged over-familiarity with pious women. As was common, Paul had been married when elected bishop; and again, as was universally expected for a bishop, he had then ceased sexual contact with his wife and no longer cohabited with her. But his accusers charged that, by continuing to associate with other women (even without any indication of actual impropriety) he was creating an unacceptable potential for scandal. To avoid similar such occasions arising, it was necessary for the new cathedrals to create male-only living quarters for the bishop and his entire establishment; and since, in churches in the West, all presbyters and deacons were also expected to live apart from their wives after ordination, these living quarters, the episcopium, were necessarily substantial in extent. In addition to eating and sleeping quarters for ordained boys and men, the episcopium also commonly provided private dining halls for the hospitality expected of the bishop's enhanced social status, a private oratory or chapel for the bishop, and often a bath house.

=== Finances ===
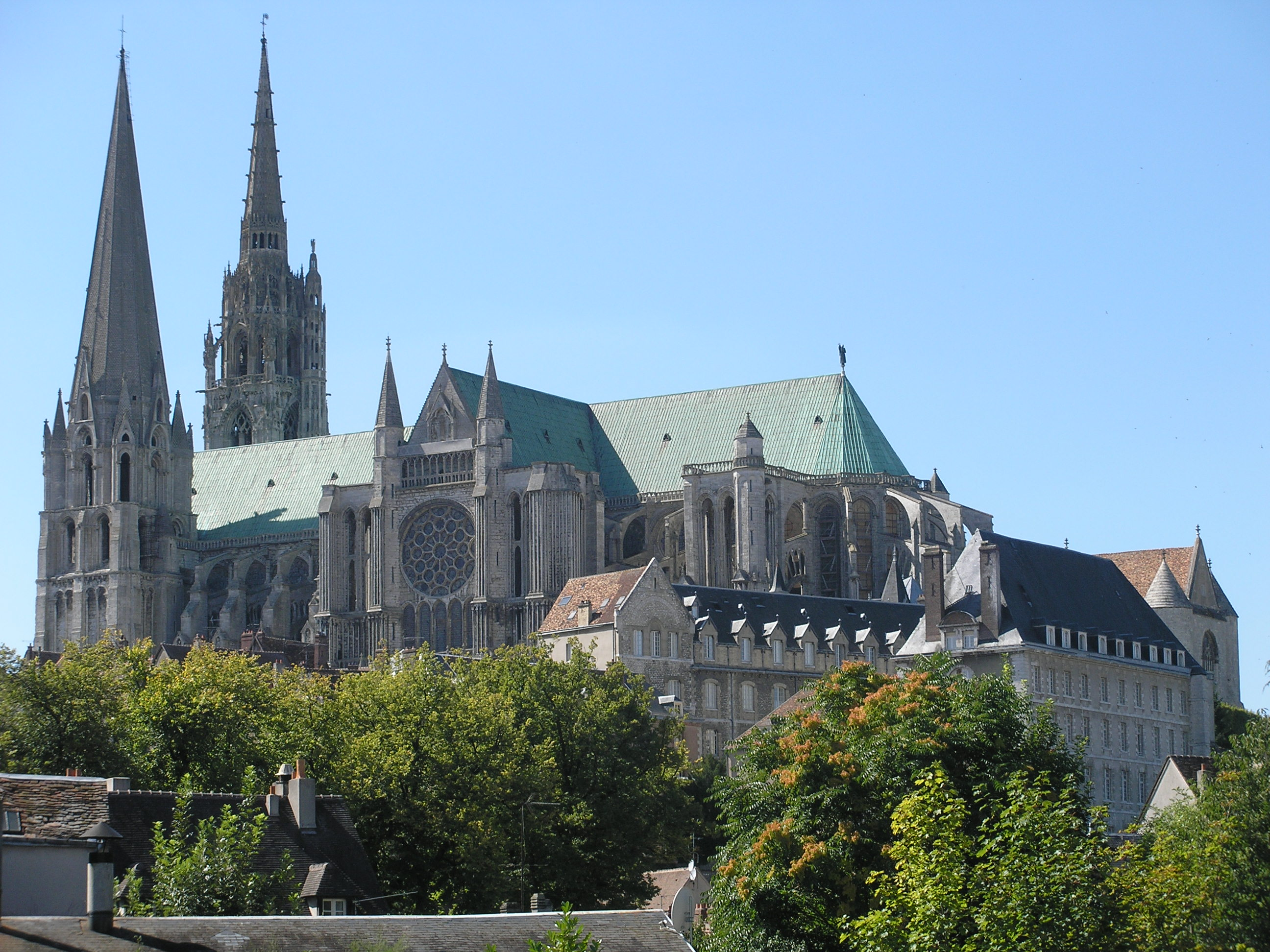
Chartres Cathedral, France, a famous landmark that draws both pilgrims and art lovers.

Just as the episcopal residence was integral within the complex of cathedral buildings, so too there was no distinction between episcopal, diocesan and cathedral property and endowments. In principle, all diocesan income was paid into a common fund, and divided into four fixed shares for each main area of expenditure; the Bishop himself; the cathedral clergy; the fabric and lighting of cathedral and city churches; and charitable donations. Many diocese already held substantial endowments, but income increased enormously with the Peace of the Church; partly due to imperial subsidies in kind, but mainly from private bequests and regular private benefactions (often called 'first fruits'); although at this date, tithe was never paid to the church. In addition, many individual landowners supported private chapels and oratories on their own property; and endowed independent charitable institutions, and eventually monasteries and nunneries too.

==== Bishop's share ====
Augustine of Hippo estimated his personal income as being 20 times that of his father, a minor civil servant; and Augustine was by no means the wealthiest bishop in North Africa. But in accepting from Constantine the status of civil magistrates, bishops were now also committed to substantial expenditure to maintain their new style and status; and also to fulfil the associated duties, for instance in employing qualified legal assessors to support them when sitting as civil judges.

==== Clergy share ====
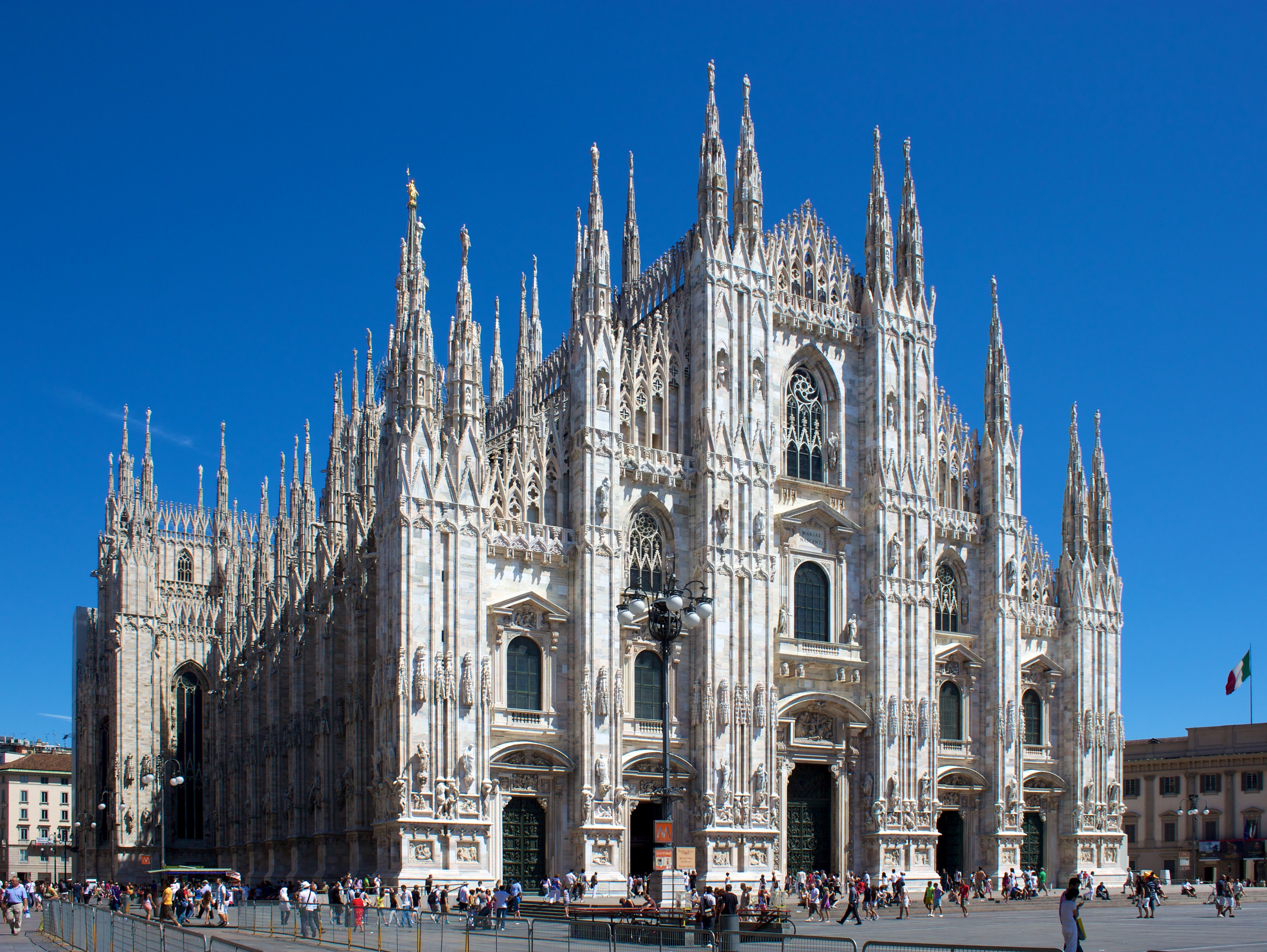
The Milan Cathedral is a Gothic style cathedral in Italy

All ordained clerics attached to the cathedral were paid through stipends from the general fund. This applied both to the clergy working directly within the cathedral itself, and also to the clergy, called canonici attached to churches founded by the bishop within the city. From the end of the 4th century, as the mission of the church extended more into rural areas, 'baptistery churches' were founded in more distant villages, so that rural populations could receive the bishop's baptism locally; and the clergy in these churches also counted as canonici and drew a regular stipend.

==== Fabric share ====
Plentiful donor inscriptions show that most new church building programmes; mosaics, roofs, furnishings, were financed by private donations. The costs of maintenance and lighting, however, fell on the general fund. This also applied to the churches, known as tituli, served directly by the bishop's clergy, generally also including any surviving house churches from the period before the Peace of the Church and the rural baptistery churches; but not to the chapels, called parochiae, established by rural landowners for the convenience of their tenants. The bishop, in respect of his civil status, was expected to contribute to public works of general benefit; aqueducts, bridges, watercourses.

==== Charitable share ====
In all cities, bishops dedicated substantial sums to the support of widows, orphans and the poor. Such donations had been a strong feature of the church in earlier centuries, but tended then to be specifically directed to the Christian needy. Now the charitable compass became general. Bishops were especially expected to take responsibility for raising ransom funds, where local persons had fallen captive. In addition, it was expected that each diocese would support a xenodochium, a hostel for the homeless and strangers.

=== Personnel ===
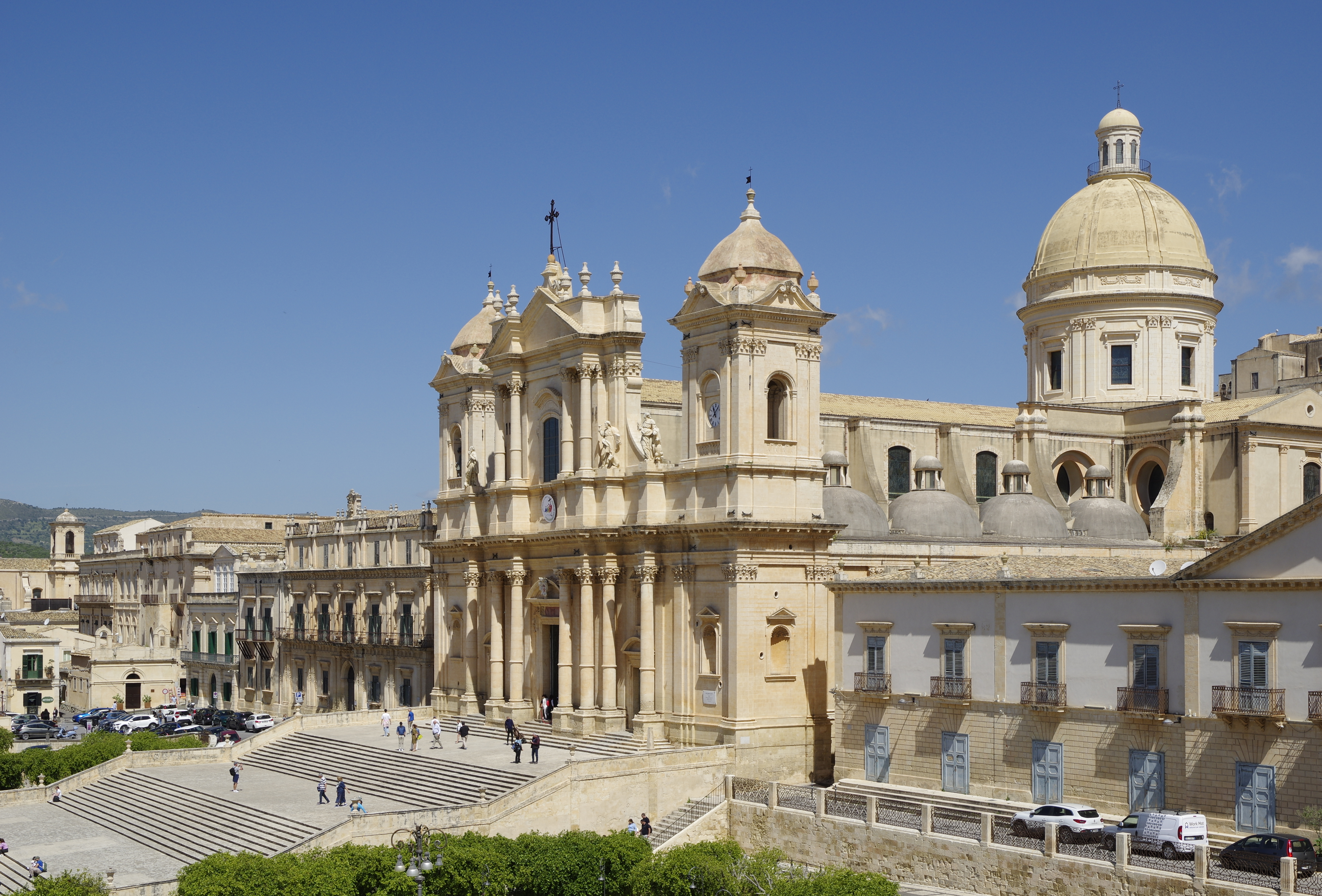
Noto Cathedral, Sicily, Italy

Just as the status of the bishop was transformed at the Peace of the Church; so too was that of the male clergy. With the bishop now resident in the episcopium the other male clergy came to be recognised as his formal familia, in mark of which male clergy now received the tonsure by shaving of their heads; this being originally a Roman badge of adoption. The early church had recognised the orders of bishop, presbyter (priest) and deacon, but a range of minor orders had since grown up in addition; and all were tonsured. These orders now tended to be understood as clerical 'ranks', equivalent to those in the military, such that the male clergy are now often referred to as a "clerical militia". And as in the Roman military or civil service, promotion was expected to follow the principle of cursus honorum, rising through the ranks, with the expectation that ideally, a minimum period would be served in each. The female orders of virgin, widow and (female) deacon remained explicitly outside the bishop's familia; and so they did not receive the tonsure and nor did they progress through the cursus honorum. But all orders of cathedral clergy, male and female, increased dramatically in numbers. Around 540 Justinian ordered that the clerical payroll of Hagia Sophia be strictly limited to 60 presbyters, 100 male deacons, 90 subdeacons, 110 lectors, 25 singers, 100 doorkeepers and 40 female deacons; 525 in all.

==== Bishops ====
Bishops were at the head of the local church; but not explicitly within the cursus honorum, as appointment was by election from the local clergy and people. The clergy tended to favour appointment of bishops from within the ranks of cathedral presbyters; but local lay choice often tended rather to outsiders, either a spectacular holy man, hermit or ascetic; or otherwise a senior civil servant or diplomat, who might have favourable contacts to exploit at court. But most bishops came from the curial class, that is those holding the hereditary rank of decurion with the obligation to serve on the city council, as only persons of this class and above would be likely to have a full rhetorical education in Greek and Latin grammar; without which it was not possible for a boy raised with a knowledge only of Late Antique vernacular speech to express himself in approved classical linguistic forms.

==== Priests and archpriests ====
It was expected that the normal president at both the Eucharist and Baptism would be the bishop, who would celebrate in the cathedral and in titular churches in turn. However, in practice, the bishop needed deputies for the Eucharist and also for the Divine Office of daily prayer, and this duty fell to the priests. The bishop selected a senior priest as archpriest who acted as his official deputy in all ritual matters and as head of the familia. The archpriest was also responsible for the cathedral school. After the 5th century, there were no longer state-supported secular teachers of rhetoric and grammar in the West (other than in parts of Italy) and so the church would have to educate its own.

==== Deacons, subdeacons and archdeacons ====
Just as the presbyters deputised for the bishop in ritual matters, so the deacons deputised in administrative and financial matters, especially in the raising and delivering of charity. At the head of the diaconate was the archdeacon; the bishop's main deputy in managerial affairs. Originally inferior in rank to the archpriest, the archdeacon by the sixth century had established clear pre-eminence. Subdeacons assisted the deacons, but unlike them were allowed to marry after ordination; consequently many clerics stopped the cursus honorum at this point, and it was not unusual for a subdeacon to be elected bishop; and even Pope.

==== Doorkeepers, exorcists, lectors, acolytes and primicerius ====
In practice, the first three of these orders tended to be given together, and were typically applied to boys as young as seven. These boy lectors were too young for the grammar school, but were valued as choristers, and so were included in the Schola Cantorum or choir school. Originally under the responsibility of the deacons, the organisation of choirs was reformed by Pope Gregory the Great, who introduced the office of primicerius or head cantor for this purpose. This proved a vital reform; as without any comprehensive system of musical notation, the only way that sacred music could be maintained and passed on was through professional choirs of sound musical training undertaking cathedral worship – and such skills are not guaranteed to be present in high-ranking ecclesiastics.

==== Women's orders: virgins, widows and deaconesses ====
These orders had been of considerable importance in earlier centuries; but tended to be sidelined in cathedrals from the 4th century onwards. So long as adult baptism continued as a regular occurrence, female deacons would continue to be needed for that service; but otherwise the main factor maintaining these orders was a knock-on effect from the rule of continence applied to bishops, presbyters and deacons. When a man became ordained, and moved into the episcopium with the rest of the bishop's familia; then there would usually also be a requirement for support to their mothers, wives and daughters; and the orders of widows and virgins respectively continued largely for this purpose.

=== Functions ===
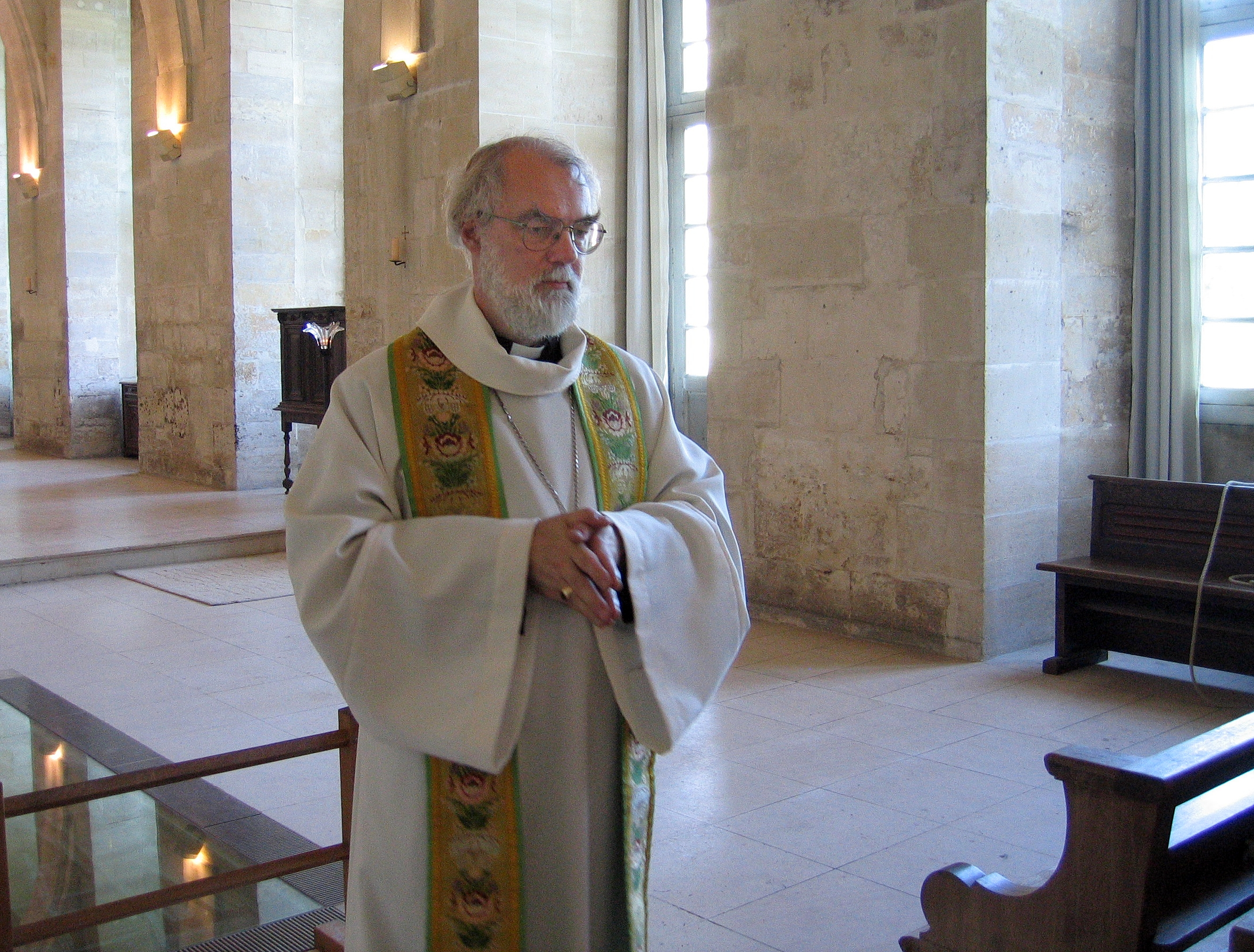
Former archbishop of Canterbury, Rowan Williams.

Notwithstanding wide differences over time in institutional structures and wider historical contexts; the key functions established for the first cathedrals have tended to remain as distinctive cathedral functions down the centuries; a regular cycle of choral prayer; providing a forum for civic leadership; a commitment to higher learning; and the promotion and dissemination of music.

== Cathedral churches since 800 AD ==
=== Rule of the clergy ===
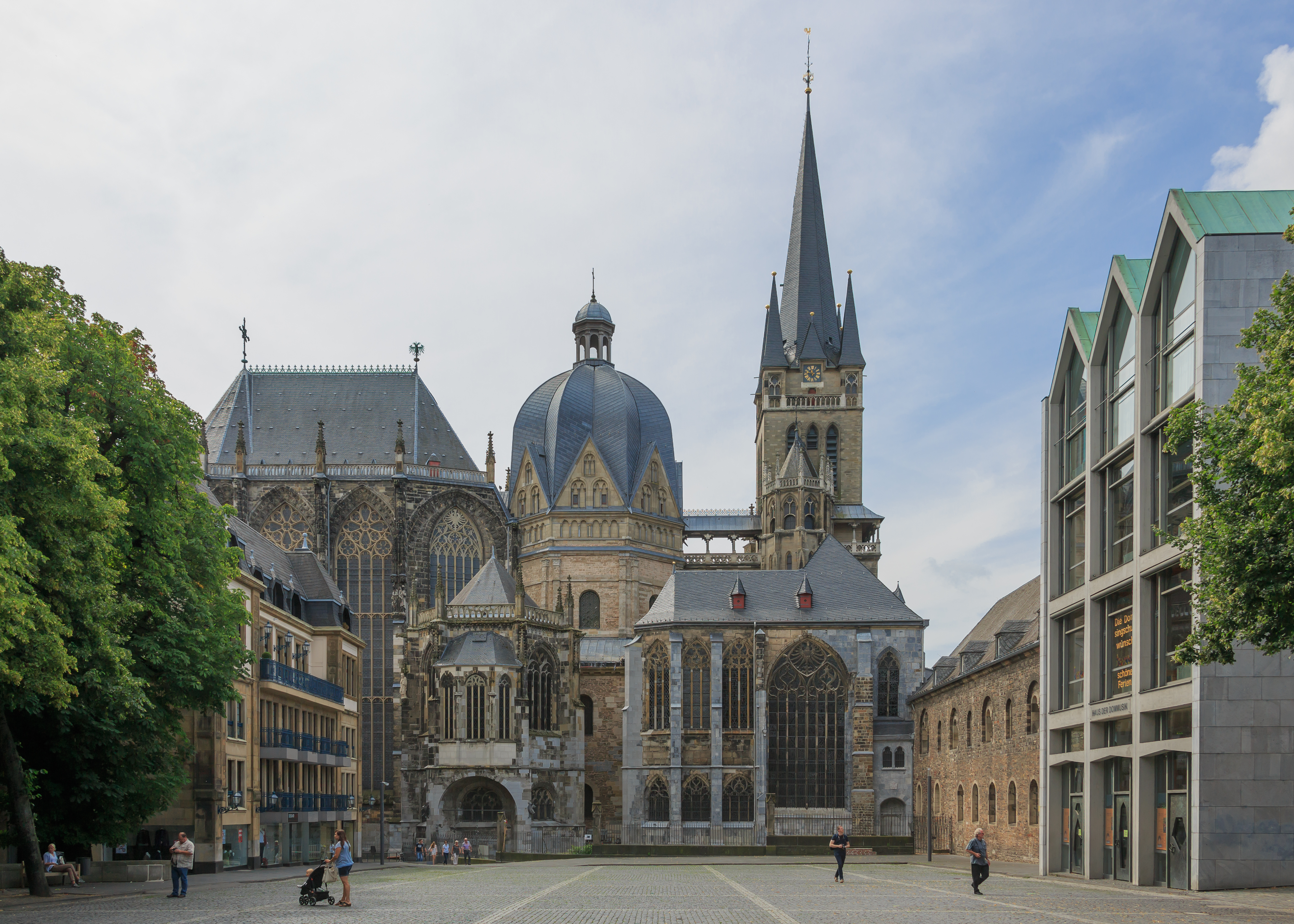
Aachen Cathedral, Germany, founded by Charlemagne in 800 AD, coronation place of the Holy Roman Emperor.

==== Early Middle Ages: religious communities ====
The history of the body of clergy attached to the cathedral church is obscure, and in each case local considerations affected its development, however the main features were more or less common to all.

Originally the bishop and cathedral clergy formed a kind of religious community, which, while not in the true sense a monastery, was nevertheless often called a monasterium, the word not having the restricted meaning that it afterwards acquired. In this lies the reason for the apparent anomaly that churches like York Minster and Lincoln Cathedral, which never had any monks attached to them, have inherited the name of minster or monastery. In these early communities the clergy often lived apart in their own dwellings, and were not infrequently married.

In the 8th century Chrodegang, Bishop of Metz (743–766), compiled a code of rules for the clergy of the cathedral churches, which, though widely accepted in Germany and other parts of the continent, gained little acceptance in England.

According to Chrodegang's rule, the cathedral clergy were to live under a common roof, occupy a common dormitory and submit to the authority of a special officer. The rule of Chrodegang was, in fact, a modification of the Benedictine rule. Gisa, a native of Lorraine, who was bishop of Wells from 1061 to 1088, introduced it into England, and imposed its observance on the clergy of his cathedral church, but it was not followed for long there, or elsewhere in England.

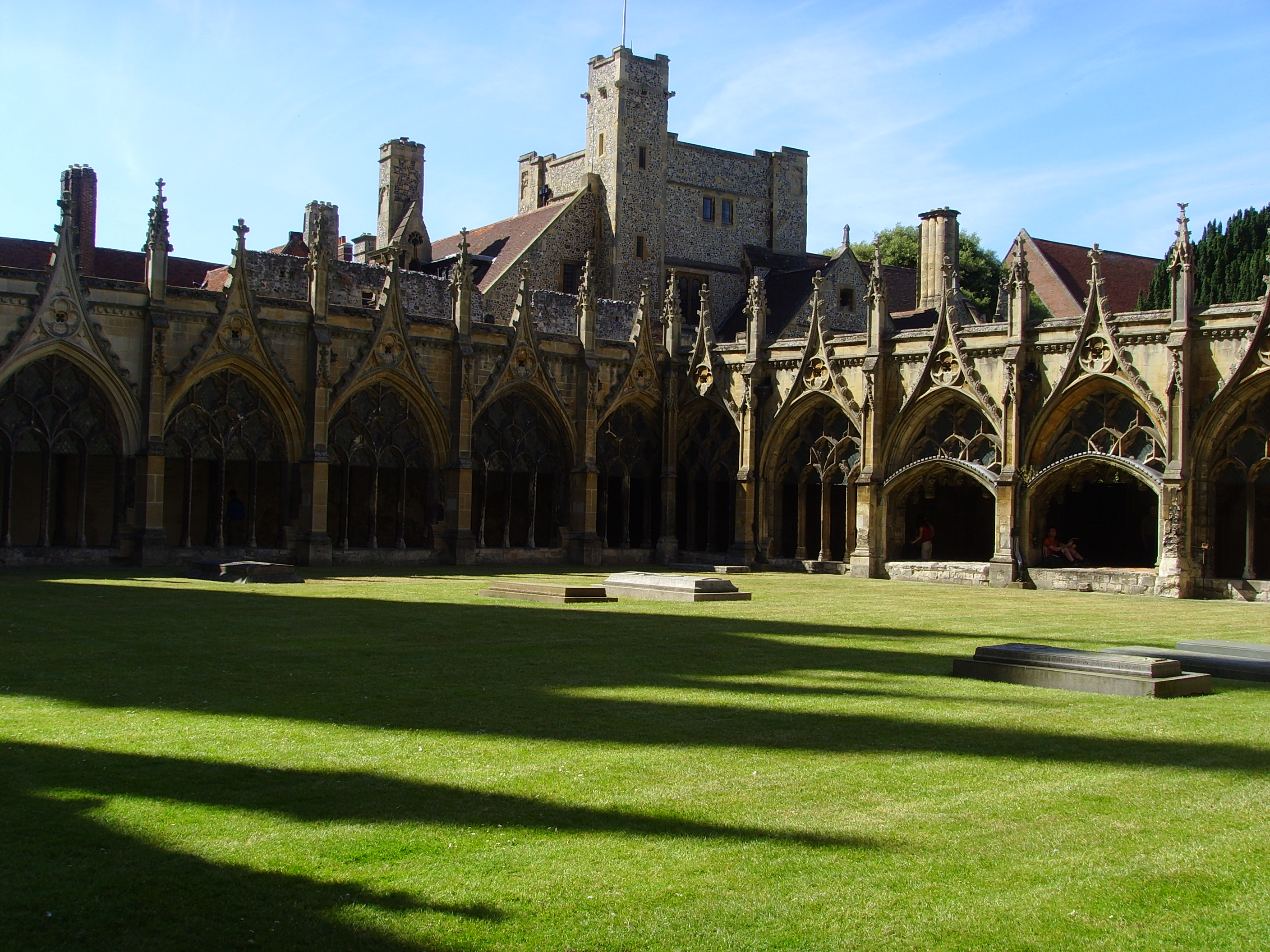
The cloister of Canterbury Cathedral with monastic buildings beyond

==== Late Middle Ages: monastic and secular cathedrals ====
During the 10th and 11th centuries, the cathedral clergy became more definitely organised and were divided into two classes. One was that of a monastic establishment of some recognised order of monks, often the Benedictines, while the other class was that of a college of clergy, bound by no vows except those of their ordination, but governed by a code of statutes or canons: hence the name of "canon". In this way arose the distinction between the monastic and secular cathedral churches. Outside Great Britain, monastic cathedrals are known only at Monreale in Sicily and Downpatrick in Ireland.

In the case of monastic cathedral churches, the internal government was that of the religious order to which the chapter belonged and all the members kept perpetual residence.

The alternative of this was the cathedral ruled by a secular chapter; the dignities of provost, dean, precentor, chancellor, treasurer, etc., came into being for the regulation and good order of the church and its services, while the non-residence of the canons, rather than their perpetual residence, became the rule, and led to their duties being performed by a body of "vicars", who officiated for them at the services of the church.

=== Reformation ===
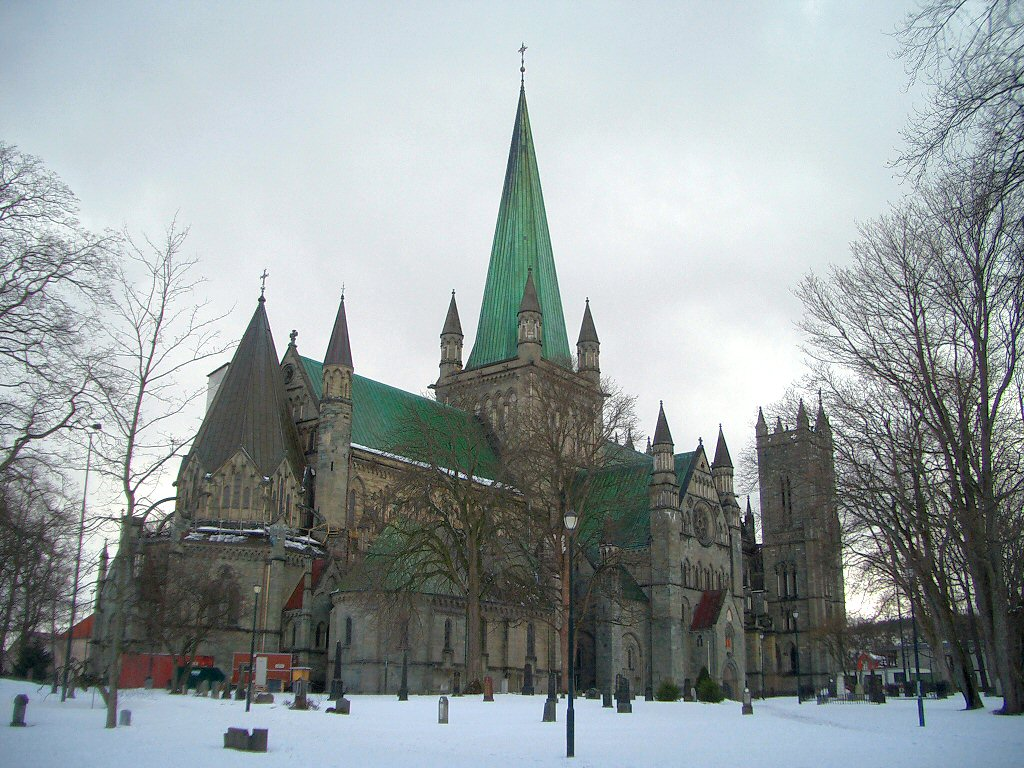
Nidaros Cathedral, Norway, became Lutheran at the Reformation

Prior to the Reformation all cathedrals of Western Europe were of the Roman Catholic Church. In England, much of the structure of the monastic and cathedral system was reconstituted during the English Reformation. Although the cathedrals were retained by the now independent and established Church of England, the monastic cathedral chapters were dissolved by King Henry VIII and, with the exceptions of Bath and Coventry, were refounded by him as chapters of canons with a dean as the head and other clergy as minor canons.

In Germany and other parts of Europe, with the spread of the Lutheran Church, some ancient churches, like Nidaros Cathedral, Norway, and Lübeck Cathedral, Germany, became the seats of Protestant bishops, as in England. Many new churches were built which serve the regional administrative function of a cathedral. However, not all churches that function as the seat of a bishop are known as "cathedral", the custom varying from place to place, according to local tradition. Some are simply designated "church", as occurs at Budolfi Church, the Lutheran cathedral of Aalborg in Denmark.

=== Roles ===
==== Provosts ====
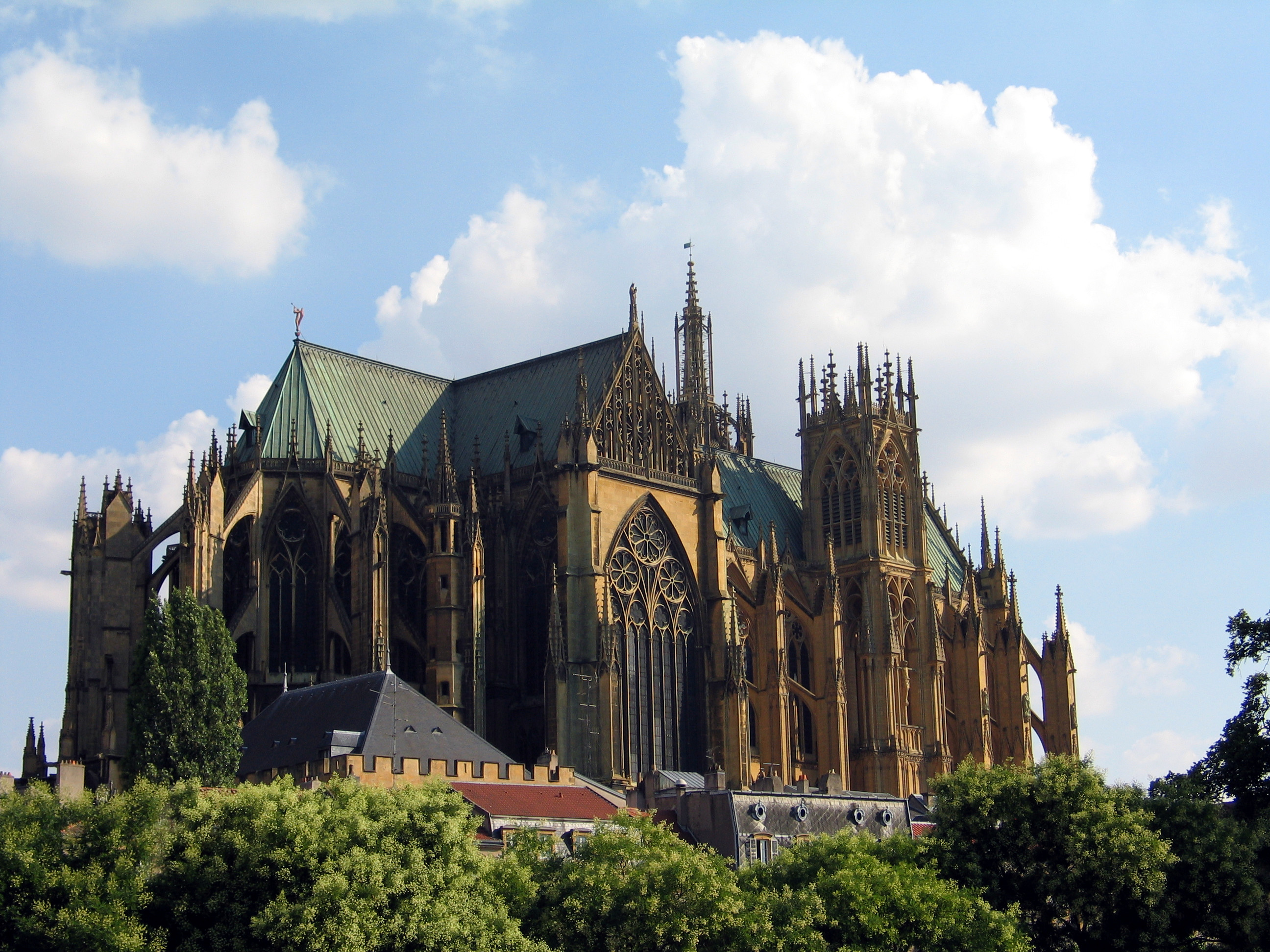
Metz Cathedral, France, was governed by a provost.

In most of Europe, the earliest head of a secular church seems to have been the provost (praepositus, probst, etc.), who was charged not only with the internal regulation of the church and oversight of the members of the chapter and control of the services, but was also the steward or seneschal of the lands and possessions of the church. The latter often mainly engaged his attention, to the neglect of his domestic and ecclesiastical duties, and complaints were soon raised that the provost was too much mixed in worldly affairs, and was too frequently absent from his spiritual duties.

This led, in many cases, to the institution of a new officer called the "dean", who had charge of that portion of the provost's duties that related to the internal discipline of the chapter and the services of the church.

In some cases, the office of provost was abolished, but in others it was continued: the provost, who was occasionally an archdeacon as well, remaining head of the chapter. This arrangement was most commonly followed in Germany. In England the provost was almost unknown. Bishop Gisa introduced a provost as head of the chapter of Wells Cathedral, but the office was afterwards subordinated to the other dignities and the provost became simply the steward of certain of the prebendal lands. The provost of the collegiate church of Beverley Minster was the most notable instance of such an officer in England, but at Beverley he was an external officer with authority in the government of the church, no stall in the choir and no vote in chapter.

In Germany and Scandinavia, and in a few of the cathedral churches in the south of France, the provost was the ordinary head of the cathedral chapter, but the office was not common elsewhere. As regards France, of 136 cathedral churches existing at the Revolution, 38 only, and those either on the borders of Germany or in the extreme south, had a provost as the head of the chapter. In others the provost existed as a subordinate officer. There were two provosts at Autun, and Lyon and Chartres had four each, all as subordinate officers.

=== Secular chapter ===
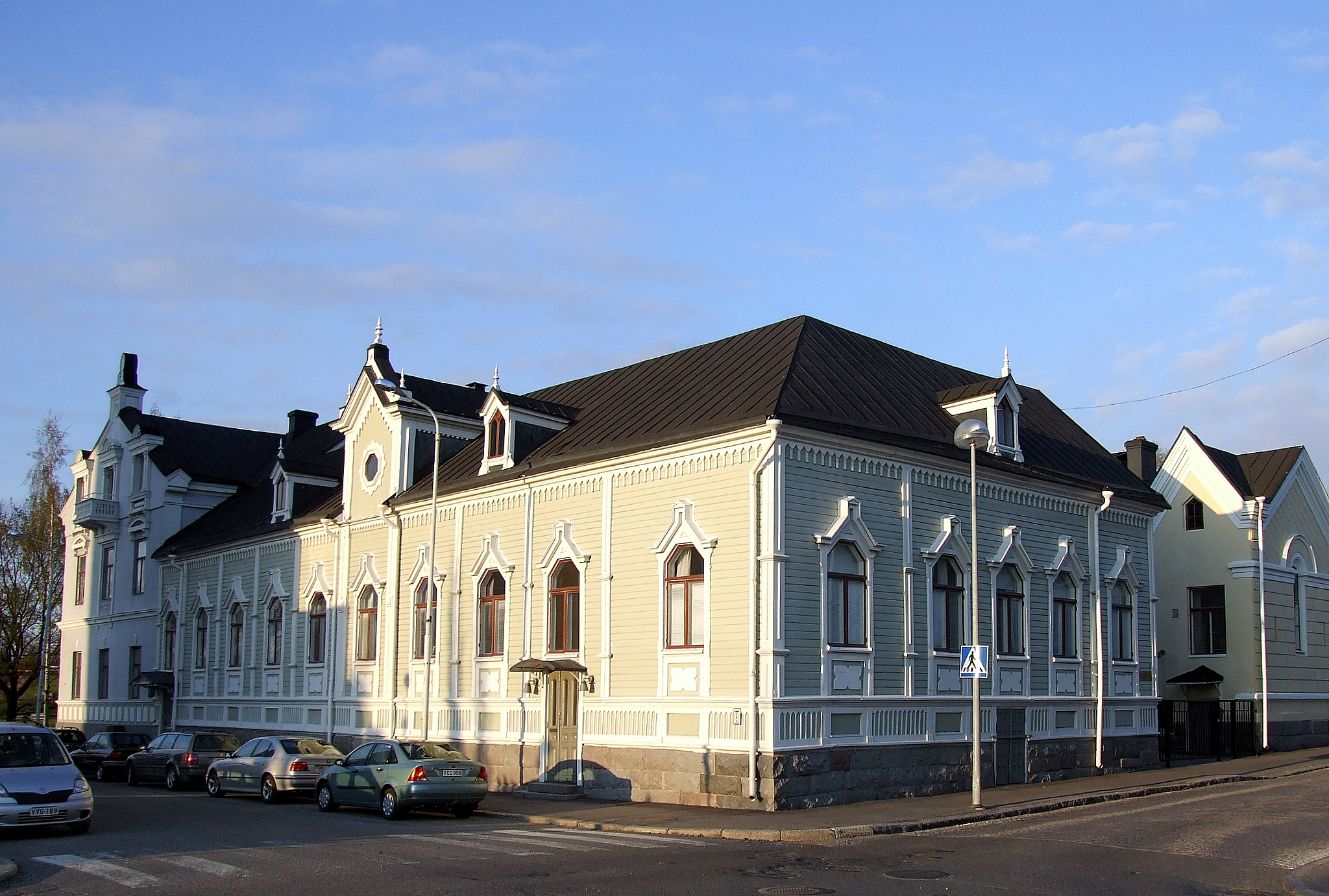
Chapter House of Oulu Cathedral, Finland

The normal constitution of the chapter of a secular cathedral church comprised four dignitaries (there might be more), in addition to the canons. These are the dean, the precentor, the chancellor and the treasurer. These four dignitaries, occupying the four corner stalls in the choir, are called in many of the statutes the quatuor majores personae of the church.

==== Deans ====
The role of dean (from decanus) seems to have derived its designation from the Benedictine "dean" who had ten monks under his charge. The role of dean came into existence to supply the place of the provost in the internal management of the church and chapter. In England every secular cathedral church was headed by a dean who was originally elected by the chapter and confirmed in office by the bishop. The dean is president of the chapter, and within the cathedral has charge of the performance of the services, taking specified portions of them by statute on the principal festivals. The dean sits in the chief stall in the choir, which is usually at the west end of the south side.

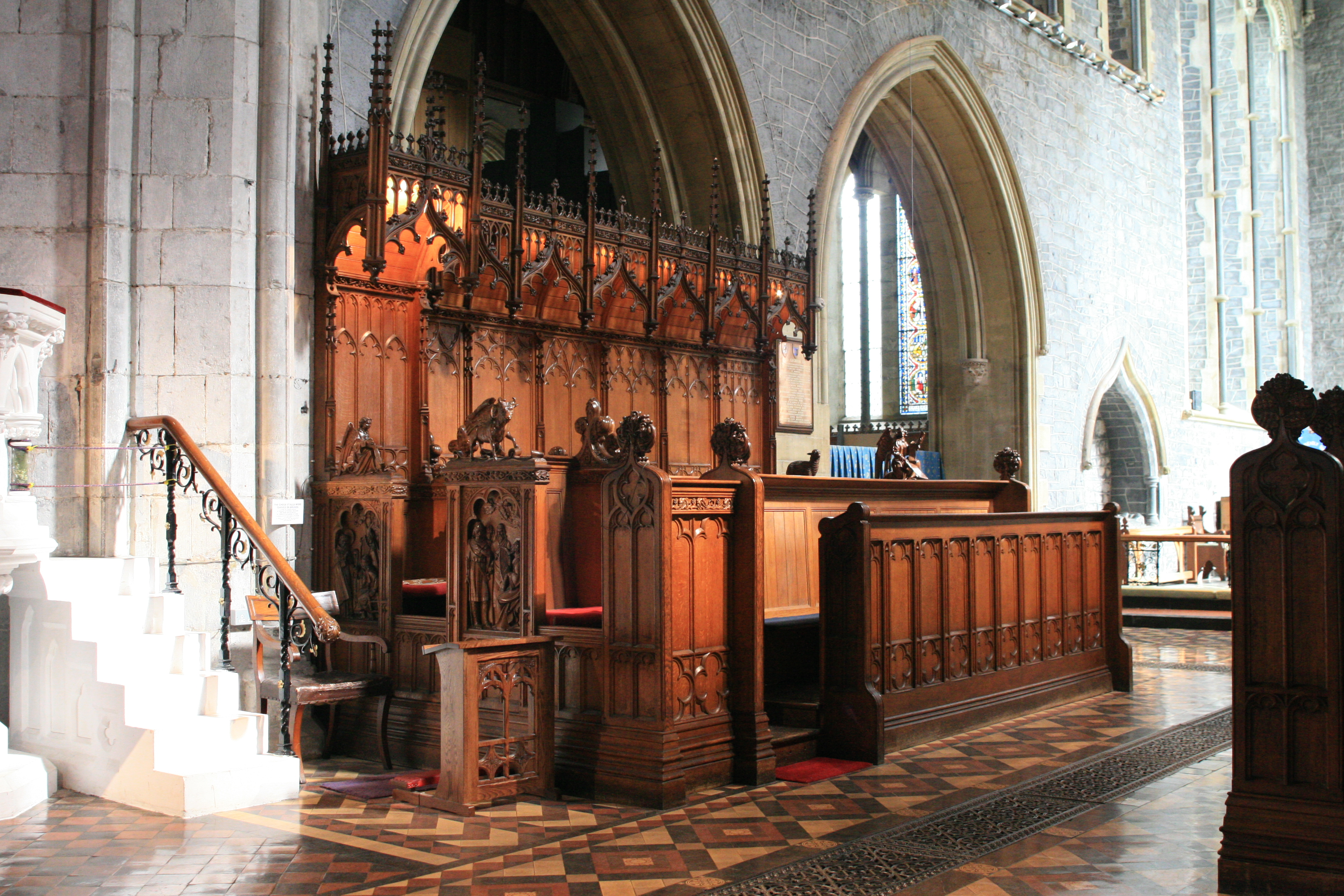
The stalls of St. Canice's Cathedral, Kilkenny, Ireland, showing the bishop's throne and precentor's stall.

==== Precentors ====
Next to the dean (as a rule) is the precentor (primicerius, cantor, etc.), whose special duty is that of regulating the musical portion of the services. The precentor presides in the dean's absence, and occupies the corresponding stall on the north side, although there are exceptions to this rule, where, as at St Paul's, the archdeacon of the cathedral city ranks second and occupies what is usually the precentor's stall.

==== Chancellors ====
The third dignitary is the chancellor (scholasticus, écoldtre, capiscol, magistral, etc.), who must not be confounded with the chancellor of the diocese. The chancellor of the cathedral church is charged with the oversight of its schools, ought to read divinity lectures, and superintend the lections in the choir and correct slovenly readers. The chancellor is often the secretary and librarian of the chapter. In the absence of the dean and precentor, the chancellor is president of the chapter, and within the cathedral is usually assigned the easternmost stall, on the dean's side of the choir.

==== Treasurers ====
The fourth dignitary is the treasurer (custo, sacrisla, cheficier) who is guardian of the fabric, and of all the furniture and ornaments of the church, and whose duty was to provide bread and wine for the Eucharist, and candles and incense. The treasurer also regulated such matters as the ringing of the bells. The treasurer's stall is opposite to that of the chancellor.

==== Other clergy ====
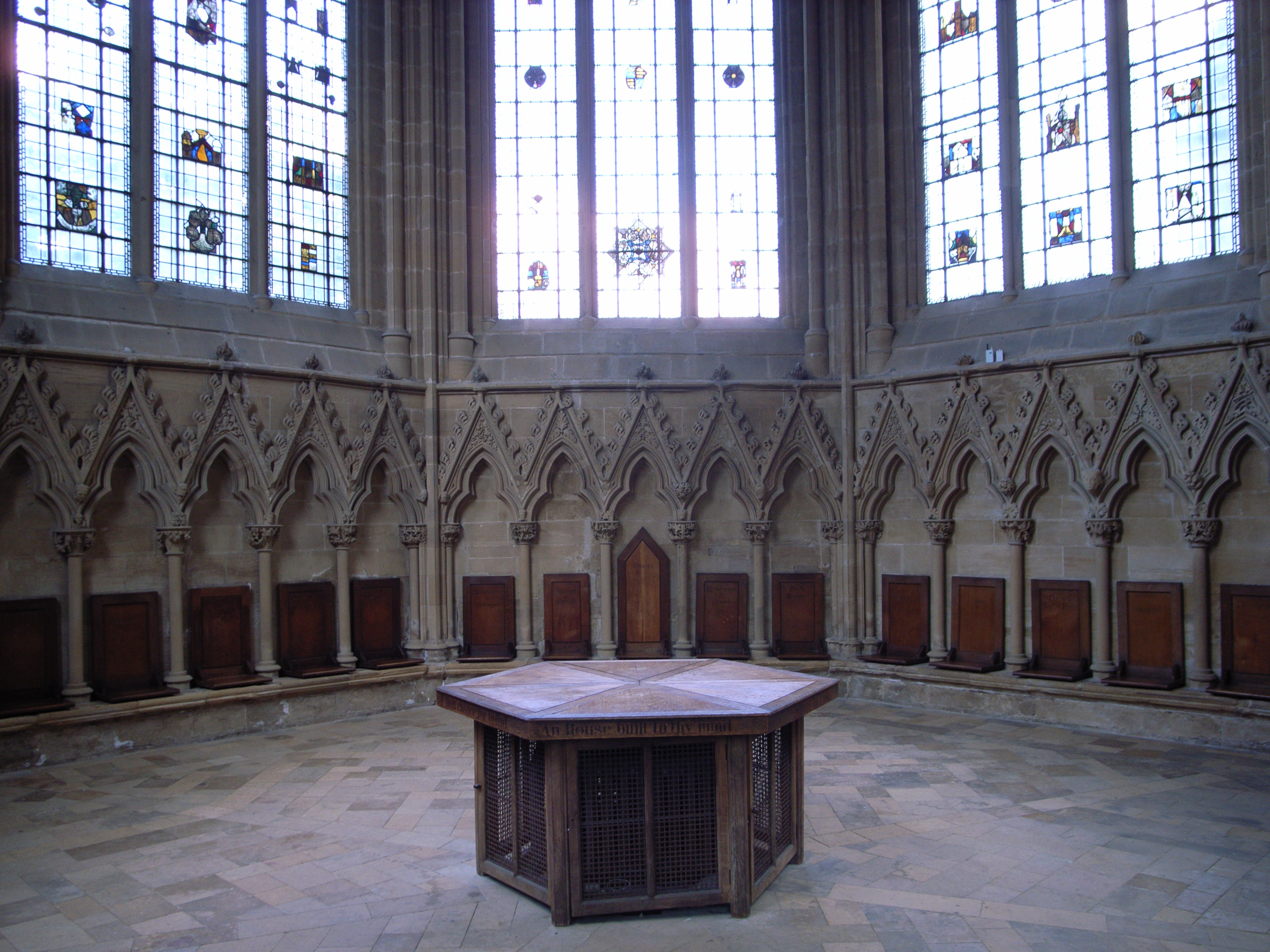
Interior of the Chapter House at Southwell Cathedral, England.

In many cathedral churches are additional dignitaries, as the praelector, subdean, vice-chancellor, succentor-canonicorum, and others, whose roles came into existence to supply the places of the other absent dignitaries, for non-residence was the fatal blot of the secular churches, and in this they contrasted very badly with the monastic churches, where all the members were in continuous residence. Besides the dignitaries there were the ordinary canons, each of whom, as a rule, held a separate prebend or endowment, besides receiving his share of the common funds of the church.

For the most part the canons also speedily became non-resident, and this led to the distinction of residentiary and non-residentiary canons, until in most churches the number of resident canons became definitely limited in number, and the non-residentiary canons, who no longer shared in the common funds, became generally known as prebendaries only, although by their non-residence they did not forfeit their position as canons, and retained their votes in chapter like the others.

This system of non-residence led also to the institution of vicars choral, each canon having his own vicar, who sat in his stall in his absence, and when the canon was present, in the stall immediately below, on the second form. The vicars had no place or vote in chapter, and, though irremovable except for offences, were the servants of their absent canons whose stalls they occupied, and whose duties they performed. Outside Britain they were often called demi-prebendaries. As time went on the vicars were themselves often incorporated as a kind of lesser chapter, or college, under the supervision of the dean and chapter.

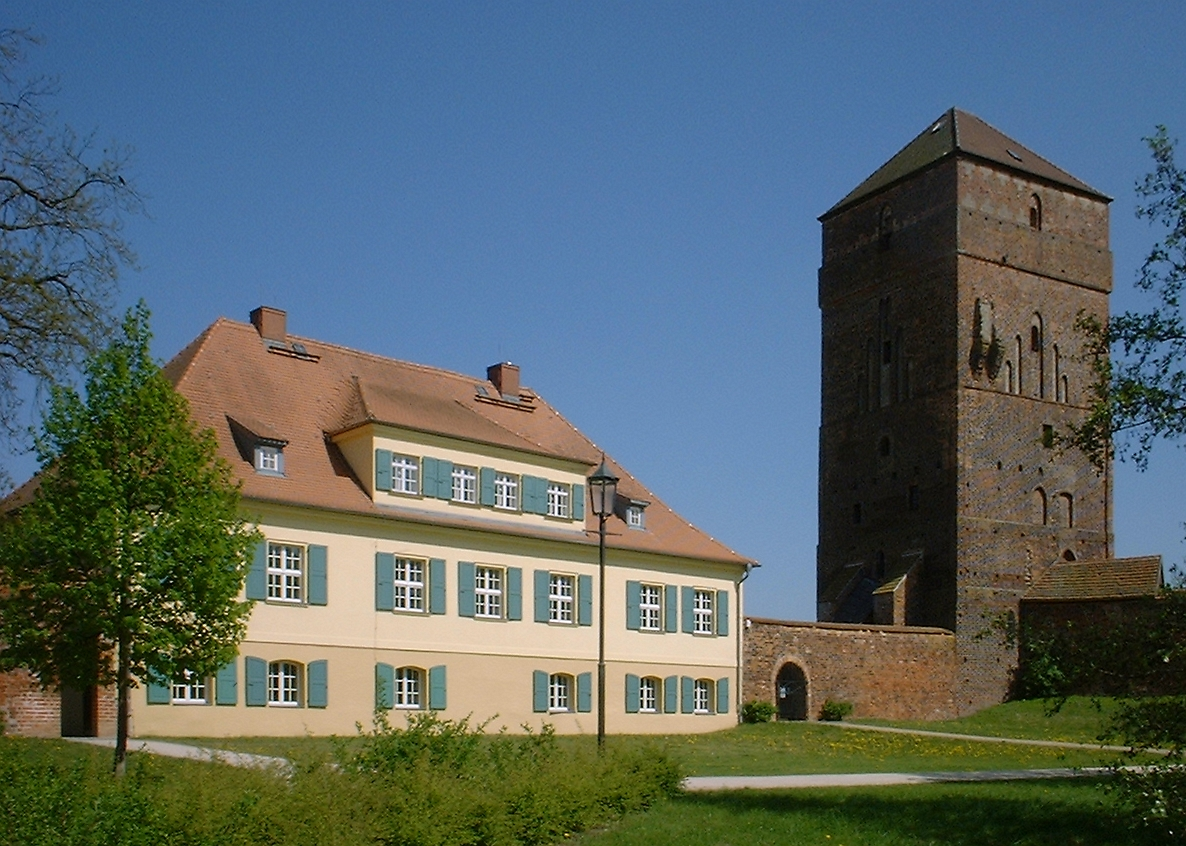
The Palace of the Bishops of Havelberg in Wittstock, Germany.

==== Relationship of chapter and bishop ====
There was no distinction between the monastic cathedral chapters and those of the secular canons, in their relation to the bishop or diocese. In both cases the chapter was the bishop's consilium that he was bound to consult on all important matters and without doing so he could not act. Thus, a judicial decision of a bishop needed the confirmation of the chapter before it could be enforced. He could not change the service books, or "use" of the church or diocese, without capitular consent, and there are episcopal acts, such as the appointment of a diocesan chancellor, or vicar general, which still need confirmation by the chapter, but the older theory of the chapter as the bishop's council in ruling the diocese has become a thing of the past, in Europe.

In its corporate capacity the chapter takes charge sede vacante of a diocese. In England, however (except as regards Salisbury and Durham), this custom has never obtained, the two archbishops having, from time immemorial, taken charge of the vacant dioceses in their respective provinces. When, however, either of the sees of Canterbury or York is vacant the chapters of those churches take charge, not only of the diocese, but of the province as well, and incidentally, therefore, of any of the dioceses of the province that may be vacant at the same time.

== Functions of a cathedral ==
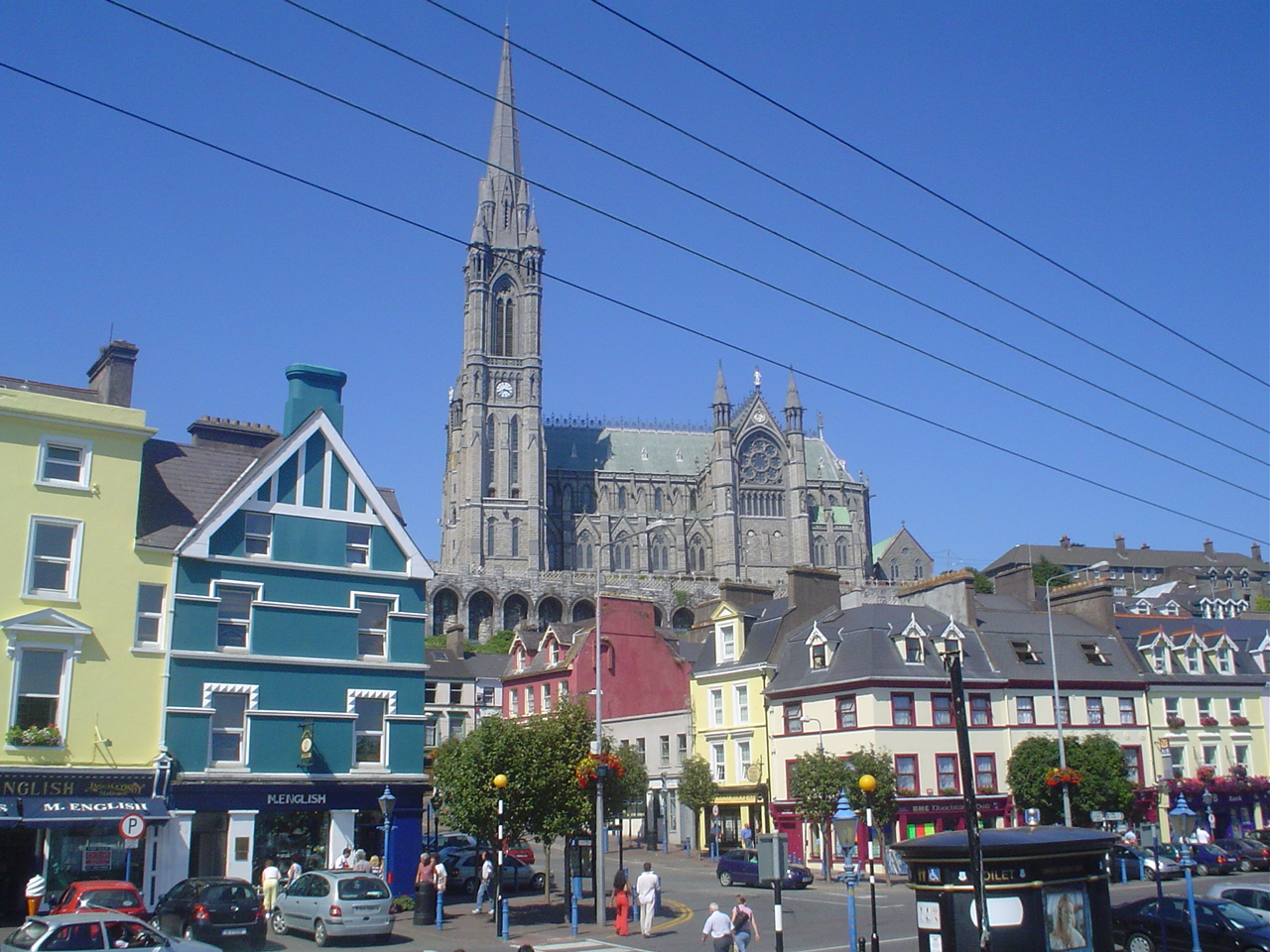
Many cathedrals are important landmarks. Cobh Cathedral, Ireland, rises up above the town.

The role of the cathedral is chiefly to serve God in the community, through its hierarchical and organisational position in the church structure. The building itself, by its physical presence, symbolises both the glory of God and of the church. A cathedral, its bishop and dignitaries have traditional functions that are mostly religious in nature, but may also be closely associated with the civil and communal life of the city and region.

=== Symbolic functions of the building ===
The cathedral is frequently one of the most ancient buildings in its town. The great size and splendor of the cathedral may be out of all proportion to the town itself. The money and talents expended on the building are seen as honoring God, and may also demonstrate both the devotion and the status of the patrons.

Cathedrals are very often oriented east/west, so that the worshipers look towards the rising sun, symbolizing the Risen Christ. The architectural form of the building most frequently has the ground plan of a cross. This form is both functional and symbolic, its symbolism referring to the cross on which Jesus was crucified. The form is liturgically functional as it allows the building to be divided into sections where different activities take place, or that are occupied by different people, such as the clergy, the choir and the laity.

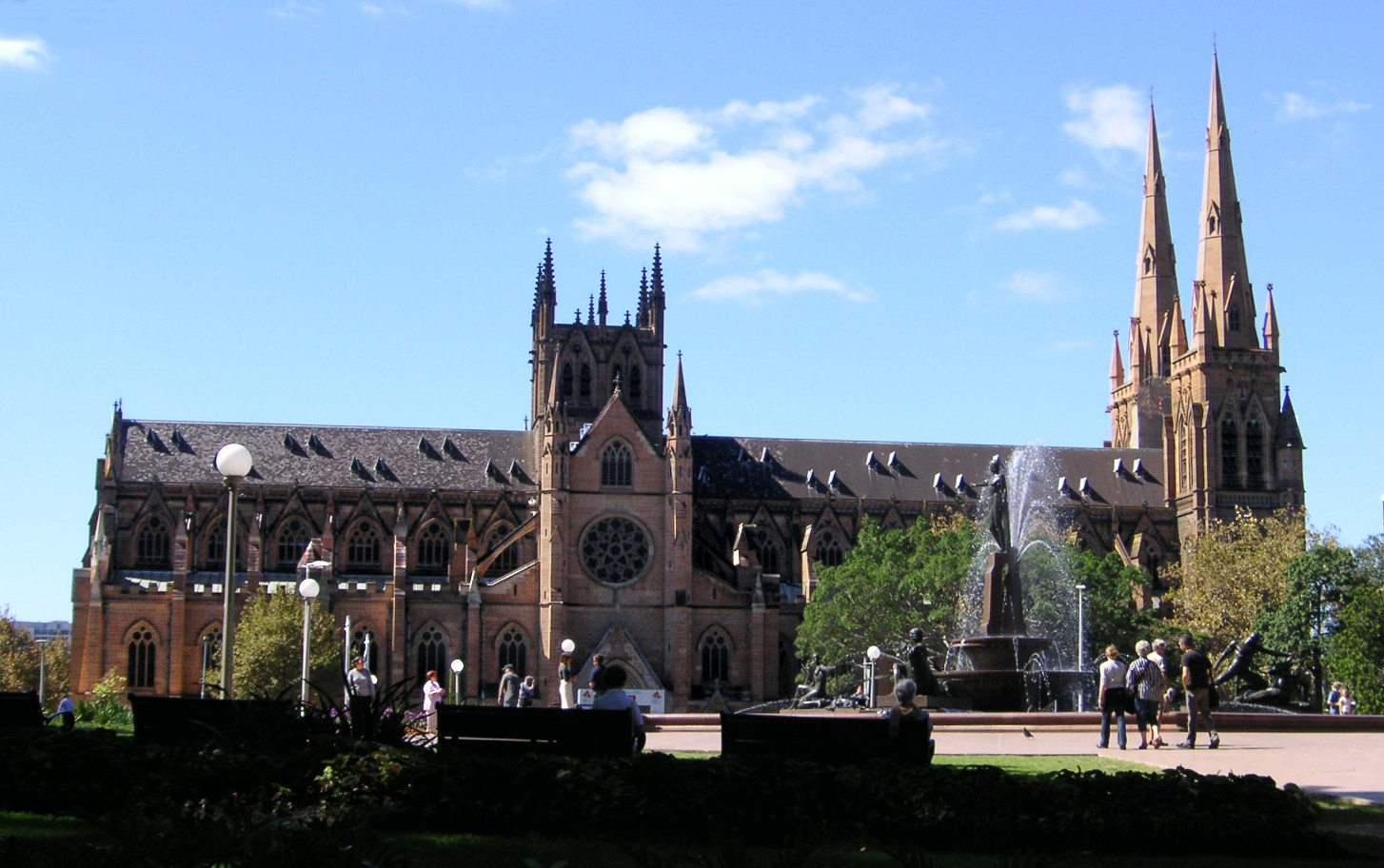
St. Mary's Cathedral, Sydney has a typical cruciform plan.

The main body of the building, making the longer arm of the cross, is called the nave, and is where worshipers congregate; the term is from the Latin word for ship. The cathedral is symbolically a ship bearing the people of God through the storms of life. The nave is also used for major processions, which gather or enter at the furthest door (liturgically generally called the West Door). The aisles on each side of the nave facilitate the movement of people within the building, without disrupting worshipers in the central space.

The arms of the cross are called the transepts and often contain a number of chapels. Farthest from the main entry is the sanctuary where the Blessed Sacrament is laid on the altar or communion table for the consecration. "Sanctuary" means "Holy Place". The word has passed into modern English with an altered meaning because traditionally a criminal who could gain access to this area without capture was thereby given the sanctuary of the church.

Cathedral buildings of the Western European tradition symbolize the progression of the Christian soul towards Salvation. Many cathedrals of Eastern European tradition are centrally planned. These churches are almost always domed. The symbolism in these cathedral structures is of the hierarchy of Earth and Heaven, and often reveals its meaning through the internal decoration of the building with frescoes or mosaics.

=== Religious functions ===
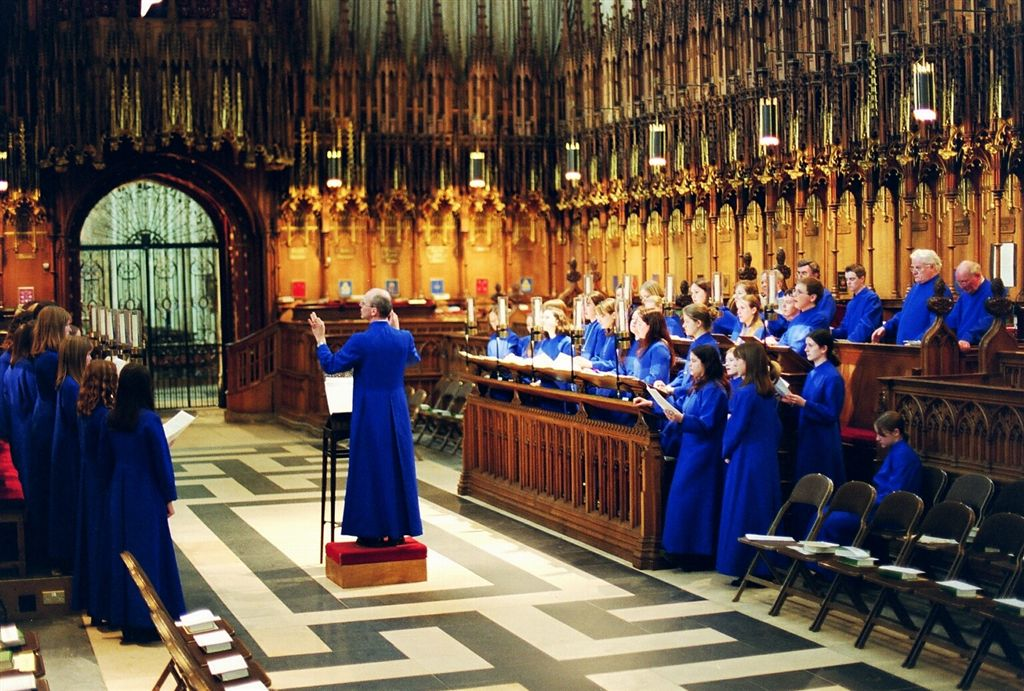
Music is an important part of cathedral services. Choir practice at York Minster, England.

Apart from its organisational function as the seat of the bishop, and the meeting place for the chapter of the diocese, the cathedral has a liturgical function in offering daily church services. Most cathedrals have at least three services of worship every day, often taking the form of matins, Holy Communion and an evening service which is often sung by the precentor and choir. There are often additional services on Sunday. Cathedrals generally have an area dedicated to the performance of choral services and with seating specifically for the choir and dignitaries of the church and town. This part of the building is called the Choir or Quire, and is generally located between the sanctuary and the nave. Because music often plays an important part in the performance of the liturgy, cathedrals generally have a pipe organ to accompany the choir.

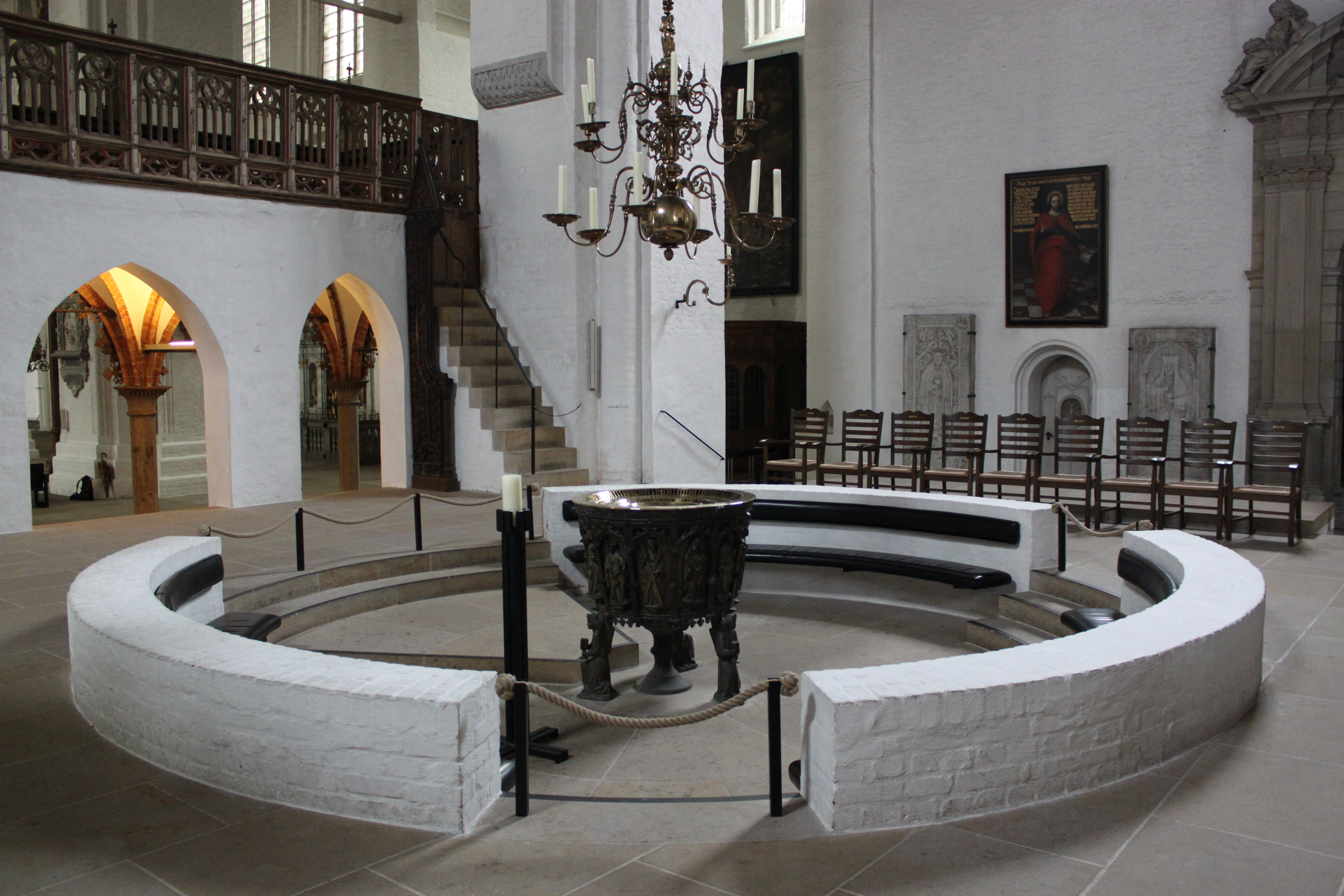
The baptismal font at Lübeck Cathedral, Germany

Cathedrals always have a font or water basin at which the rite of baptism is performed, in which a person is formally accepted into the Christian church. The font is often placed towards the door because the Baptism signifies entry into the community of the church. In some cathedrals, most particularly in Italy, the rite of baptism is performed in a separate building. One of the functions of the cathedral is the reading and expounding upon the Holy Scripture. The cathedral generally has a lectern from which the scripture is read. This often takes the form of an eagle of brass or carved wood which supports the book on its outstretched wings and is the symbol of John the Evangelist. However, some cathedrals retain elaborate medieval structures on either side of the church, one for the reading of the Gospel and the other for the reading of the Epistle.

The function of expounding on the scriptures is traditionally performed from the pulpit, which is generally constructed in such a way that the voice of the preacher is projected out to the congregation. The pulpit is often decorated with the winged figures of a man, a lion, a bull and an eagle, representing the Gospel writers, Matthew, Mark, Luke and John.

The services that are held within the cathedral follow an annual cycle. The designated scriptural readings for each day of the church's year establish a pattern that alternates periods of introspection and penitence with periods of celebration, and is punctuated by the two great celebrations of Christmas and Easter.

Many cathedrals are places of pilgrimage to which people travel in order to worship or venerate a holy object or the reliquary of a saint. Many cathedrals are regarded as places that have provided rewarding religious experiences, where prayers have been answered or miracles have taken place. Pilgrimage was particularly popular in the late medieval period. Some cathedrals such as Santiago de Compostela continue to attract pilgrims.

=== Civic and social functions ===
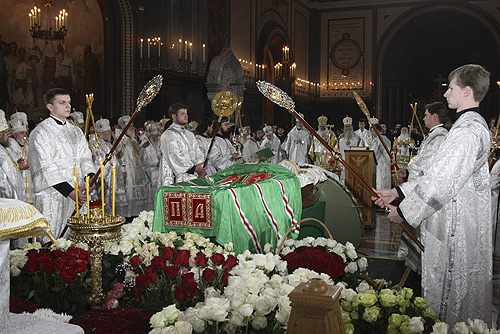
The funeral of the Patriarch Alexy II in the Cathedral of Christ the Saviour, Moscow

The formal cathedral services are linked to the cycle of the year and respond to the seasons of the Northern Hemisphere, Christmas falling in the winter and Easter in the spring. Cathedrals often hold a service of thanksgiving called Harvest Festival in the autumn.

Births, marriages and deaths are often celebrated by services at cathedrals and the cathedral often acts as a repository of local history by recording these events. The cathedral marks times of national and local civic celebration and sadness with special services. The funerals of those famous within the community are invariably held at cathedrals. People who have served the community or the church are often buried within the cathedral with which they are associated. Alternatively, they may be commemorated by a memorial. Some cathedrals, such as Aachen and Reims, are the traditional coronation places of monarchs.

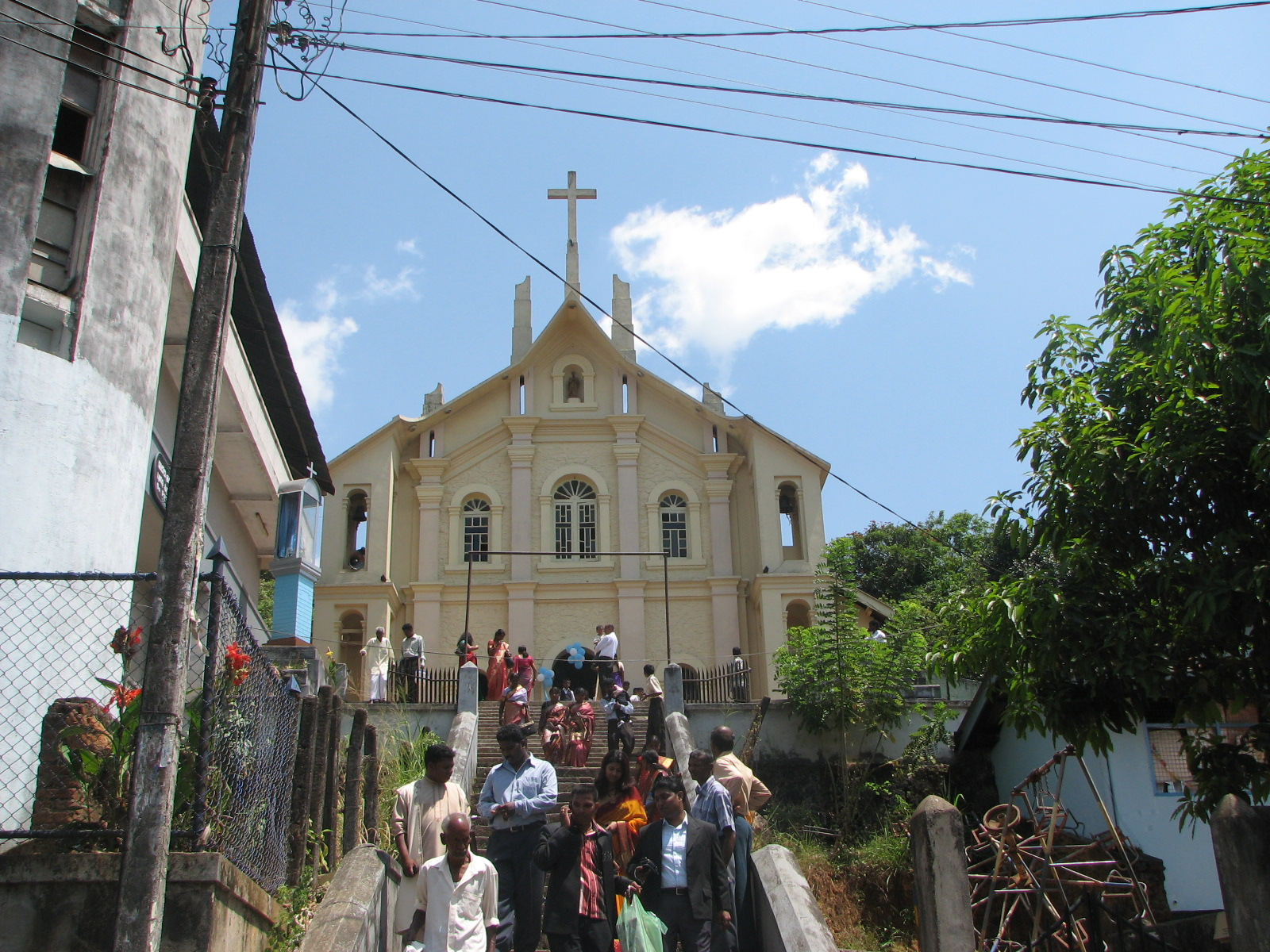
Cathedrals are important meeting places. After a service at Ss. Peter and Paul Cathedral, Sri Lanka

Another civic function of the cathedral is the imparting of significant civil information. Announcements may be to the populace from the steps of the cathedral, or within the cathedral itself.

Most cathedrals have a bell or bells. These are used to announce that a service is soon to take place. They are also used to convey information and celebration. The ringing of peals signifies a time of rejoicing, such as a wedding. An extended ringing of peals or "changes" conveys a time of great civic celebration. The slow tolling of the deepest bell signifies a death or disaster. Many cathedrals have a clock with associated chimes that announce the time. The bells of a cathedral are traditionally used to signal the outbreak and the ending of war.

Cathedrals are often associated with significant secular organisations such as the office of the local mayor and council, the local court, the local regiment, schools, sporting organisations and service clubs. The cathedral often has its own school, primarily for the education of choristers, but often including other children as well.

The cathedral, often being a large building, serves as a meeting place for many people. The cathedral often forms a centre of different activities related to community service, youth activities, study, music and decorative arts.

== Buildings ==
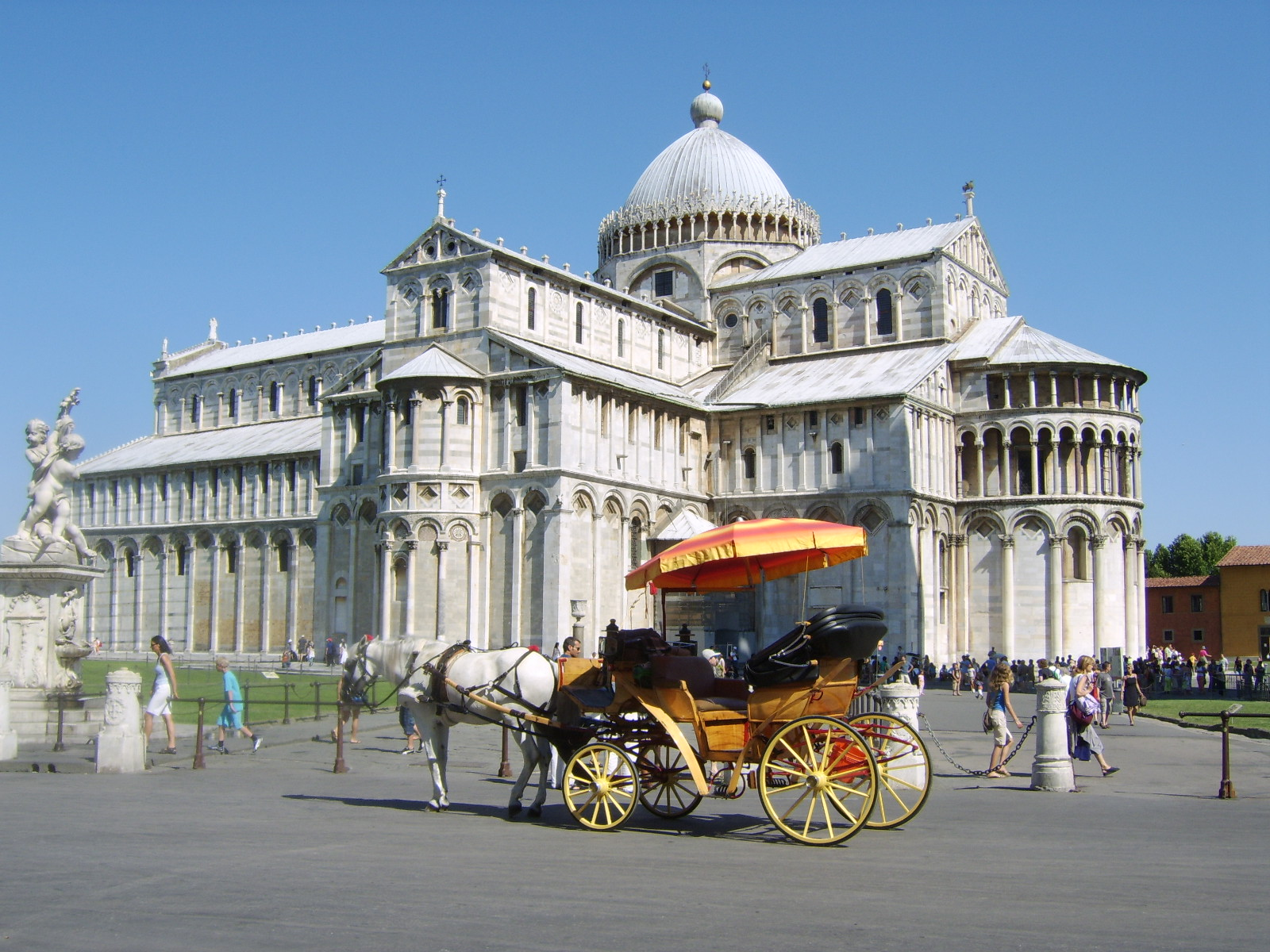
Some cathedrals are major tourist destinations and World Heritage Sites. Pisa is one of the best known.

Cathedral buildings, especially those dating from the Medieval period, are frequently the grandest of churches in the diocese (and country). The ancient cathedrals of England, of Northern France, Belgium, Spain, Portugal, Germany and Sicily, the Baroque cathedrals of South America, and many individual cathedrals from Italy and other parts of Europe, are among the largest and finest religious buildings. Many are renowned for their architecture or their decorative features such as sculpture, stained glass and frescos.

While cathedral buildings, in general, tend to be large, size and grandeur have rarely been essential requirements. Early Celtic and Saxon cathedrals tended to be of diminutive size, as is the Byzantine so-called Little Metropole Cathedral of Athens. In Italy, with a few notable exceptions such as Florence Cathedral and Milan Cathedral, cathedrals are numerous and are often similar in form and size to monastic or large parish churches. In modern times, where functionality is the foremost consideration and where church attendance is low in many countries, a cathedral church may be a modest structure.

Cathedrals of monastic foundation, and some of secular clergy, have cloisters, which traditionally provided an open area where secular activities took place protected from wind and rain. Some cathedrals also have a chapter house where the chapter could meet. In England, where these buildings have survived, they are often octagonal. A cathedral may front onto the main square of a town, as in Florence, or it may be set in a walled close as at Canterbury. There may be a number of associated monastic or clergy buildings, a bishop's palace and often a school to educate the choristers.

=== Artworks, treasures and tourism ===
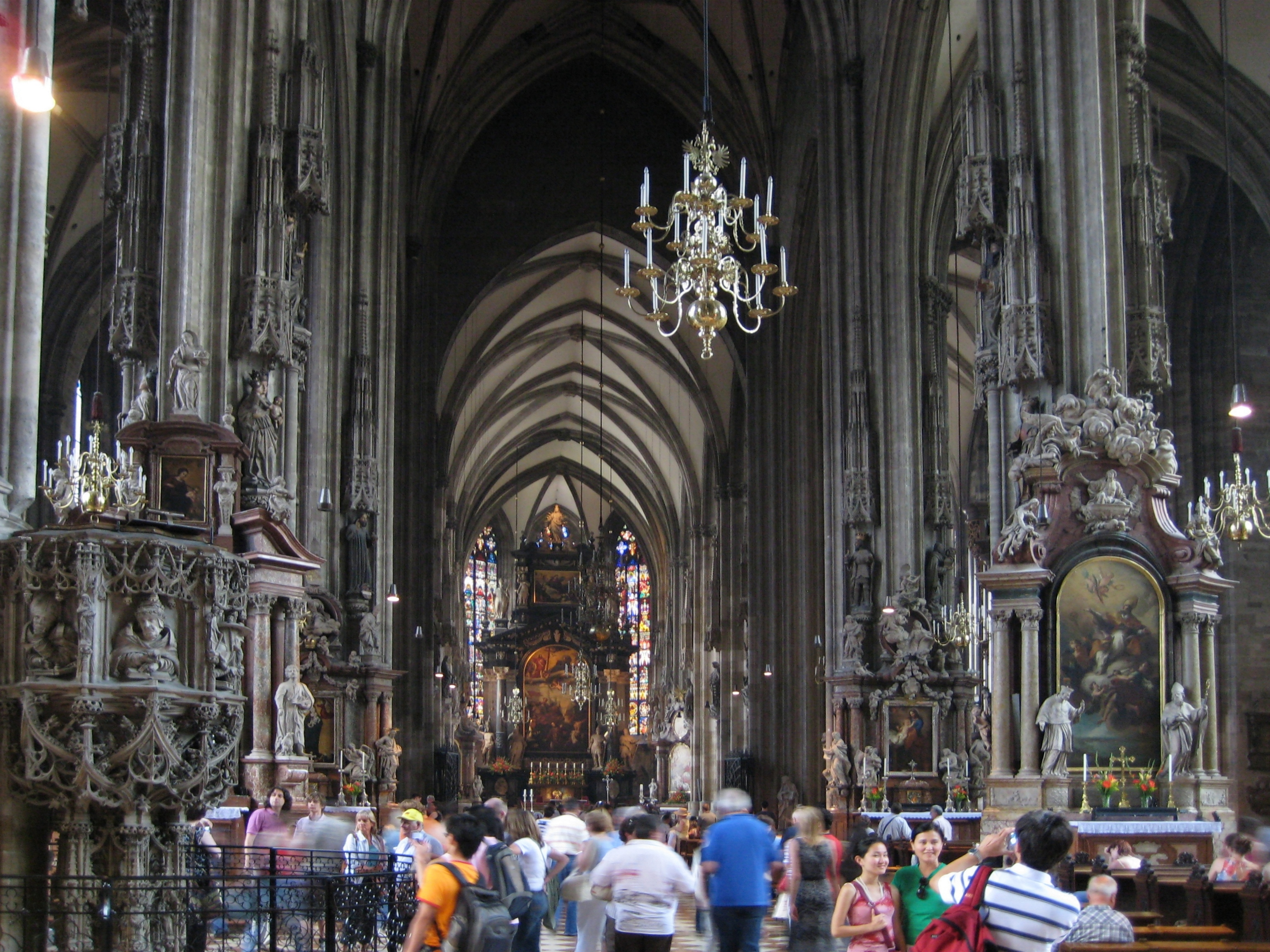
Cathedrals often contain a wealth of artworks. Tourists visiting the interior of St. Stephen's Cathedral, Vienna.

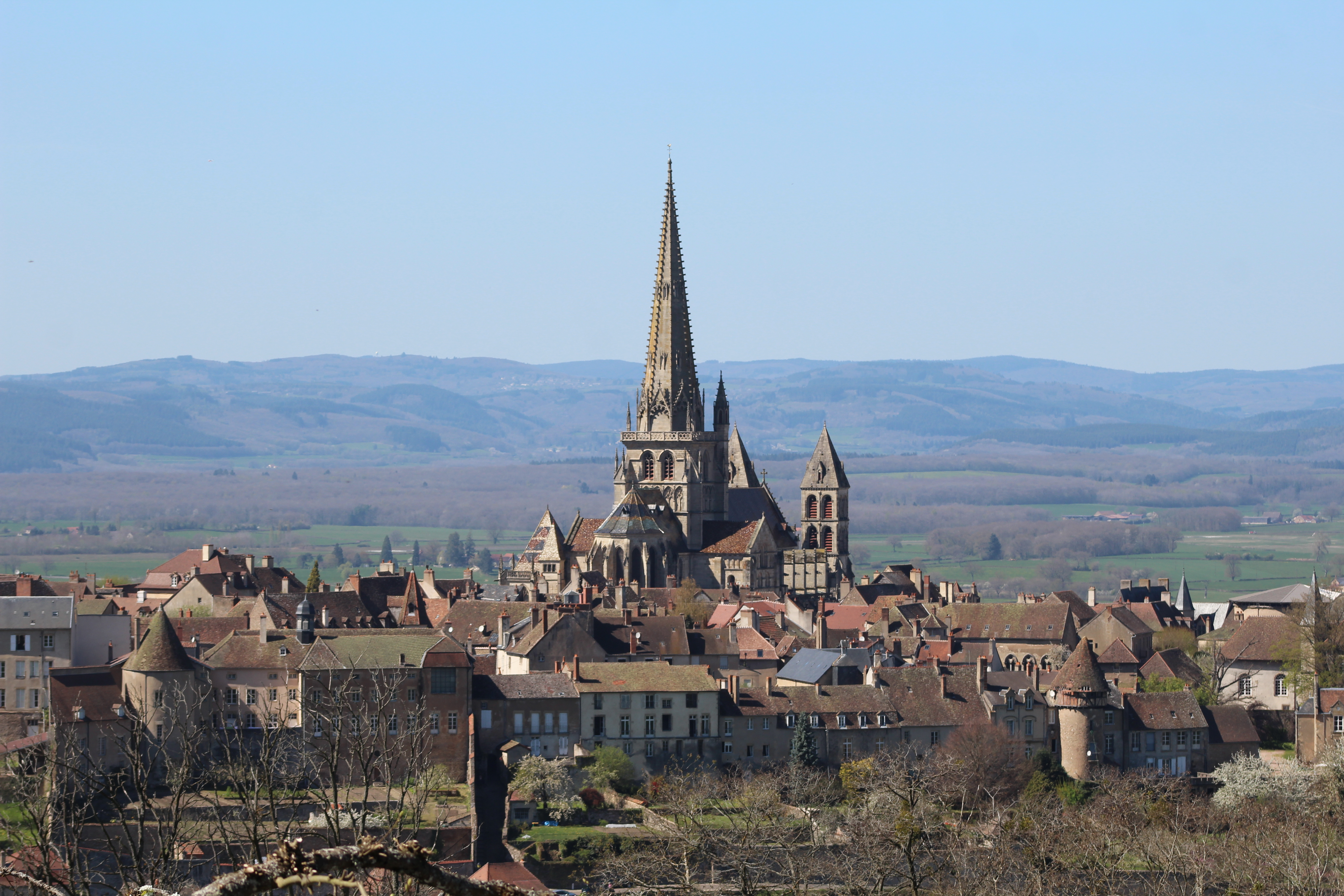
Autun Cathedral in France, overlooking the Morvan, one of the city's main tourist sights.

Many cathedral buildings are very famous for their architecture and have local and national significance, both artistically and historically. Many are listed among the UNESCO World Heritage Sites.

Many cathedrals, because of their large size and the fact that they often have towers, spires or domes, have until the 20th century, been the major landmarks in cities or in views across the countryside. With highrise building, civil action has been taken in some cases, such as Cologne Cathedral to prevent the vista of the cathedral from being spoiled.

Because many cathedrals took centuries to build and decorate, they constitute a major artistic investment for the city in which they stand. Not only may the building itself be architecturally significant, but the church often houses treasures such as stained glass, stone and wood statues, historic tombs, richly carved furniture and objects of both artistic and religious significance such as reliquaries. Moreover, the cathedral often plays a major role in telling the story of the town, through its plaques, inscriptions, tombs, stained glass and paintings.

For these reasons, tourists have travelled to cathedrals for hundreds of years. Many cathedrals cater for tourists by charging a fee to any visitors outside service times or requesting a donation or making a charge to take photos. Cathedrals that are particularly popular tourist venues sometimes provide guides, leaflets, souvenirs and cafes.

== See also ==
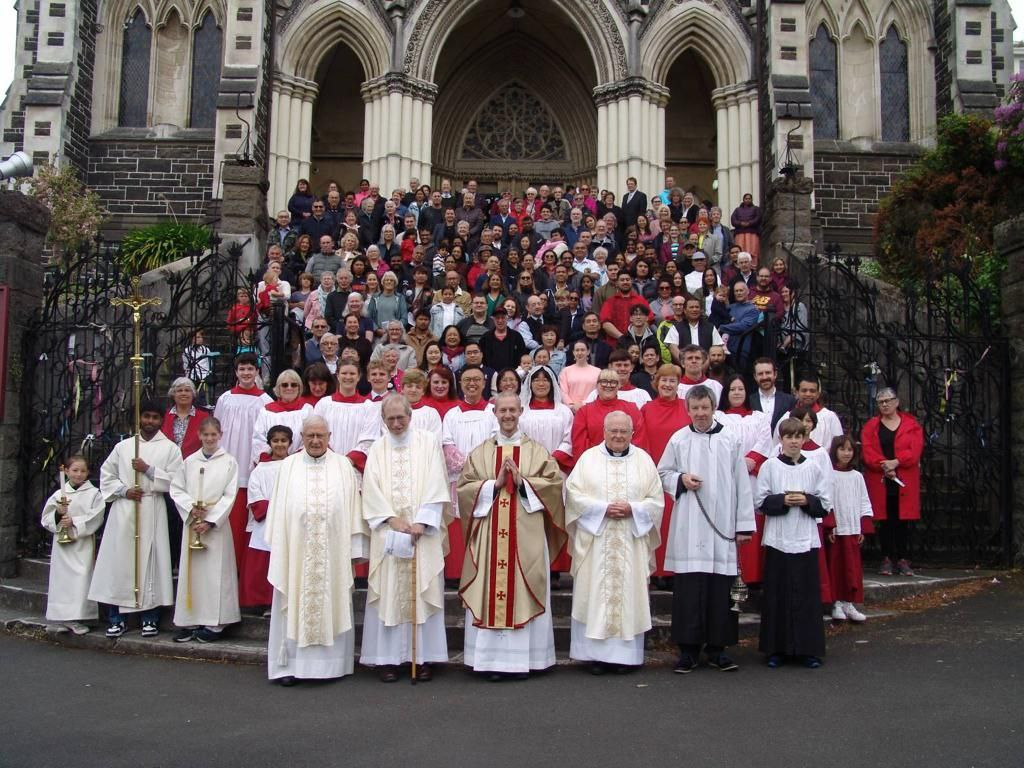
The staff and congregation of the Cathedral of St Joseph, Dunedin, New Zealand, 2023

- Architecture of cathedrals and great churches
- Architecture of the medieval cathedrals of England
- Basilica
- Cathedral architects in England
- Cathedral floorplan
- Duomo
- Gothic cathedrals and churches
- French Gothic architecture
- English Gothic architecture
- List of Catholic basilicas
- Lists of cathedrals by country
- List of highest church naves
- List of largest church buildings
- List of regional characteristics of European cathedral architecture
- List of tallest church buildings
