= Art Workers' Guild =

Organization of British artists

Coordinates: 51.52149°N 0.12272°W

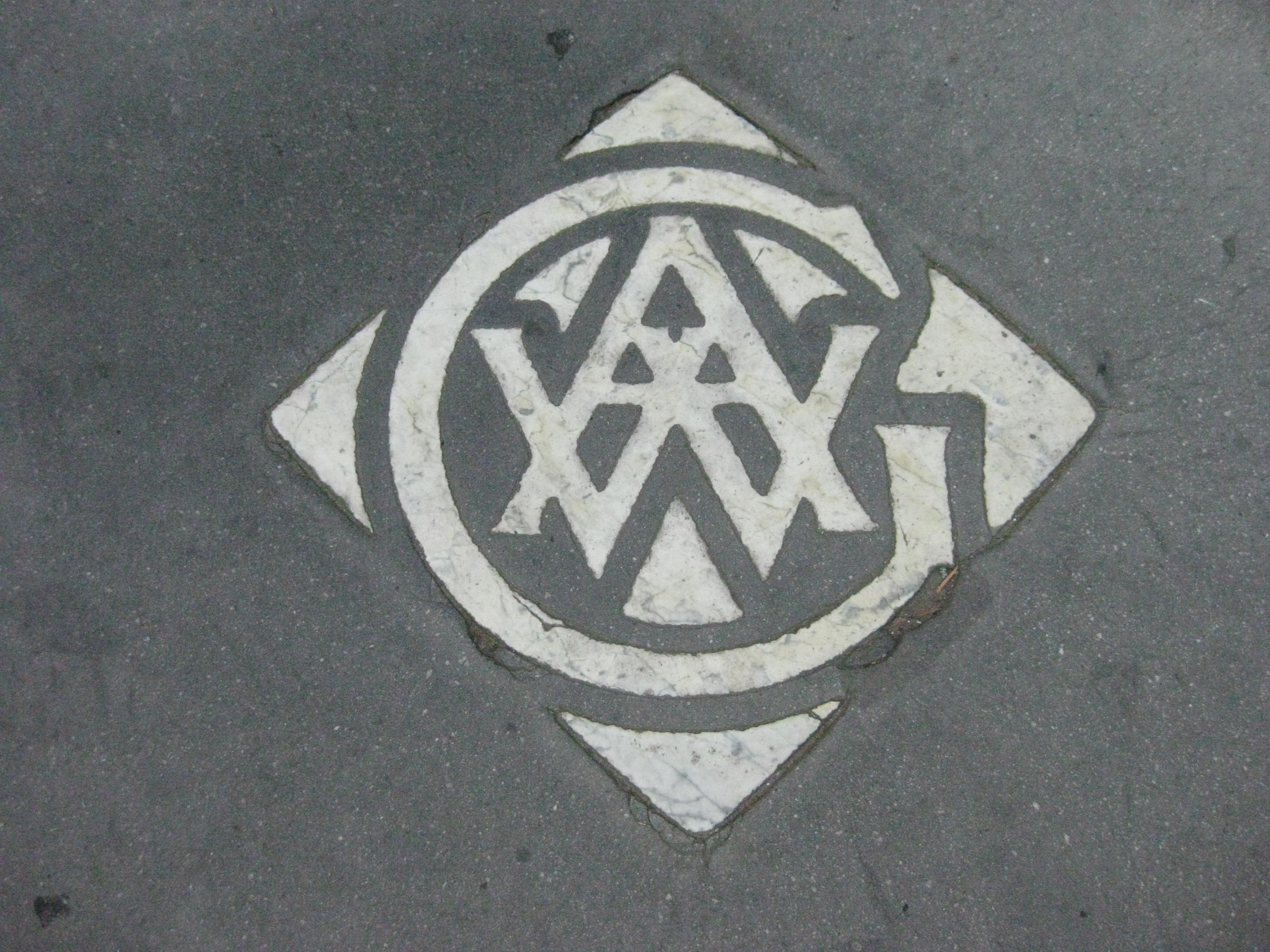
- Abbreviation: AWG
- Formation: 1884; 142 years ago
- Type: Arts organisation
- Legal status: Registered charity
- Purpose: To Advance Education In All The Visual Arts And Crafts
- Headquarters: 6 Queen Square, London, WC1N 3AT
- Region served: Predominantly UK
- Members: 350
- Master: Charlotte Grierson
- Website: http://www.artworkersguild.org

The Art Workers' Guild is an organisation established in 1884 by a group of British painters, sculptors, architects, and designers associated with the ideas of William Morris and the Arts and Crafts movement. The guild promoted the 'unity of all the arts', denying the distinction between fine and applied art. It opposed the professionalisation of architecture – which was promoted by the Royal Institute of British Architects at this time – in the belief that this would inhibit design. In his 1998 book, Introduction to Victorian Style, University of Brighton's David Crowley stated the guild was "the conscientious core of the Arts and Crafts Movement".

== History ==
The guild was not the first organisation to promote the unity of the arts. Two organisations, the Fifteen and St George's Art Society had existed previously, and the guild's founders came from the St George's Art Society. They were five young architects from Norman Shaw's office: W. R. Lethaby, Edward Prior, Ernest Newton, Mervyn Macartney and Gerald C. Horsley, plus metal worker W. A. S. Benson, designer Heywood Sumner, painter C. H. H. Macartney, sculptors Hamo Thornycroft and Edward Onslow Ford, and the architect John Belcher. The motive for the guild's creation was the summer exhibition in 1883 at the Royal Academy of Arts, where the "mother of arts" were snubbed to two side walls in one gallery. Edward Prior wrote in November 1883,

Painters, Sculptors, and Architects are in danger of settling permanently into three distinct professions, oblivious of one another's aims. A Society is wanted to restore their former union with one another with a programme of cohesion such as the Royal Academy hardly now suggests, and which the Institute of British Architects has deliberately rejected.

Others were soon invited to join, including Fifteen members Lewis Foreman Day, George Blackall Simonds and J. D. Sedding, as well as architects Somers Clarke, John Thomas Micklethwaite, W. C. Marshall, Basil Champneys; painters Herbert Gustave Schmalz, Alfred Parsons, John McLure Hamilton, William R. Symonds and etcher Theodore Blake Wirgman. The first meeting took place on 18 January 1884 at Charing Cross Hotel with Belcher as chair, and after some debate agreed they would invite others "for promoting greater intercourse among the Arts". Several names were proposed, including Guild of Art by Benson, Guild of Associated Arts, Guild of Art Workers, The Art Workers and the Society of Art Workers. Prior combined the name ideas and put forward the Art Workers' Guild and wrote the Guilds prospectus. The name and prospectus was agreed and the guild was formally created on 11 March and by its first formal annual meeting on 5 December 1884 it had grown to 56 members. The guild was based on the medieval trade guilds, with members called Brothers and its head called Master. Its first master was the sculptor, George Blackall Simonds. In 1885, Walter Crane reiterated the guild's worries to the Fabian Society,

Artistic expression had only reached its noblest and most beautiful results under collective condition of the arts, at all events when all art was decorative, and all were allied to architecture.

The guild organised talks, lectures, demonstrations and meetings to bring unity of the arts to its members including guest speakers such as Lucien Pissarro in 1891. Sir Edwin Lutyens was first invited as a guest in 1892 and recalled:

then, no one knew me and those few that did patronised or snubbed me

but he joined later and admired the freedom to argue passionately and:

the way those fellows lay into each other

By 1895 the guild had 195 members and included such luminaries as William Morris and Thomas Graham Jackson. At that year's annual general meeting, the elected Master Heywood Sumner declared to the members:

the authorities are beginning to recognise that if you want a good man for a public post connected with the Arts, the Art Workers' Guild is the place to come for that purpose.

This comment was confirmed in 1900 when the government recruited guild members Thomas Graham Jackson, William Blake Richmond, Edward Onslow Ford, and Walter Crane to the Council for Advice on Art, and they reorganised the Royal College of Art in line with Art Workers' Guild ideals. Under Graham Jacksons' time as Master, the Guildsmen were looking at the purpose of the guild. Many, including Morris wanted the guild to be a more active force and put forward a Councillor to the London County Council to advise on the protection of historical buildings and advocate craftsmanship. However Graham Jackson was against politics and declared the guild should not be:

departing from the old lines on which it had advanced to its present position of usefulness and success

Graham Jackson decided training the next generation of artists was more important and created the Art Student Guild, which would go onto become the Junior Guild. The Junior Guild was not a great success and by 1928 was confirmed by members that it had outlived its purpose. However, Masters H. M. Fletcher and Basil Oliver had come through the junior guild.

In 1902, on retiring from the Master's position, George Frampton stressed that only properly qualified candidates should be elected to the guild, and in 1905 the membership election system was amended. By this time the membership had grown to 235. Frampton had also recommended that the guild set up a benevolent fund for hard up members, which became known as the Guild Chest. However Frampton caused controversy in 1915, calling for Karl Krall, a German-born member, to have his membership revoked due to his nationality during World War I. The guild voted by a one-vote majority to allow Krall to keep his membership, so Frampton resigned. Krall was so upset by the debates that led to the vote that he also resigned and asked that he never be contacted by the guild again.

During World War II the guild's income dropped considerably, however they remained solvent under the "zealous guardianship of the funds" of honorary treasurer Laurence Arthur Turner. In 1945, the War Memorial Advisory Committee asked the guild for its ideas on war memorials, to which the guild responded by deploring mass-produced war memorials and advising on well designed carved inscriptions on the walls of the church cut by individual craftsmen.

The Art Workers Guild gave rise to many offshoots, including the Birmingham, Liverpool, the Northern Art Workers' Guild in Manchester, the Edinburgh Art Workers' Guild and the Junior Art Workers' Guild but the biggest was the Arts and Crafts Exhibition Society. There was even a guild set up in Philadelphia. The guild began as a male-only organisation, leading May Morris to start the Women’s Guild of Arts in 1907 as an alternative for women. In 1914 the women's guild was allowed to use the meeting hall at Queens Square, but they were not allowed to have their roll call on the walls. There was great discussion between members about letting in women with Hamilton T. Smith writing to Arthur Llewellyn Smith in 1958 stated:

Ladies. My instinct is against this proposal but I don't know that I feel strong enough to fight it very hard

In the 1959 Annual Report, it stated that it was "discussed at length but not put to the vote, it being felt that so revolutionary a proposal needed further careful discussion". Further discussions occurred over the next few years, and in 1962 past master Brian Thomas asked:

whether there was any evidence that women wanted to join the guild

It was not until 1964 that the brothers, at a special meeting, agreed to admit women to the guild. The first women to join was the wood engraver Joan Hassall who became the first female Master in 1972. In 1949, the members of the Junior Art Workers' Guild were invited to join the guild after their organisation closed down.

In 1985, a centenary exhibition was held at the Brighton Museum and Art Gallery. In a review of the exhibition by Colin Amery in The Burlington Magazine, Amery stated that the exhibition showed "the current Guildsmen work did not have the weight and quality to carry hope of a new spring".

== The guild's home ==
The guild held its meetings initially in rented space. Between 1884 and 1888, it used the Century Club's rooms at 6 Pall Mall Place in Pall Mall, London, from 1888 to 1894 it used Barnard's Inn, Holborn and then between 1894 and 1914 they used Clifford's Inn. In 1914, the lease on Clifford's Inn was to end and the organisation was looking for a new home. The Central School of Art and Design was offered as temporary accommodation by London County Council, with negotiations being held by F. V. Burridge, the college's principal.

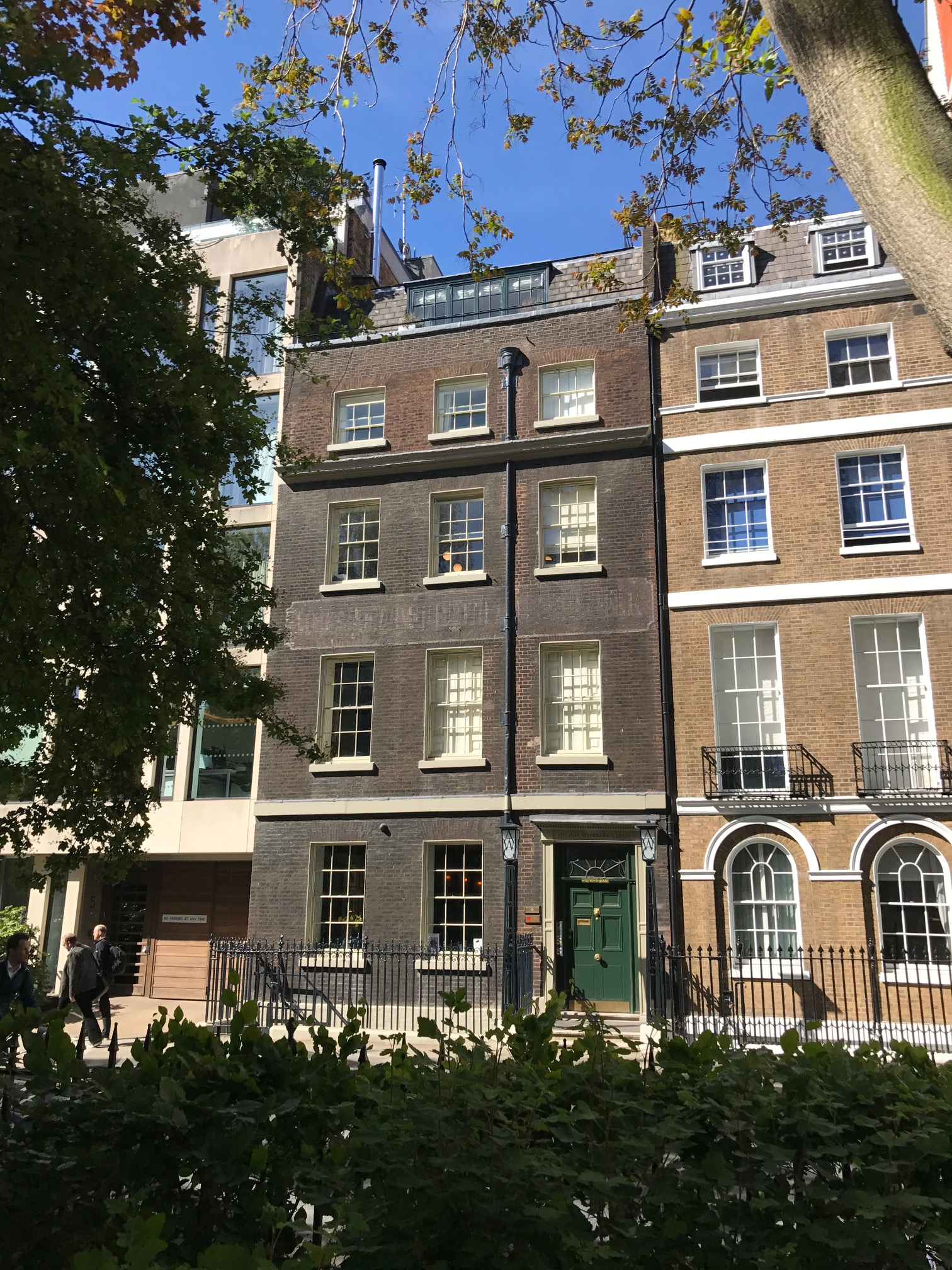
The exterior of the Art Workers' Guild

However, the architects Arnold Dunbar Smith and Cecil Claude Brewer had an office in the front of the early Georgian house at 6 Queen Square, Bloomsbury and, when they heard that the freehold was for sale, encouraged the guild to buy it. The back part of the building was reconstructed as a meeting hall, designed by Francis William Troup and inaugurated on 22 April 1914. At the opening, Master Harold Speed said to his fellow Brothers that he knew they would miss,

the picturesque and loveable old hall and Inn

but encouraged them to enjoy

the satisfaction of being our own masters in our own home, and shall doubtless accumulate in the future, traditions and properties in Queen Square, which will render the new home even dearer and more interesting to us than the old

The hall was furnished with rush-seated chairs made in Herefordshire by Philip Clissett and his grandsons between 1888 and 1914, and afterwards copied by Ernest Gimson and his successors. The Master sits in a seat designed by Lethaby and a table by Benson. The names of all members up to the year 2000 are painted on a frieze around the walls of the Hall. The list of names now continues in the front room known as the ‘Master’s Room’. In 2017 the building was modernised under the direction of Simon Hurst, the honorary architect of the guild. The building contains portraits of every Master since 1884.

The guild rents space to the British Society of Master Glass Painters at Queen Square. The top two floors are rented as an apartment to designers Ben Pentreath and Charlie McCormick.

== Recent history and notable members ==
The guild is today a society of artists, craftsmen and designers with a common interest in the interaction, development and distribution of creative skills. Its 350 members work at the highest levels of excellence in their professions, representing over 60 creative disciplines. Their main charitable aim is to support the visual arts and crafts in any way that may be beneficial to the community. The guild continues to programme lectures and workshops for its members to promote the exchange of knowledge among art workers of all disciplines.

Current notable members include artist Chila Kumari Burman, Jane Cox, a Fellow of the Craft Potters Association and Chair of the Outreach Committee of the Art Workers Guild (who run projects across various institutions such as the V&A, Courtauld Institute, Watts Gallery and Imperial College London) and Fleur Oates, a lacemaker and embroiderer who is the artist in residence at Imperial College's vascular surgery department.

The guild was visited by Prince Charles and Camilla, the Duke and Duchess of Cornwall in 2015 as part of the London Craft Week. In 2018, the guild staged the exhibition Salon des Refusés, 30 pieces of work by RIBA’s Traditional Architecture Group that had been rejected by the Royal Academy's Piers Gough architecture room.

In 2023, the guild put forward designs from eight of its Brothers to create rough designs for King Charles coronation invitations. Andrew Jamieson was chosen and his floral design was printed on recycled card.

== Past Masters of the guild ==
- 1884–85 George Blackall Simonds
- 1886–87 John D. Sedding
- 1888–89 Walter Crane
- 1890 John Brett
- 1891 Sir W. B. Richmond
- 1892 William Morris
- 1893 J. T. Micklethwaite
- 1894 Heywood Sumner
- 1895 Edward Onslow Ford
- 1896 Sir T. Graham Jackson
- 1897 Lewis Foreman Day
- 1898 Thomas Stirling Lee
- 1899 Sir Mervyn Macartney
- 1900 Selwyn Image
- 1901 Sir Frank Short
- 1902 Sir George Frampton
- 1903 Charles Harrison Townsend
- 1904 Sir Emery Walker
- 1905 Sir Charles Holroyd
- 1906 Edward S. Prior
- 1907 William Strang
- 1908 F. W. Pomeroy
- 1909 Sir George Clausen
- 1910 Halsey Ricardo
- 1911 W. R. Lethaby
- 1912 C. W. Whall
- 1913 Edward Prioleau Warren
- 1914 Thomas Okey
- 1915 H. R. Hope-Pinker
- 1916 Harold Speed
- 1917 Henry Wilson
- 1918 Walter Shirley, 11th Earl Ferrers
- 1919 Arthur Rackham
- 1920 R. W. S. Weir(previously known as Robert Weir Schultz)
- 1921 R. Anning Bell
- 1922 Laurence A. Turner
- 1923 Francis W. Troup
- 1924 C. F. Annesley Voysey
- 1925 Gilbert Bayes
- 1926 John Leighton
- 1927 Sir Francis Newbolt
- 1928 F. Ernest Jackson
- 1929 C. R. Ashbee
- 1930 Henry Martineau Fletcher (also known as H. M. Fletcher)
- 1931 Edmund J. Sullivan
- 1932 Basil Oliver
- 1933 Sir Edwin Lutyens
- 1934 F. L. Griggs
- 1935 Ernest G. Gillick
- 1936 Harry Morley
- 1937 Frederick Marriott
- 1938 Richard Garbe
- 1939–40 Hamilton T. Smith
- 1941 Percy J. Delf Smith
- 1942 George Parlby
- 1943 Sir Albert Richardson
- 1944 William Henry Ansell
- 1945 James Humphries Hogan
- 1946 Cecil Thomas
- 1947 Stephen J. B. Stanton
- 1948 Eric Hesketh Hubbard
- 1949 T. A. Darcy Braddell
- 1950 Leonard Walker
- 1951 Cyril Kenneth Bird (also known as Fougasse)
- 1952 Gerald Cobb
- 1953 W. Godfrey Allen
- 1954 William Washington
- 1955 Reginald Robert Tomlinson
- 1956 Donald H. McMorran
- 1957 Brian D. L. Thomas
- 1958 Laurence Bradshaw
- 1959 Henry Medd
- 1960 Stuart Tresilian
- 1961 Sydney M. Cockerell
- 1962 Sir Gordon Russell
- 1963 Milner Grey
- 1964 Arthur Llewellyn Smith
- 1965 William J. Wilson
- 1966 William F. Howard
- 1967 John Brandon-Jones
- 1968 Charles Hutton
- 1969 Frederick Bentham
- 1970 Bruce Allsopp
- 1971 Paul Edward Paget
- 1972 Joan Hassall
- 1973 David Peace
- 1974 Rodney Tatchell
- 1975 Dennis Flanders
- 1976 Roderick Enthoven
- 1977 Arthur Bultitude
- 1978 Sean Crampton
- 1979 Rev. Gordon Taylor
- 1980 John Peter Foster
- 1981 Philip Bentham
- 1982 Margaret Maxwell
- 1983 John R. Biggs
- 1984 Sir Peter Shepheard
- 1985 John Skelton
- 1986 Paddy (Patricia) Curzon-Price
- 1987 Roderick Gradidge
- 1988 Carl Dolmetsch
- 1989 Roderick Ham
- 1990 John Lawrence
- 1991 Anthony Ballantine
- 1992 Kenneth Budd
- 1993 Marthe Armitage
- 1994 Robin Wyatt
- 1995 Richard Grasby
- 1996 Glynn Boyd Harte
- 1997 Josephine Harris
- 1998 Peyton Skipwith
- 1999 Ian Archie Beck
- 2000 Donald Buttress
- 2001 Zachary Taylor
- 2002 Edward Greenfield
- 2003 Christopher Boulter
- 2004 Sally Pollitzer
- 2005 Dick Reid
- 2006 Stephen Gotlieb
- 2007 Assheton Gorton
- 2008 Brian Webb
- 2009 Alison Jensen
- 2010 Sophie MacCarthy
- 2011 Sir Edmund Fairfax Lucy
- 2012 George Hardie
- 2013 Julian Bicknell
- 2014 Prue Cooper
- 2015 Anthony Paine
- 2016 David Birch
- 2017 Phil Abel
- 2018 Jane Cox
- 2019 Anne Thorne
- 2020-21 Alan Powers
- 2021-22 Tracey Sheppard
- 2023 Fred Baier
- 2024 Rob Ryan
- 2025 Simon Smith
- 2026 Charlotte Grierson
