= Architectural development of the east end of medieval cathedrals =

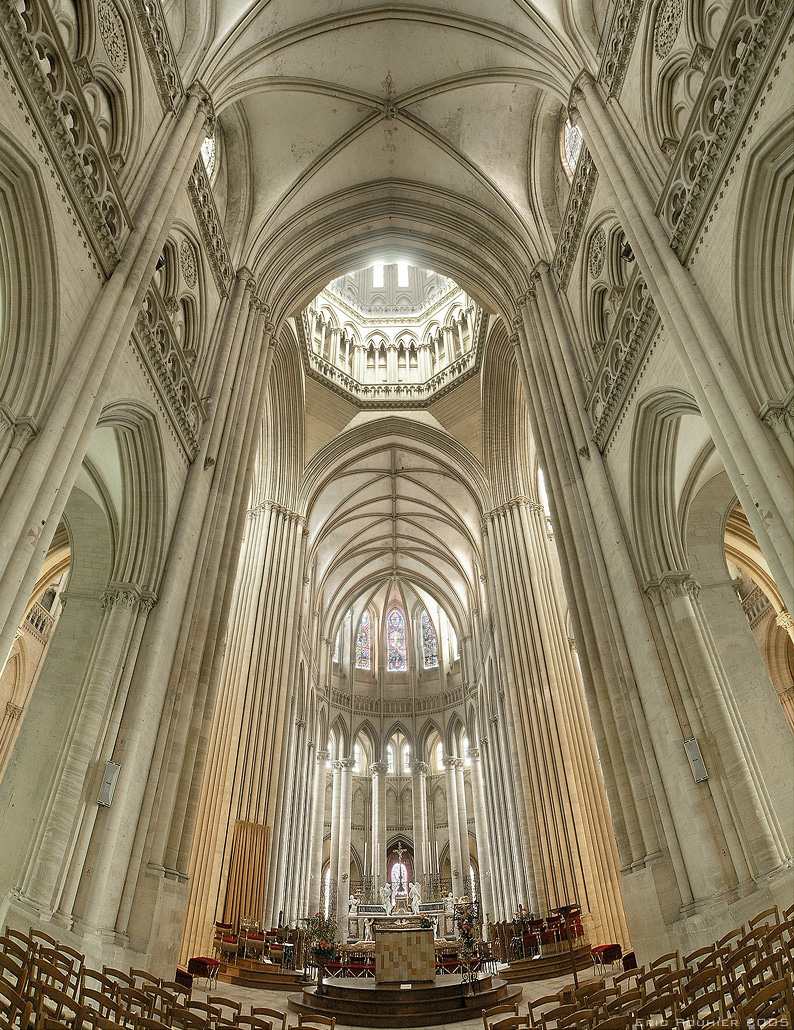
The interior of Coutances Cathedral, Normandy, France

The larger medieval churches of France and England, the cathedrals and abbeys, have much in common architecturally, an east–west orientation, an external emphasis on the west front and its doors, long arcaded interiors, high vaulted roofs and windows filled with stained glass. The eastern end of the building contains the Sanctuary and the Altar.

The part of the cathedral that shows the greatest diversity and the greatest change is the eastern end. This Article deals with the way the eastern end changed in English and Western European cathedrals from the middle of the 11th century to the close of the 14th century.

== The development of the eastern end of the cathedral ==
The earliest extended development of the eastern end of the cathedral is that which was first set out in Edward the Confessor's church at Westminster, probably borrowed from the ancient church of St Martin at Tours; in this church, dating probably back to the 10th century, two new elements are found:

- The carry of the choir aisle round a circular apse so as to provide an occasional aisle round the eastern end of the church
- Five apsidal chapels, constituting the germ of the chevet, which formed the eastern terminations of the French cathedrals of the 12th and 13th centuries.

== In England ==
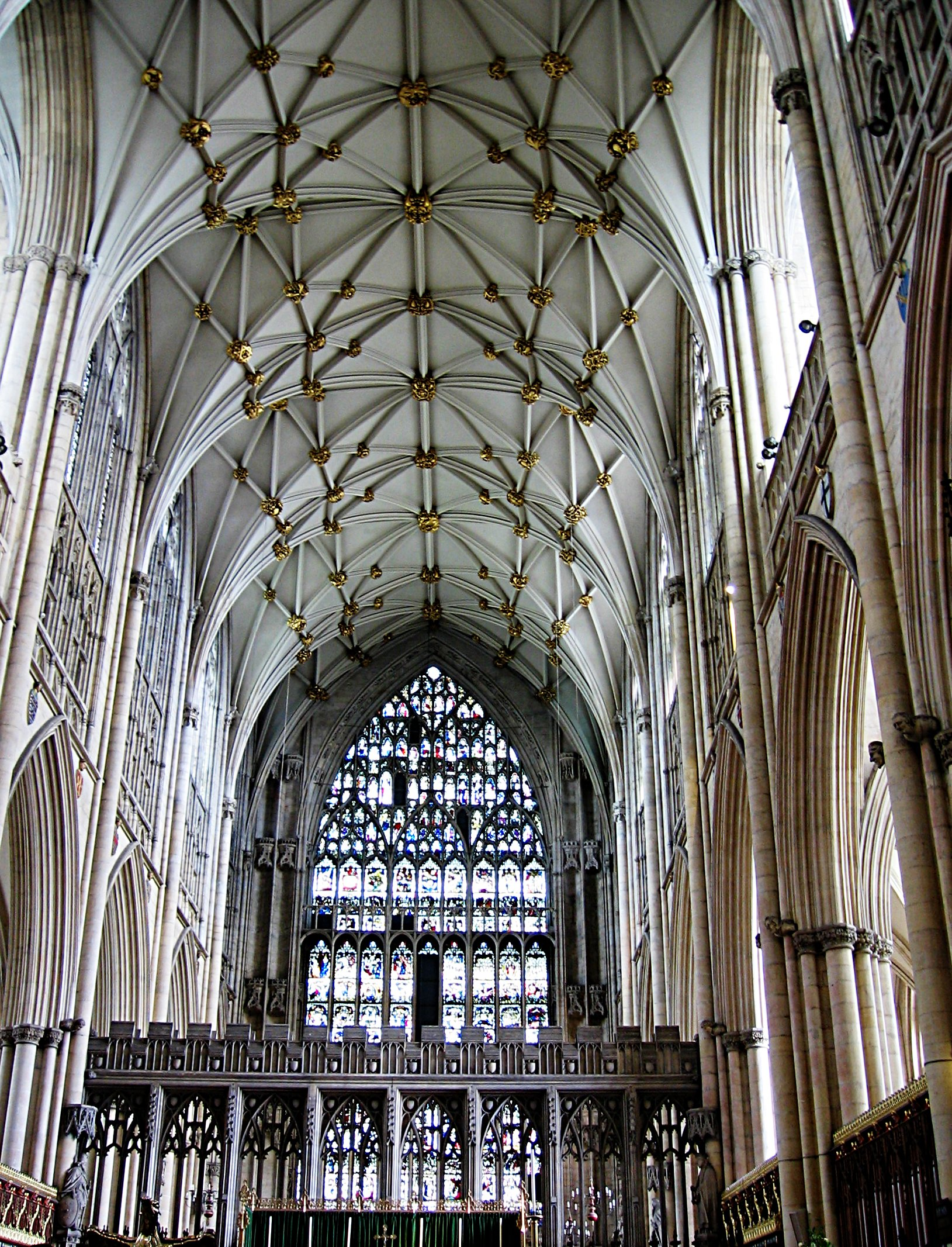
York Minster showing the typically English square east end

Gloucester Cathedral (1089) also had three chapels, two of which, on the north and south sides of the aisle, still remain; the same is found in Canterbury Cathedral (1096–1107) and Norwich Cathedral (1089–1119), the stern chapel in all three cases having been taken down to make way for the Lady-chapel in Gloucester and Norwich, and the Trinity chapel in Canterbury.

The semicircular aisle is said to have existed in the Anglo-Norman cathedral of Winchester, but the eastern end being square, two chapels were arranged filling the north and south ends, and an apsidal chapel projecting beyond the east wall. This semicircular processional aisle with chevet chapels was the favourite plan in the Anglo-Norman cathedrals, and was followed until about the middle of the 12th century, when the English builders in some cases returned to the square east end instead of semicircular apsidal termination. The earliest example of this exists in Romsey Abbey (c, 1130), where the processional crosses behind the presbytery, there being eastern apsidal chapels in the axis of the presbytery aisle and a central rectangular chapel beyond.

A similar arrangement is found in Hereford Cathedral, and exists in Winchester, Salisbury, Durham, Albans, Exeter, Ely, Wells and Peterborough Cathedral, except that in those cases (except Wells) the eastern chapels are square; in Wells Cathedral the most eastern chapel (the Lady Chapel) has a polygonal termination; in Durham Cathedral, the chapels are all in one line, constituting the chapel of the altars, which was probably borrowed from the eastern end of Fountains Abbey.

In some of the above designs, original design has been transformed in rebuilding; thus in Albans, Durham, York and Exeter cathedrals, there was no ambulatory but three parallel apses, in some cases rectangular externally. In Southwell, Rochester and Ely, there was no processional path or ambulatory round the end; in Carlisle no eastern chapels; and in Oxford only one central apse.

== Chevets ==
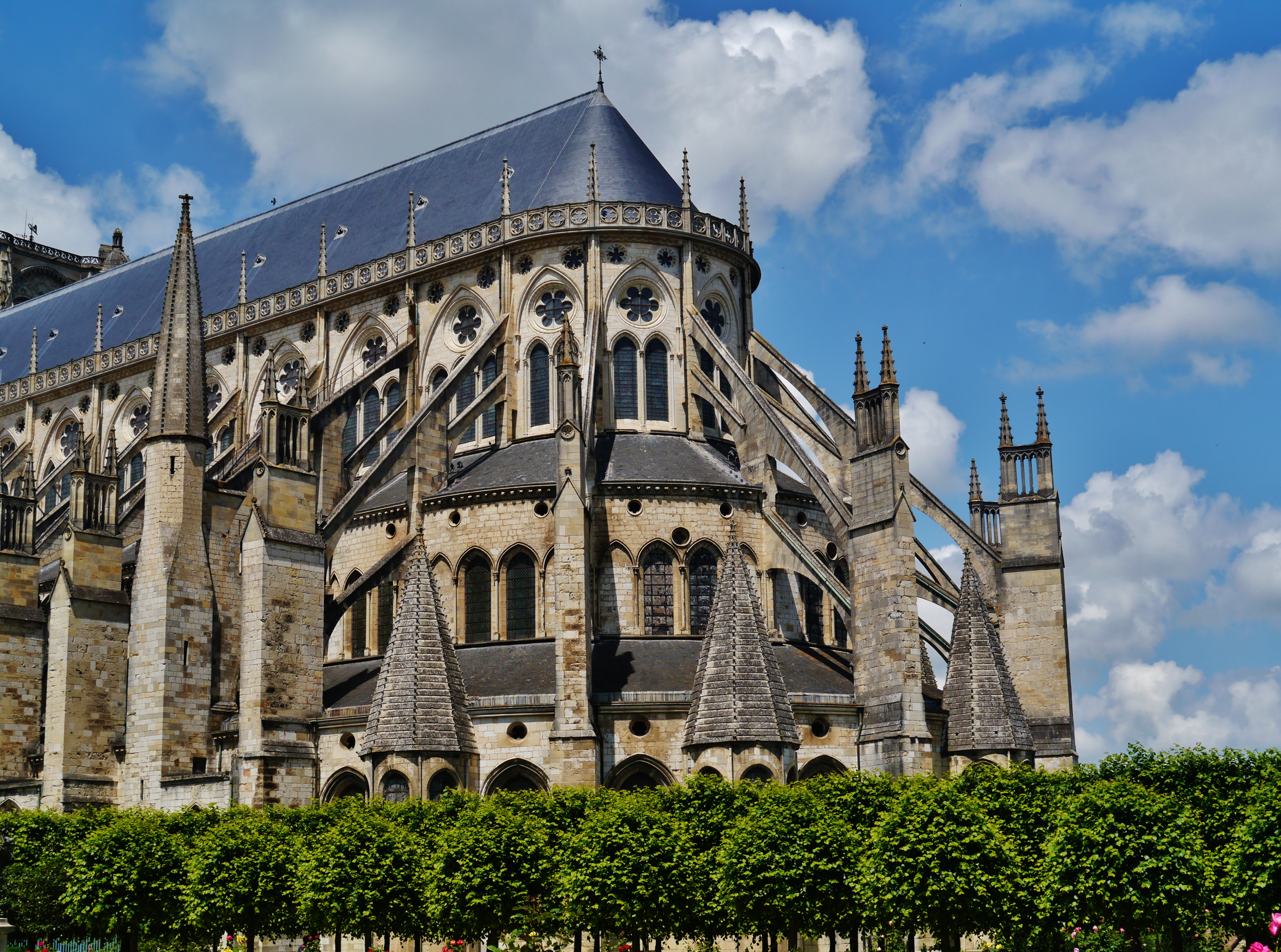
Chevet at Bourges Cathedral

The earliest example of the chevet is probably to be found in the church of St Martin at Tours; this was followed by others at Tournus, Clermont-Ferrand, Auxerre, Chartres, Le Mans and other churches built during the great church-building period of the 11th century. In some cases they used the old foundations, as in Chartres, Coutances and Auxerre cathedrals. In others, such as at Le Mans, they extended the eastern termination, much in the same way as in many of the early examples in England, except with this important difference: when the apsidal east end was given up in the middle of the 12th century in favour of the square east end in England, the French developed it by doubling the choir aisles and adding to the number of extra chapels.

This is demonstrated by the number of apsidal chapels in various churches:

- Three: Canterbury, Norwich, and Gloucester;
- Five: Noyon (1150), Soissons (1190), Reims (1212), Tours, Seez, Bayeux (1230), Clermont (1275), Senlis, Limoges, Albi and Narbonne;
- Seven: Amiens, Le Mans and Beauvais;
- Nine: Chartres.

Double aisles round the choir, of which there are no examples in England, are found in the cathedrals of Paris, Bourges and Le Mans. The cathedral of Sens (1144–1168) possesses one feature which is almost unique: the coupled columns of the alternate bays of nave and choir and of the apse. These were introduced into the chapel of the Trinity in Canterbury cathedral, probably from the designs of William of Sens, by his successor William the Englishman. The square east end found no favour in France, with Laon, Poitiers, and Dol being the only cathedral examples. Of the triapsal arrangement, which has apses in the aisle and a central apse, the only example is that of the cathedral of Autun.

In Rouen cathedral, east of the transept aisles, there are apsidal chapels, which with the three chapels in the chevet make up the usual number. The Cathedral of St. Peter in Poitiers has been referred to as an example of a square east end, but a compromise has been made by the provision of three segmental apses, and there are no windows in the east front; the most remarkable divergence from the usual design is found here in the absence of any triforium or clerestory, because the vault of the aisles is nearly as high as that of the nave, so that it constitutes an example of what in Germany (where there are many) are called Hallenkirchen; the light being obtained through the aisle windows only gives a gloomy effect to the nave.

== Southern France ==
Another departure from the usual plan is that found in Albi Cathedral (1350), in which there are no aisles, their place being taken by chapels between the buttresses which were required to resist the thrust of the nave vault, the widest in France. The cathedral is built in brick and externally has the appearance of a fortress. At the cathedrals in southwest France, where the naves are covered with a series of domes - as at St. Barthélemy in Saint-Étienne in Cahors, the cathedral of Angoulême and St. Front de Périgueux - the immense piers required to carry them made it necessary to dispense with aisles. The cathedral of Angouléme consists of a nave covered with three domes, a transept of great length with lofty towers over the north and south ends, and an apsidal choir with four chevet chapels. In St. Front de Périgueux (1150), based on St. Mark's at Venice, the plan consists of nave, transept and choir, all of equal dimensions, each of them, as well as the crossing, vaulted over with a dome, while originally there was a simple apsidal choir.

== Spain ==
The cathedrals in Spain follow the same lines as those in France. The cathedral of Santiago de Compostela is virtually a copy of St Sernin at Toulouse, consisting of nave and aisles, transepts and aisles, and a choir with five chapels; at Leon there is a chevet with five apsidal chapels, and at Toledo an east end with double aisles round the apse with originally seven small apsidal chapels, two of them rebuilt at a very late period. At Leon, Barcelona and Toledo the processional passage round the apse with apsidal chapels recalls the French disposition, there being a double aisle around the latter, but in Leon and Toledo cathedrals the east end is masked. At Avila and Salamanca (old cathedral) the triapsal arrangement is adopted.

== Germany ==
The triapsal arrangement is also found in the German Gothic cathedrals, with one important exception, the gigantic cathedral of Cologne, Germany, der Koelner Dom, which was based on that of Amiens, the comparative height of the former, however, being so exaggerated that scale has been lost, and externally it has the appearance of an overgrown monster.

== Other features ==
The immense development given to the eastern limb of the French cathedrals was some times obtained at the expense of the nave, so that, notwithstanding the much greater dimensions compared with English examples, in the latter the naves are much longer and consist of more bays than those in France. In one of the French cathedrals, Bourges, there is no transept; on the other hand there are many examples in which this part of the cathedral church is emphasized by aisles on each side, as at Laon, Soissons, Chartres, Reims, Amiens, Rouen and Clermont cathedrals. Transept aisles in England are found in Ely, York, Wells and Winchester cathedrals, in the last being carried round the south additional altars, exist in Durham, Salisbury, Lichfield, Peterborough and Ripon cathedrals; and on the north side only in Hereford cathedral

In the north of France, Amiens cathedral shows the disposition of a cathedral, with its nave-arches, triforium, clerestory windows and vault, the flying buttresses which were required to carry the thrust of the vault to the outer buttresses which flanked the aisle walls, and the lofty pinnacles which surmounted them. In this case there was no triforium gallery, owing to the greater height given to the aisles. In Notre Dame at Paris the triforium was nearly as high as the aisles; in large towns this feature gave increased accommodation for the congregation, especially on the occasion of great fetes, and it is found in Noyon, Laon, Senlis and Soissons cathedrals, built in the latter part of the 12th century; later it was omitted, and a narrow passage in the thickness of the wall only represented the triforium; at a still later period the aisles were covered with a stone pavement of slight fall so as to allow of loftier clerestory windows.

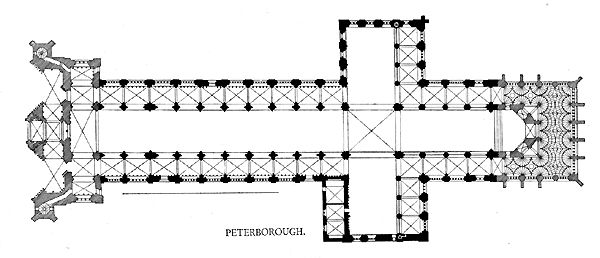
Peterborough Cathedral showing round chancel and remodelled ambulatory

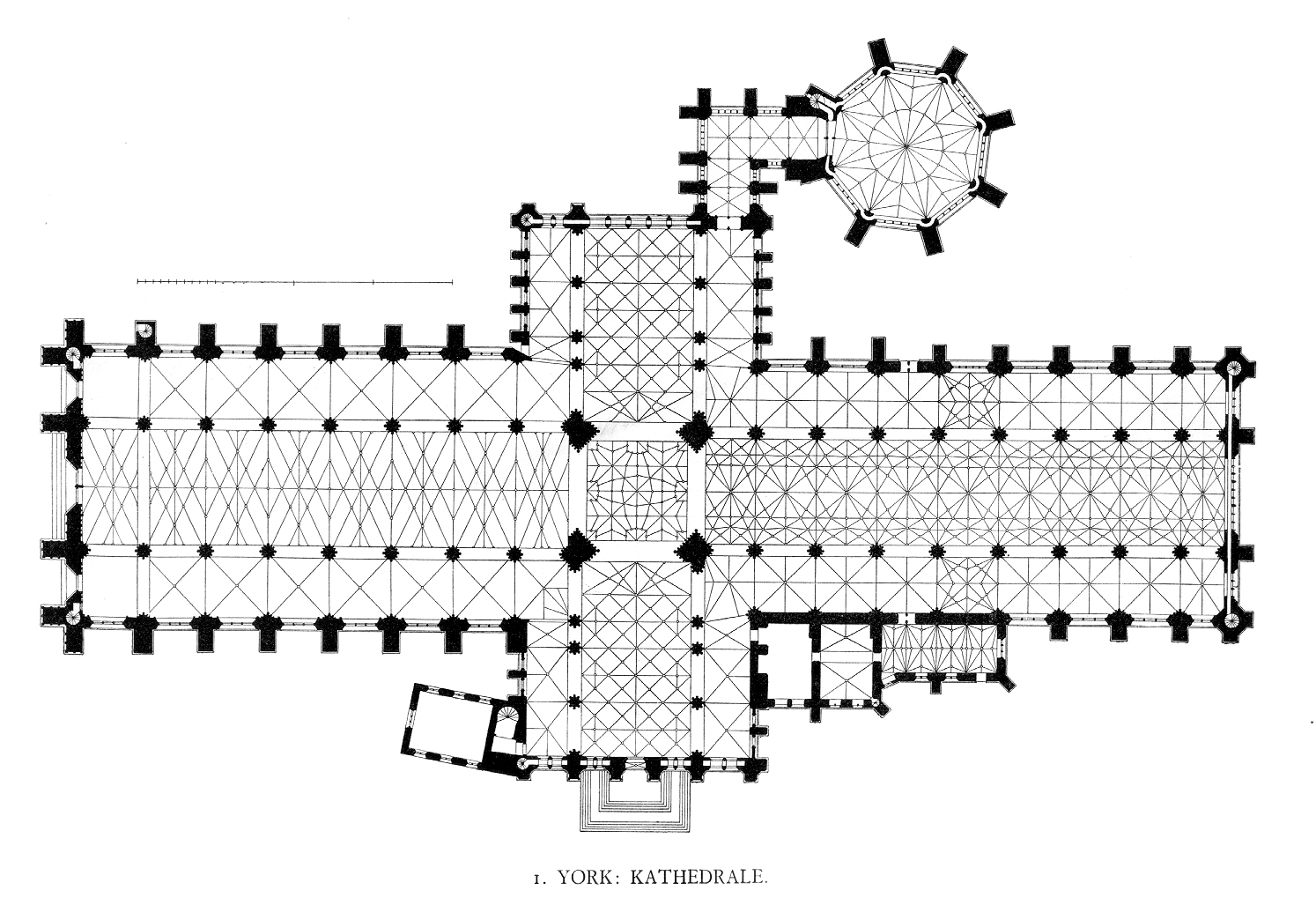
York Minster showing square English east end

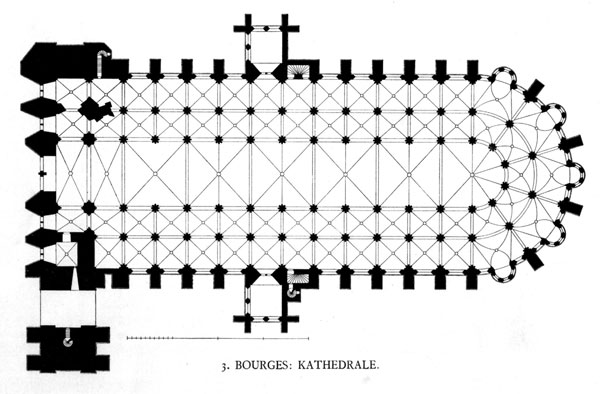
Bourges Cathedral showing double ambulatory

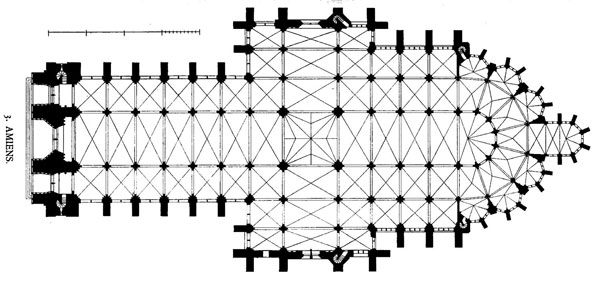
at Amiens Cathedral seven radiating chapels form a chevet

== See also ==
There is a webpage for every English Cathedral mentioned and for some French, German and Spanish Cathedrals discussed here.

- Architecture of cathedrals and great churches
- Cathedral Architect
- List of regional characteristics of European cathedral architecture
- List of cathedrals
- Romanesque architecture
- Gothic architecture
- Victorian architecture
- Cathedral diagram, including descriptions of the following:
  - nave
  - aisle
  - quire/choir
  - apse
  - chevet
  - Lady Chapel
  - porch
- Triforium
- Clerestory
- Vault
- Gargoyle
- Grotesque

== References and further reading ==
- Helen Gardner, Fred S Kleiner, Christin J Mamiya, Gardner's Art through the Ages, 2004, Thomson Wadsworth ISBN 0-15-505090-7
- Banister Fletcher, A History of Architecture on the Comparative method, 2001, Elsevier Science & Technology ISBN 0-7506-2267-9
- Wim Swaan, The Gothic Cathedral, 1988, Omega Books ISBN 0-907853-48-X
- Wim Swaan, Art and Architecture of the Late Middle Ages, 1988, Omega Books, ISBN 0-907853-35-8
- Tim Tatton-Brown, John Crook, The English Cathedral, 2002, New Holland Publishers, ISBN 1-84330-120-2
- Francois Icher, Building the Great Cathedrals, 1998, Harry N. Abrams, ISBN 0-8109-4017-5
- Rolf Toman, editor, Romanesque- Architecture, Sculpture, Painting, 1997, Konemann, ISBN 3-89508-447-6
