= South Library (Islington) =

Public library in the London Borough of Islington, England

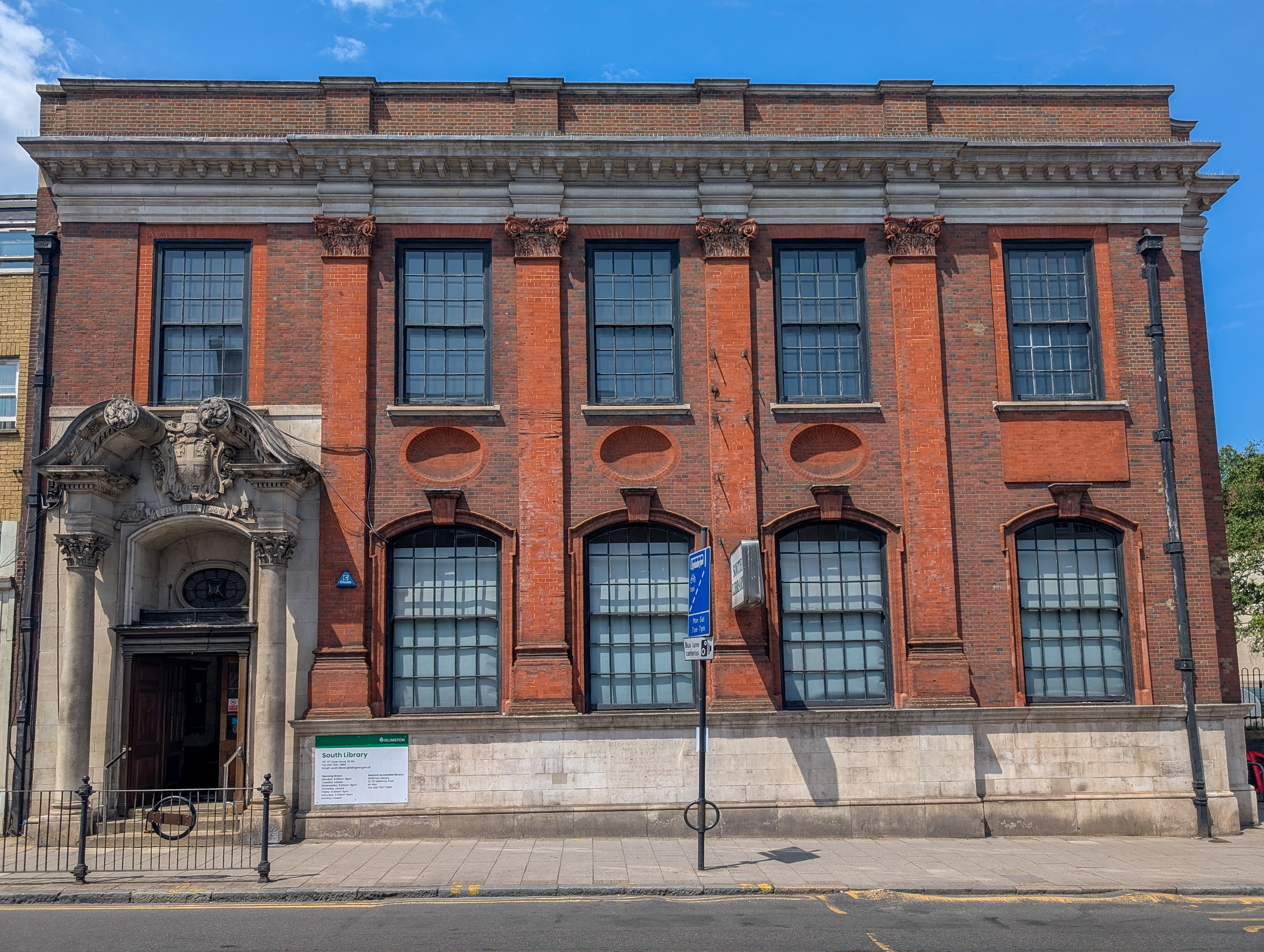
- The library in 2026
- 51.5393°N 0.0988°W
- Location: Essex Road; London, United Kingdom
- Type: Public library
- Established: 1921; 105 years ago
- Architect: Mervyn Macartney
- Branch of: Islington Libraries

Collection
- Size: 21,250

Access and use
- Circulation: 45,975 (2024/25)

Other information
- Director: Maria Colucci
- Public transit access: Essex Road; Highbury & Islington
- Website: Official website

Listed Building – Grade II
- Designated: 30 September 1994
- Reference no.: 1298054

South Library is a public library in the London Borough of Islington, England.

Located off Essex Road, it opened in 1921 as the "South-East" Library. It was awarded Grade II listed status in 1994.

== History ==
=== Construction and design ===
South Library was constructed as part of the initial construction of public library services in Islington, funded by Scottish-American industrialist Andrew Carnegie. The South Library was the last of the four Carnegie Libraries to be built in the Borough.

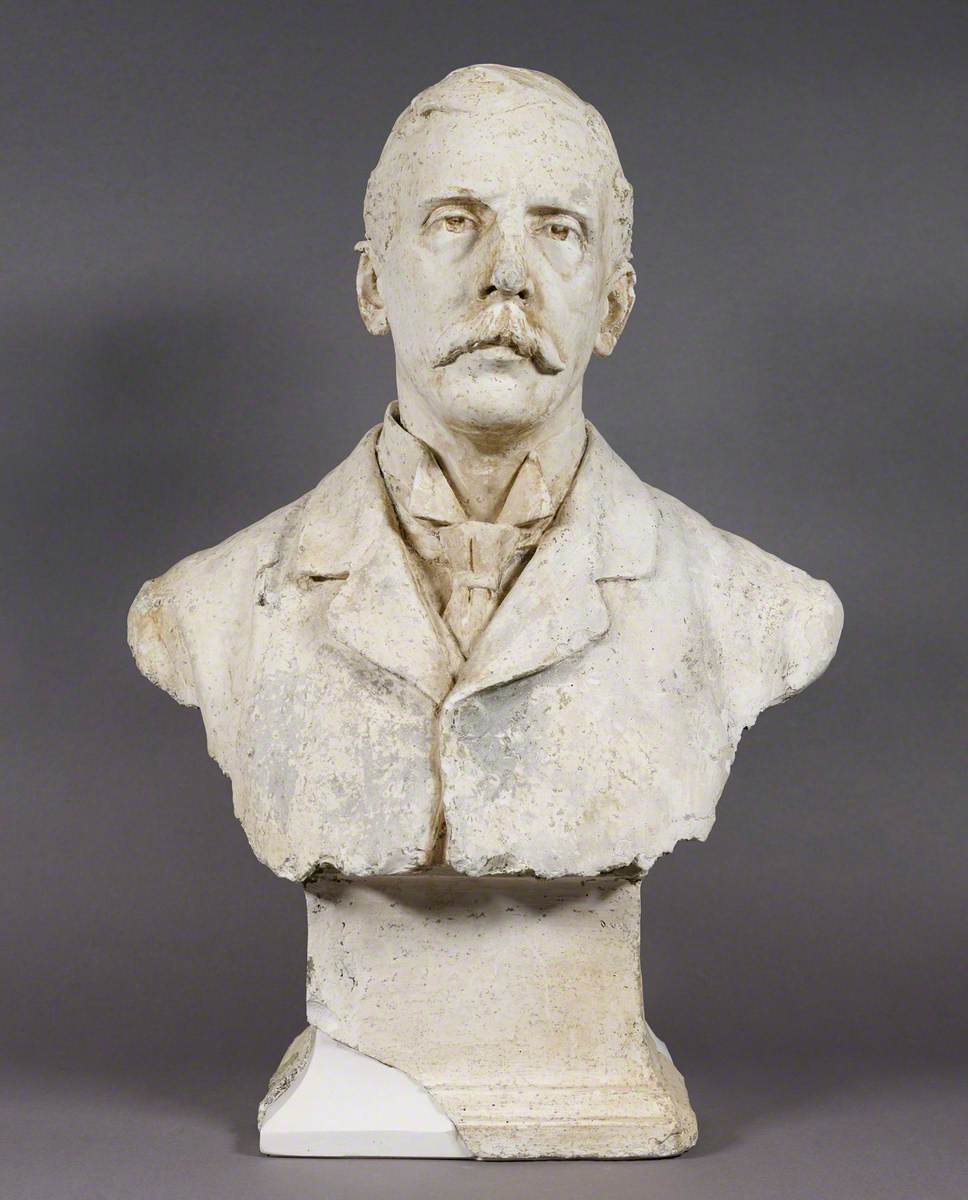
The architect, as portrayed by Michael Murphy

The building was designed by Mervyn Macartney. Macartney was the Surveyor of the Fabric of St Paul's Cathedral, was a leading figure in the Arts and Craft movement, and one of the original editorial board members of The Architectural Review.

The building is in Portland Stone, with red brick, and occasional blue brick, with four free standing Doric columns in the ground floor room.

=== 1920 seizure by unemployed persons ===
The library was completed in 1916, but its opening was postponed when it was requisitioned as a Food Control Office during World War I.

In early November 1920, a number of unemployed Islingtonians (mostly veterans) seized the still-empty library building for accommodation during the winter. The Unemployed Relief Committee representing them argued that "their work was more urgent than the provision of an additional library." The Committee made clear that they would not leave the building willingly, and did not take up the Mayor's offer of using a room in the Islington public baths instead. That winter, at least 8 other public buildings across London were seized including the Finsbury Public Library, Tottenham Town Hall, and Walthamstow Public Baths. On 18 November, the Labour Mayor and Borough Council decided to allow the Committee to use the building.

8 weeks after the seizure however, the Mayor called in the police, and forcefully evicted the Committee on 30 December 1920. The Mayor suggested that they could have stayed in the building, but "when they threatened to smash shop windows and the revolutionary element began to creep in I decided it was time to shut the place up."

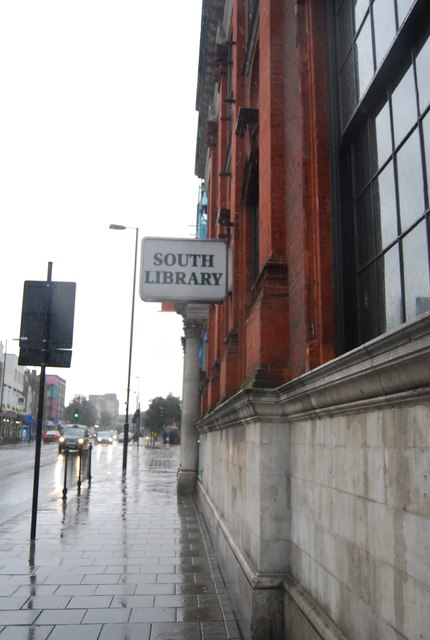
The library's name eventually changed from South-East to South

=== Opening and recent developments ===
The library was opened to the public on 21 May 1921 by Islington Mayor EH King. In the 1921/22 year, the library already loaned out 157,074 books, third in the service.

In 2021, the Council funded renovations to the library's leaking roof, and repairs to interior areas that had been affected by water infiltrations.

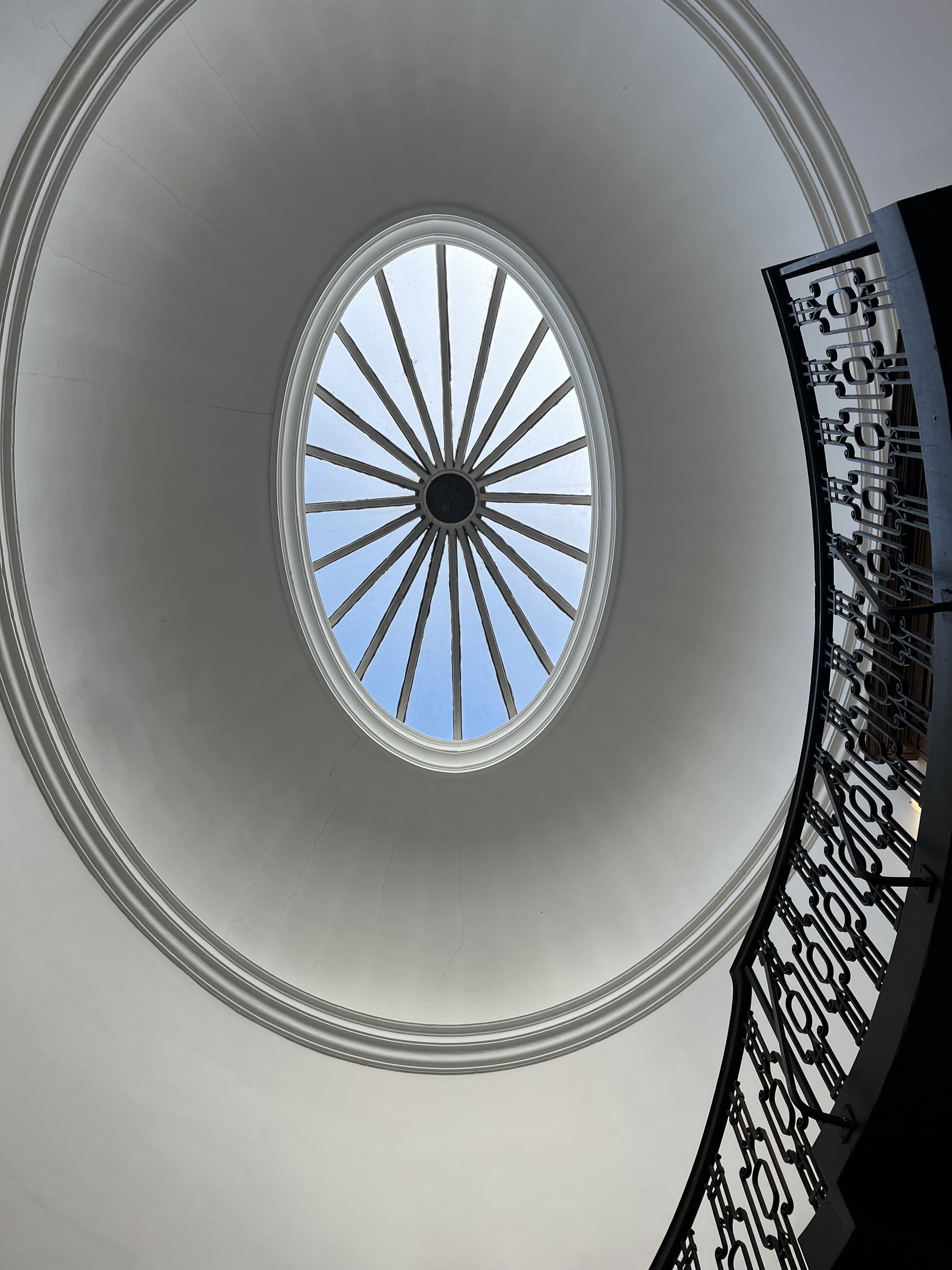
A sky-lit stairwell connects the two floors

As of 2026, the library's first floor has a large hall, while the ground floor hosts the main library, the children's library and a reading room.

== Services ==
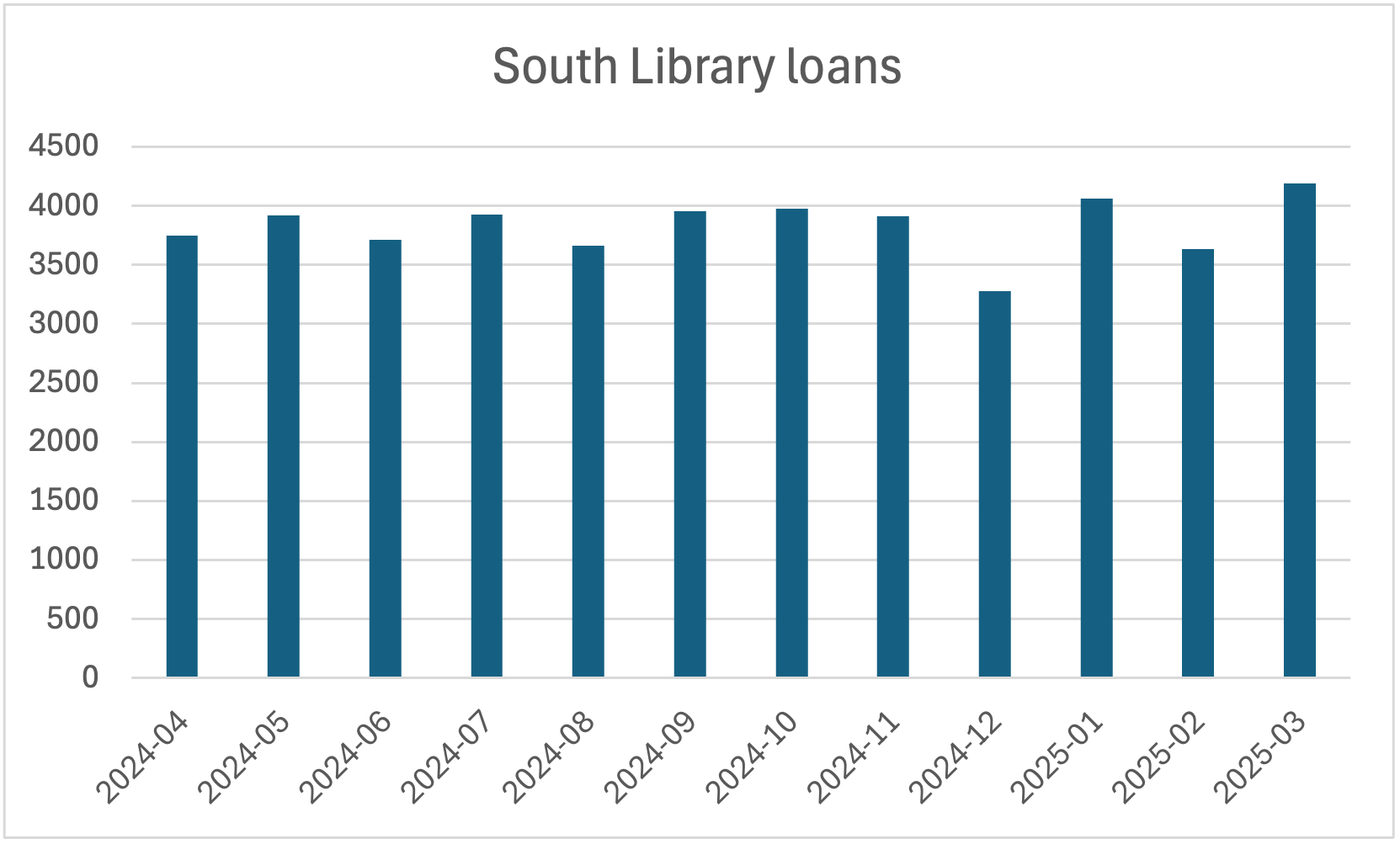
March 2025 saw the highest level of loans, with nearly 4200 items borrowed

In 2024/25, the Library had 2,612 active members (3rd in the service), and 66,794 visits over the year (6th in the service). On average, it performed 3,831 loans per month (4th in the service), with over 4,000 loans in January and March.

On top of serving as a lending library, South Library provides access to 9 free public computers, free Wi-Fi, and printing facilities.

In 2024/25, the library hosted events including included Easy Read, an adult literacy initiative which links adults to volunteer coaches. In 2024/25, South Library welcomed 4,029 attendees for events – 6% of attendees to all Islington Library events.

The library is not wheelchair accessible, with three steps to get to the Adult Library, and more for the Children's Library and Reading Room.

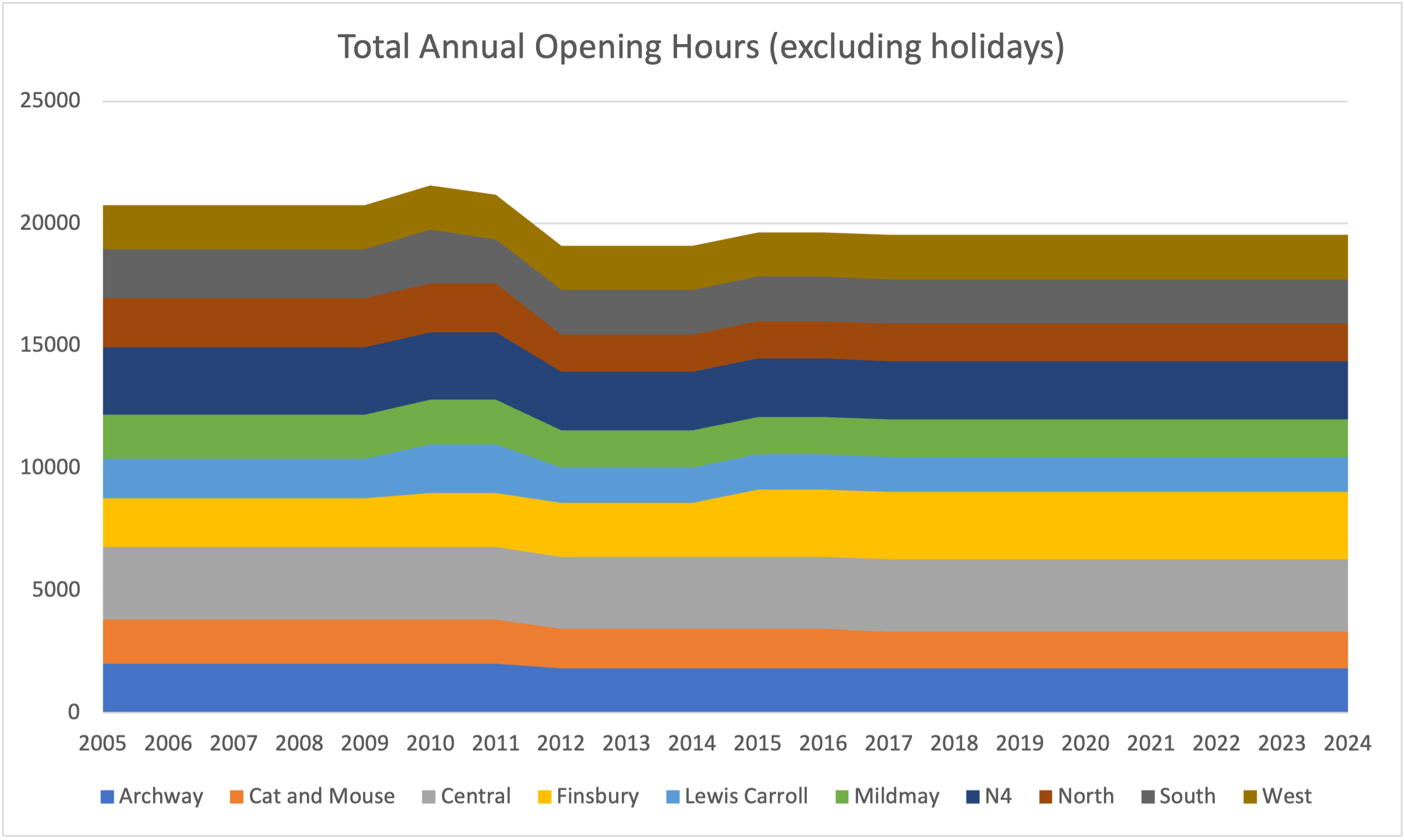
South Library saw its opening hours drop by 10% following budget cuts in 2011

Following budget cuts in 2010/2011, the South Library saw its annual opening hours cut by around 10%. In 2024, South Library was open for a total of 1816 hours, and closed on Tuesdays, Thursdays and Sundays.

== In popular culture ==
- The South Library was featured in "Reading Room," a film by Lucy Harris that explores the "striking features" of the library.
- Author Claire North referenced a number of Islington libraries in her "Dear Libraries" piece, including the South Library: "My childhood was ringed by a glorious, shimmering constellation of libraries, from Central Library with its shelves of little guides to big ideas to South Library where the kids sung nursery rhymes every Thursday afternoon, voices bouncing down the stairs."

== See also ==
- Islington Borough Council
- Islington Libraries
- Mervyn Macartney
