= Mervyn Macartney =

British architect and architectural writer (1853 – 1932)

Sir Mervyn Edmund Macartney
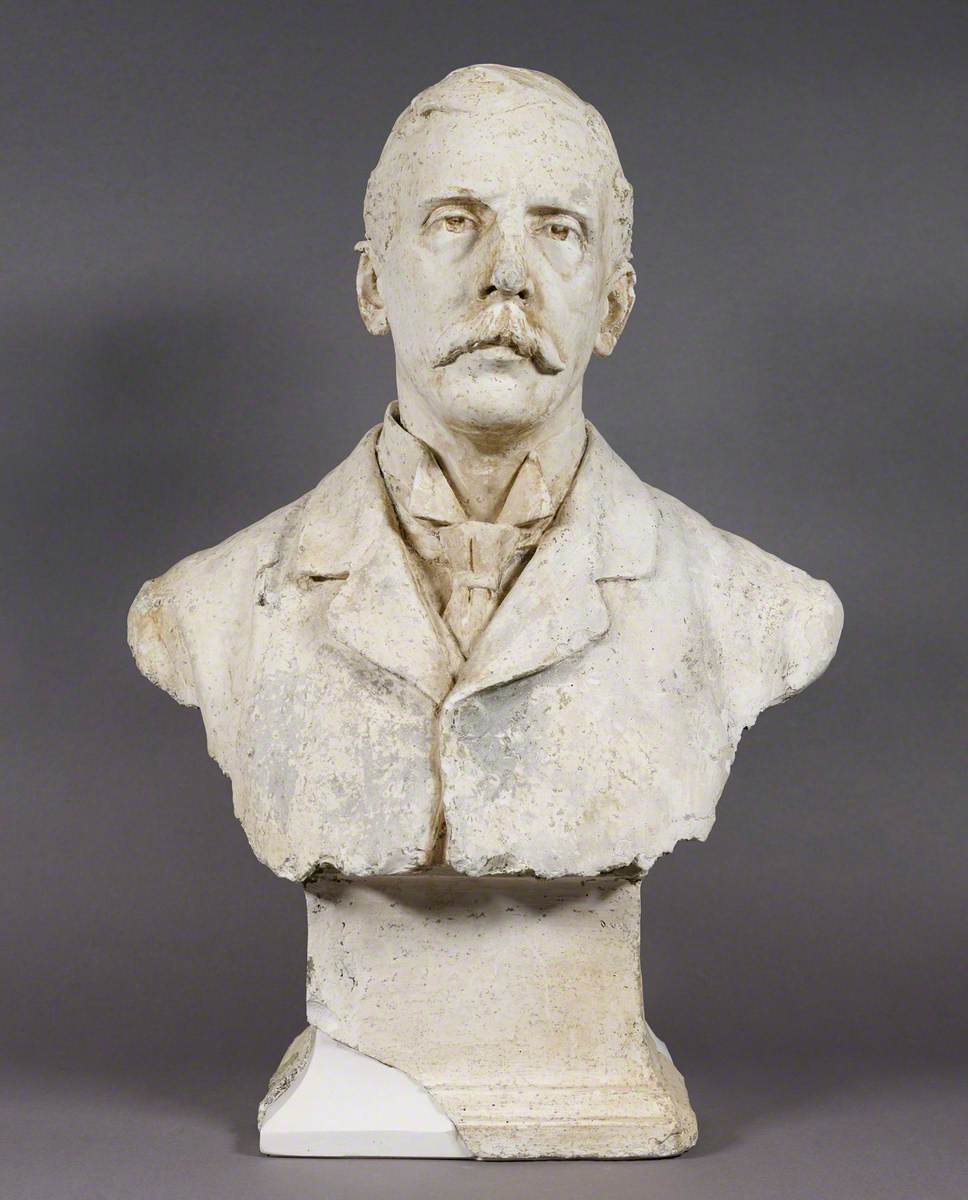
- Born: 16 September 1853
- Died: 28 October 1932 (aged 79)
- Occupation: Architect

Sir Mervyn E. Macartney FSA FRIBA (16 September 1853 – 28 October 1932) was a British architect and Surveyor of the Fabric of St Paul's Cathedral between 1906 and 1931. Macartney was a leading figure in the Arts and Craft movement, being a founder of the Art Workers' Guild and the Arts and Crafts Exhibition Society, and an influential voice as the editor of The Architectural Review and via his publications The Practical Exemplar of Architecture and Later Renaissance Architecture in England with John Belcher.

The English House 1860–1914: Catalogue to an Exhibition of Photographs and Drawings in 1980 stated that Macartney did not deserve the comparative obscurity that he has today, while Peter Davey in his 1980 book Arts and Crafts Architecture: The Search for Earthly Paradise described Macartney as the least Ruskin of the architects that came from Richard Norman Shaw's tutorage.

== Early life ==
Macartney was born in London on 16 September 1853, the youngest of the four sons of Elizabeth and Maxwell Macartney, a doctor. His half brother was the painter C. H. H. Macartney. He was privately educated until 1873 when he completed his education at Lincoln College, Oxford, before working under the tutorial of Richard Norman Shaw. Before he started his own practice he travelled across Europe visiting France, Italy and Germany. There are various dates to when Macartney started his own practice, ranging from 1877, which must be inaccurate as he was articled to Shaw at this time, to 1882. It was in 1882 that his first design from his own practice, Kent Hatch in Westerham, Kent was completed. In 1891, he married the Hon. Elizabeth Wilhelmina Ritchie, the daughter of Charles Ritchie, 1st Baron Ritchie of Dundee.

== Architectural practice ==
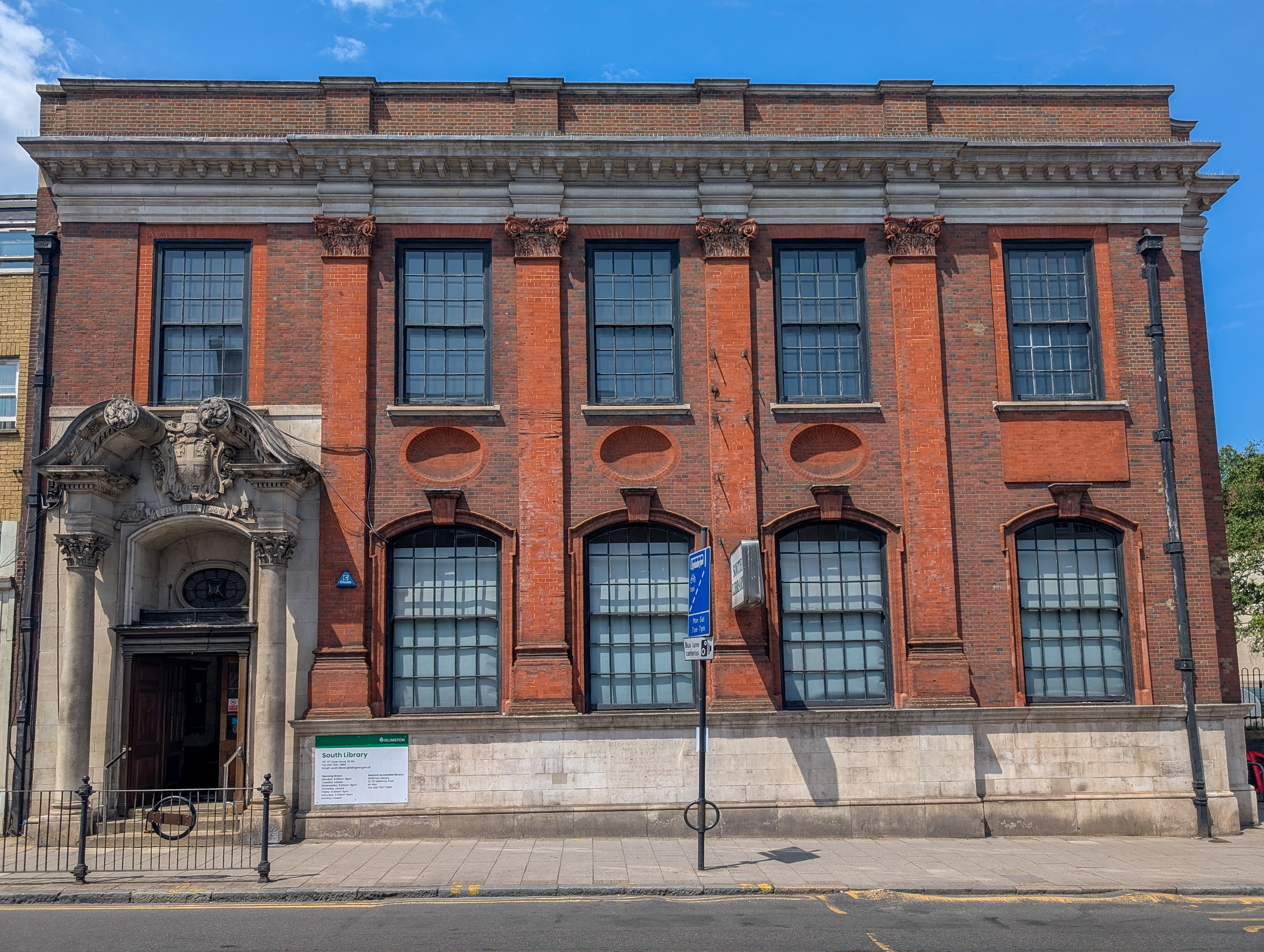
South Library, Islington

Examples of buildings and estates that Macartney worked on include:

- a pilastered conservatory at Swaylands in the Kentish Weald
- a rebuilding of St Leonard's Church, Downham in Lancashire
- The Court, Woolhampton
- South Avenue in Whiteley Village
- Egerton Place, Knightsbridge on the Smiths Charity Estate
- 169 Queen's Gate in South Kensington, London
- South Library, Islington
- Guinness Trust tenements in Draycott Avenue, Chelsea, in 1891.(Robert John Stirling was instructed to use them as a model when he came to design tenements for the Trust to the north of St Patrick's Cathedral, Dublin)
- Welders, Chalfont St. Giles (his father-in-law Charles' home)
- Newbury Town War Memorial

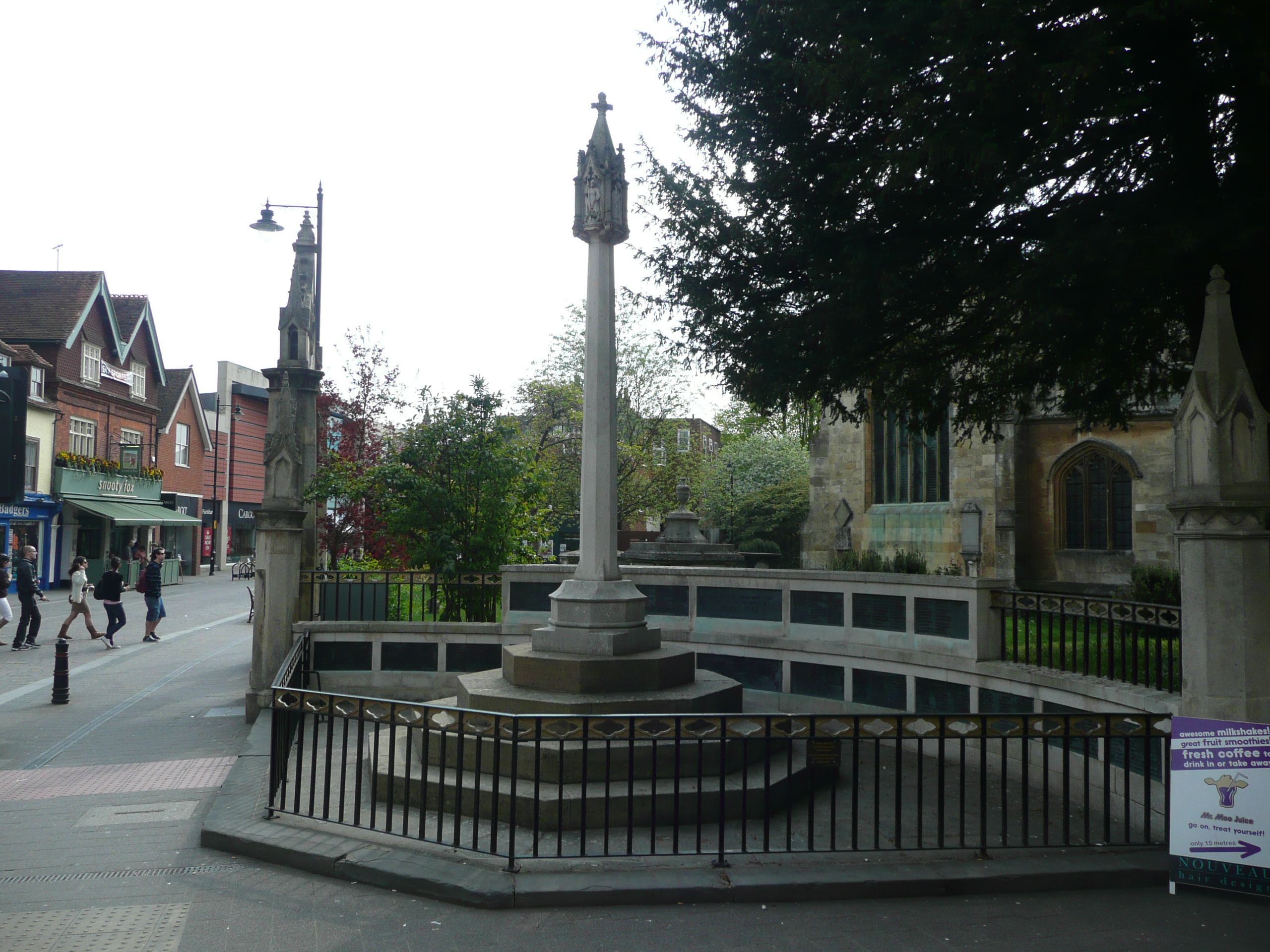
Newbury Town War Memorial by Sir Mervyn E. Macartney

In addition to his architectural designs, Macartney also designed the organ case at St Thomas Church in Winchelsea, the only known example of this type of work.

== The Architectural Review ==
Macartney was one of the original editorial board members of The Architectural Review, founded in 1896, along with Sir Reginald Blomfield, Ernest Newton and Henry Wilson. In 1896, he wrote a piece for the review criticising the redevelopment of Charing Cross Road by the Metropolitan Board of Works, which he had previously submitted plans for as part of the competition for the redevelopment. In 1903, Macartney had a disagreement with the then editor of the review, D.S. MacColl, who had criticised the 1903 Art and Crafts Exhibition Society show as being amateurish. Macartney's retort was that MacColl wasn't an architect. MacColl was sacked after another financial crisis at the journal, and Macartney replaced him as the editor for the review serving from 1905 until 1921. Under Macartney, the journal moved with the British architectural style, from being broadly devoted to Arts and Crafts architecture to increasing what is now call Edwardian Baroque. In 1913, Macartney relaunched the Review, with pages of whole pictures in a new lavish style, while new topics including The Architecture of the Liner were added. Macartney created a special issue to mark the end of World War I to celebrate the 'Great Peace' in which ideas and plans for the centre of the proposed League of Nations were shown.

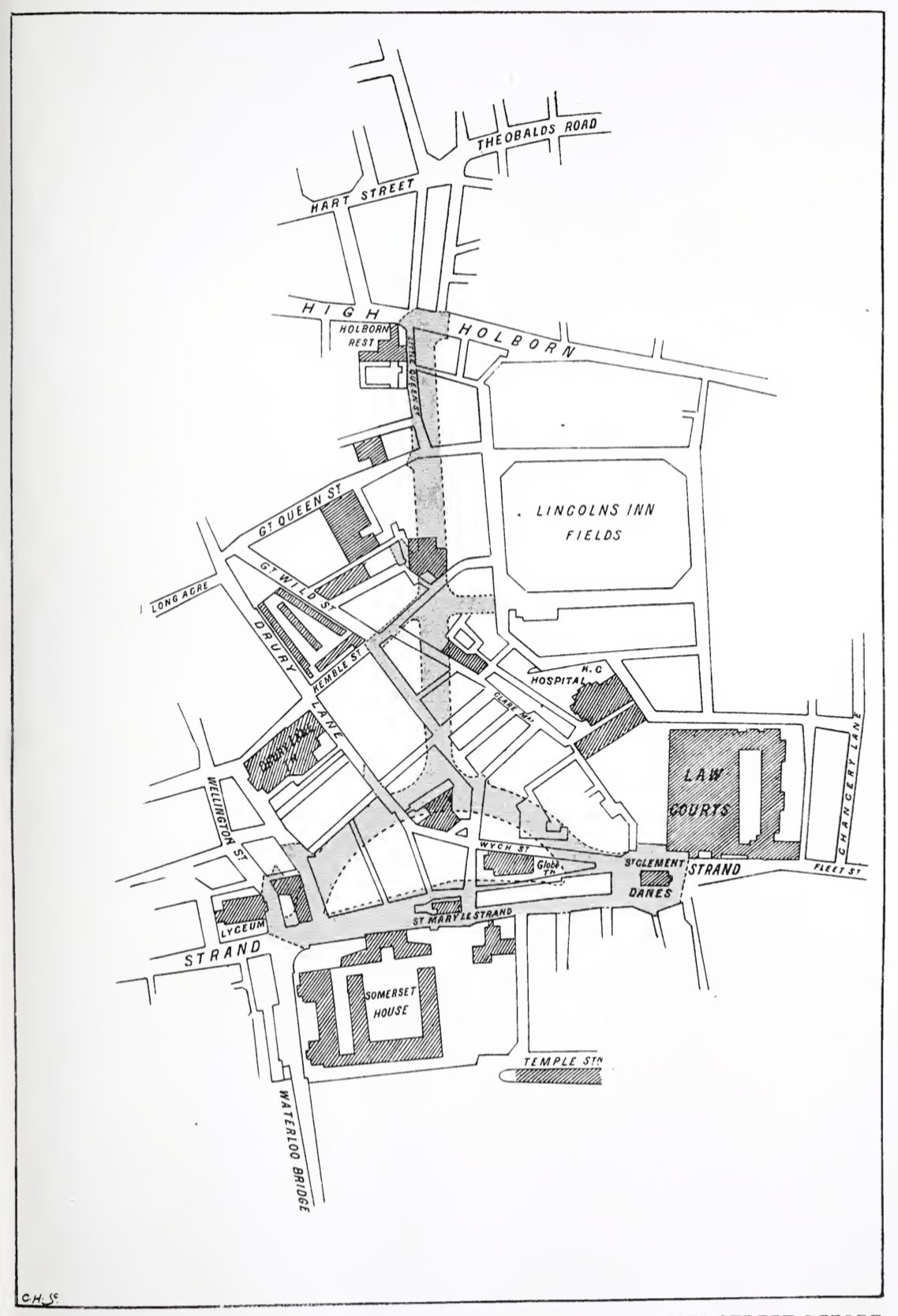
Drawing of old and new streets in redevelopment of Charing Cross Road by Macartney for The Architectural Review

== St Paul's Cathedral and Durham Cathedral ==
In February 1906, Macartney was appointed the Surveyor of the Fabric of St Paul's Cathedral and remained in the role until his resignation in November 1930. He was made the consulting architect for Durham Cathedral in 1911, replacing C. Hodgson Fowler who had died the previous year. Macartney completed extensive repairs and restoration to St Paul's during his time at the Cathedral, especially work on the piers, which Macartney said had been built of indifferent quality by various contractors. With architect Detmar Blow and sculptor Sir William Reid Dick, they designed the Kitchener Memorial in the All Souls' Chapel in St Paul's. Other work included completing the work of his predecessor as surveyor, Somers Clarke, on the St Michael and St George's Chapel, and the adding of a hot water heating system for the building and later installing fire resistance partitions to the cathedral's iconic dome. Macartney, along with W. Godfrey Allen, set the building restriction St Paul's heights to protect the view of the Cathedral's views across the city. Macartney designed the St Paul's Choristers war memorial, a timber free standing screen built by Henry Poole, which is located at the north wall of the quire aisle.

== Arts and crafts ==
Macartney was a member of the St George's Art Society, which along with fellow society, the Fifteen, promoted the unity of the arts. However, in 1884, both the Royal Academy of Arts and the Royal Institute of British Architects were seemingly trying to work against this. Macartney, along with fellow Shaw apprentices W. R. Lethaby, Edward Prior, Ernest Newton and Gerald C. Horsley, plus metal worker W. A. S. Benson, designer Heywood Sumner, painter and brother C. H. H. Macartney, sculptors Hamo Thornycroft and Edward Onslow Ford, and the architect John Belcher set about founding the Art Workers' Guild.

Macartney, along with Blomfield and John Belcher complained to The Times in 1901 about the Victoria and Albert Museum holding an exhibition of continental Art Nouveau.

== Kenton & Co. ==
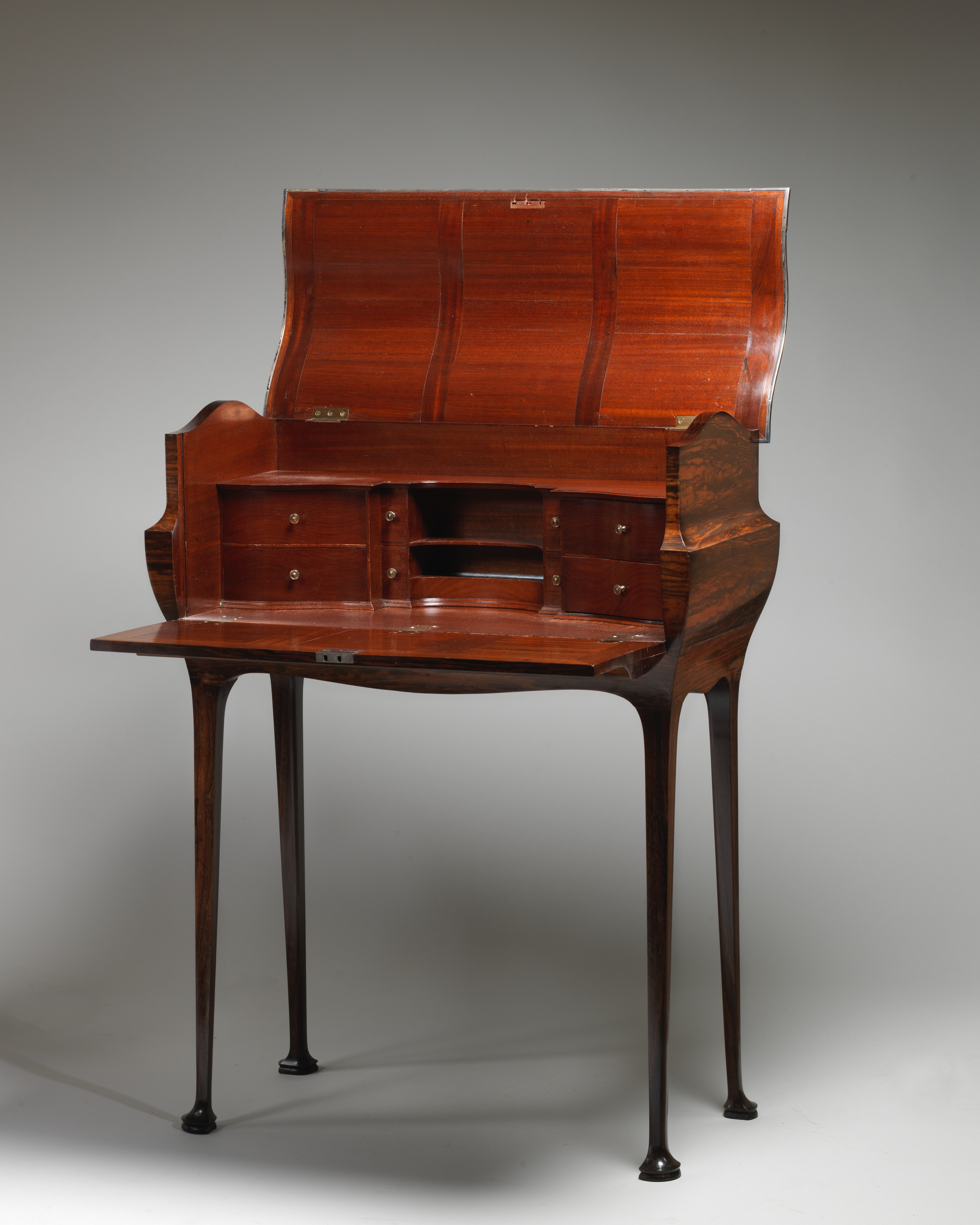
Desk designed by Mervyn Macartney, built by W. Hall for Kenton and Co. now in the collection of the Metropolitan Museum of Art

Six years after the creation of the Art Worker's Guild in 1890, he was one of the co-founders of the furniture company Kenton & Co.. His co-founders were Sidney Barnsley, Reginald Blomfield, William Lethaby, Ernest Gimson, Stephen Webb and Colonel Harold Esdaile Malet. The company had been setup with the object of designing, making and supplying furniture of excellent quality from an idea by William Lethaby and Ernest Gimson, with the formal registration in February 1891 with capital of £3000. Macartney was the company chairman and the business operated from Jubilee Place, Chelsea before moving to Brownlow Mews in Guilford Street.

Blomfield in his memoirs written during 1932 stated of the management of the business:

We used to meet in each other’s rooms, undertake designs of our own choice and invention more or less in turn, except the Colonel, who held, as it were, a watching brief on the whole proceeding. Each man was responsible solely for his own design and its execution, and it was delightful to go to the [work]shop and see one’s design growing into shape in the hands of our skilful cabinet-makers. We made no attempt to interfere with each other’s idiosyncrasies.

The company had an exhibition of their works at Barnard's Inn at Holborn, and in the January 1892 edition of Furniture and Decoration praised the design of Macartney' chairs but criticised the price of £24 for six chairs, though The British Architect, December 1891 edition

found the furniture beautiful in form, delightful because of the quality of the workmanship and reasonable in price.

Although the company had healthy sales, a further share issue was completed in January 1892 which raised £465, though £40 remained unpaid. However four months later the owners realised that the business required a further £1,000 investment to keep going, so the company was wound up and the remaining stock was distributed amongst the board members.

A desk designed by Macartney was shown at the 1893 Arts and Crafts Exhibition at the New Gallery, London, and was favorably commented on in The Cabinet Maker and Art Furnisher,

An escritoire by Mr. Mervyn Macartney….is quite a gem. Original in design, dressed up with lovely wood, and perfectly made by Mr. W. Hall, it is one of the few miniature woodwork triumphs of the exhibition. Hitherto the French have had a monopoly in dainty things of this sort. The buyer who has the means need not now go to Paris to satisfy the taste of his lady-love.

== Honours and later life ==
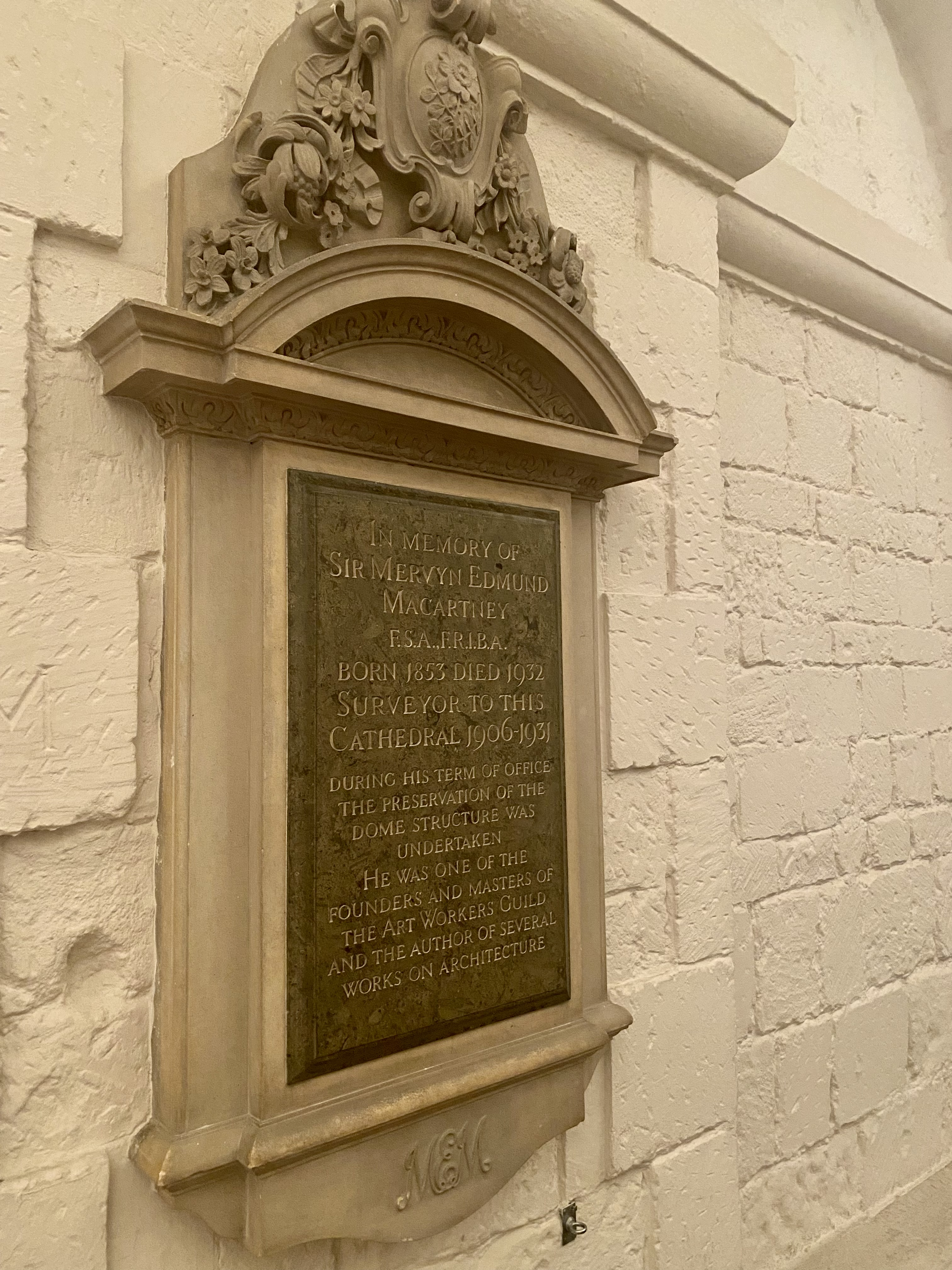
Memorial plaque to Macartney in the crypt of St. Paul's Cathedral

Macartney was elected as a Fellow of the Royal Institute of British Architects (FRIBA) in 1889, before resigning in 1891, along with John Belcher and Ernest Newton over a dispute before being reinstated in 1906. A bust of Macartney carved by Michael Murphy was exhibited at the Royal Academy of Arts in London during 1892. He was made an Honorary Corresponding Member of the American Institute of Architects (AIA) and was elected the Master of the Art Workers' Guild in 1899. Macartney died on 28 October 1932.

== Publications ==
- Later Renaissance Architecture in England (1901)
- English Houses and Gardens in the 17th and 18th Centuries (1908)
- The Practical Exemplar of Architecture (1908–27)
