= Surveyor of the Fabric of St Paul's Cathedral =

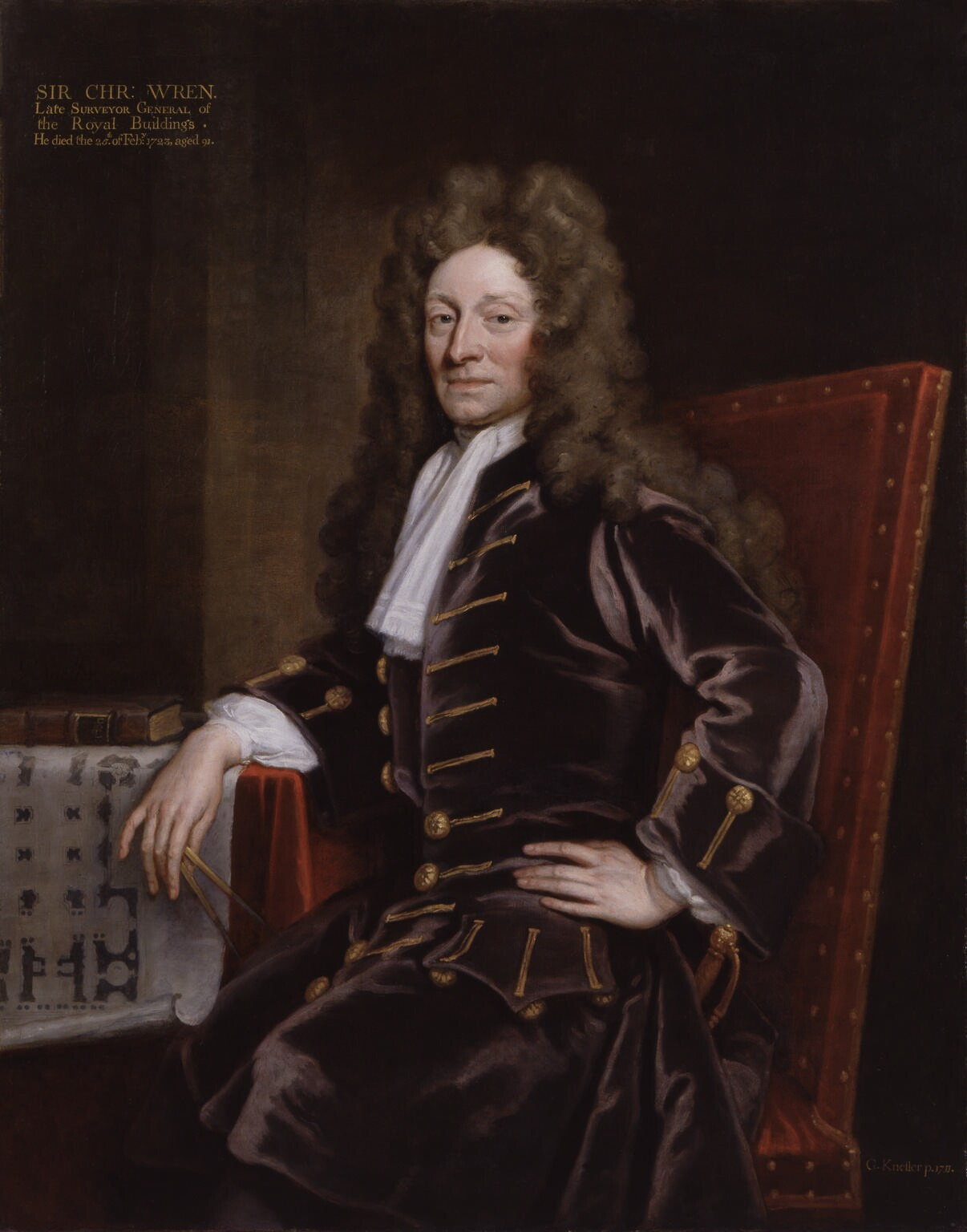
Sir Christopher Wren, first Surveyor of the Fabric of St Paul's Cathedral. 1711 portrait by Godfrey Kneller.

The post of Surveyor of the Fabric of St Paul's Cathedral was established in 1675. (Note: In 1669, Wren had been appointed Surveyor-General of the King's Works, a post that included responsibility for St Paul's Cathedral. This list starts from 1675, the year the foundation stone was laid for the new St Paul's Cathedral, the old cathedral having been mostly destroyed in the Great Fire of London in 1666.) The role is an architectural one, with the current holder being responsible for the upkeep and maintenance of the cathedral and its buildings. (Note: For more on the modern evolution of the role and related guidance and legislation, see Cathedral Architect.) In the past, the role has involved overseeing new construction work as well as restoration and architectural conservation. The post has been held by the following people:

1. Christopher Wren (1675–1723)
2. John James (1723–1746)
3. Henry Flitcroft (1746–1756)
4. Stiff Leadbetter (1756–1766)
5. Robert Mylne (1766–1811)
6. Samuel Pepys Cockerell (1811–1819)
7. Charles Robert Cockerell (1819–1852)
8. Francis Penrose (1852–1897)
9. Somers Clarke (1897–1906)
10. Mervyn Edmund Macartney (1906–1931)
11. Walter Godfrey Allen (1931–1956)
12. John Seely, Lord Mottistone (1956–1963)
13. Paul Edward Paget (1963–1969)
14. Bernard Feilden (1969–1977)
15. Robert Potter (1978–1984)
16. William Whitfield (1985–1990)
17. Martin Stancliffe (1990–2011)
18. Oliver Caroe (2011–present)
