= Carlile Henry Hayes Macartney =

British painter

- Born: 8 March 1842; Britain
- Died: 1924 (aged 81–82)
- Known for: Painter
- Movement: Orientalist

Carlile Henry Hayes Macartney (1842–1924) was a British painter and Orientalist, noted for his portraits.

== Life and career ==
Macartney was born on 3 March 1842 to Maxwell Macartney, a doctor, and Maxwell's first wife Emily Eliza Hayes. He was a student at Clare College, graduating in 1866. As well as a painter Macartney was an orientalist academic, producing several English versions of oriental text and a barrister at the Inner Temple. Macartney, along with his half brother, Sir Mervyn Macartney, were amongst the founders of the Art Workers' Guild in 1884. Macartney lived at Foxholds House, Thatcham which was designed by Sir Mervyn Macartney in 1895, and is now home to the regional office of English Nature. He married Louisa Gardiner and their son Carlile Aylmer Macartney was a noted academic specialising in the history and politics of East-Central Europe and in particular the history of Austria and Hungary.

== Work ==
Macartney painted both landscapes and portraits, exhibiting them at Dudley Museum and Art Gallery, the Grosvenor Gallery, the Walker Art Gallery, Manchester City Art Gallery and at the Royal Academy of Art.

Several of his paintings are in the collections of the Tate Gallery, Royal Society of Medicine, British Dental Association Dental Museum and the Government Art Collection.

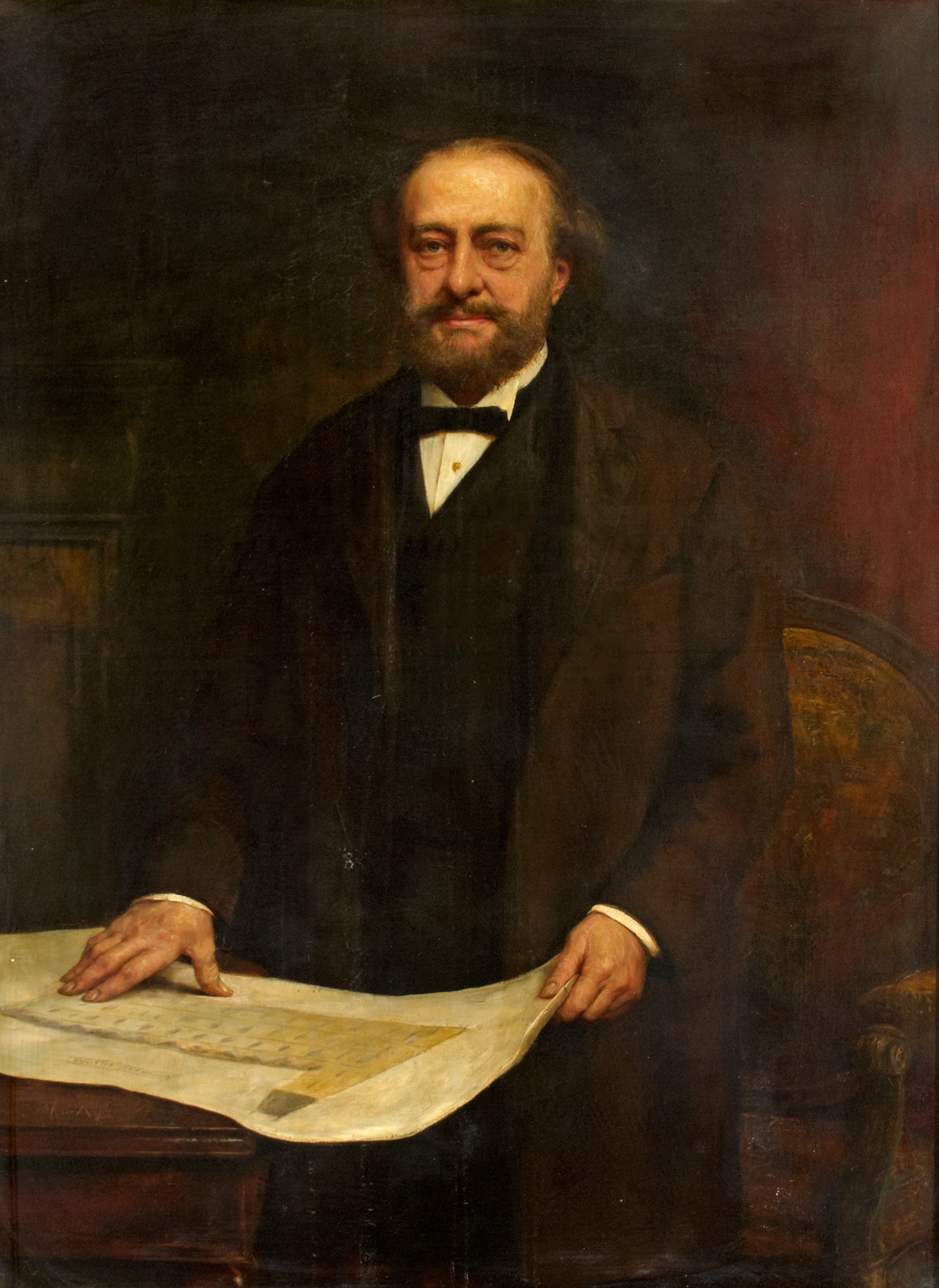
Portrait of Edwin Saunders, (English dentist), 1884

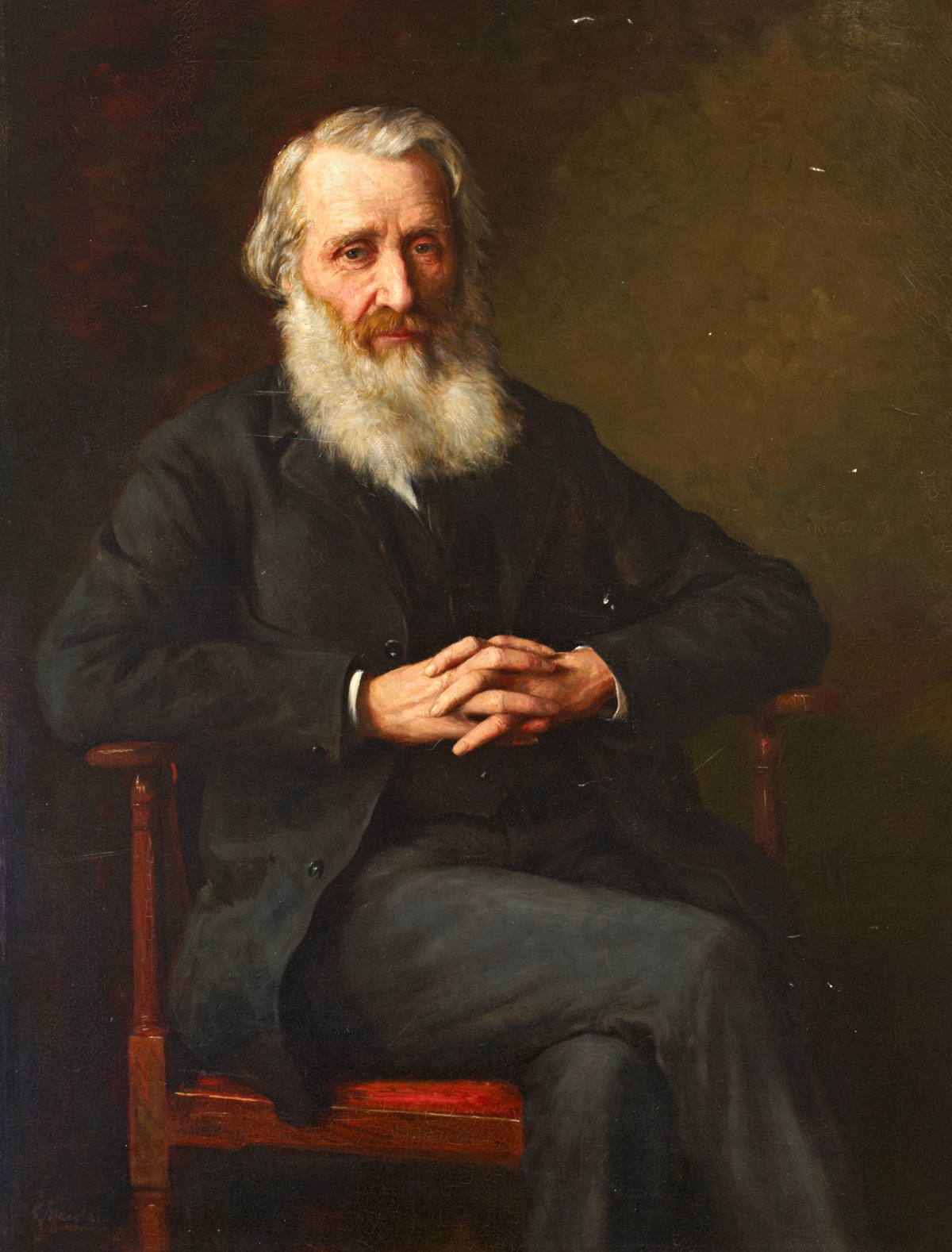
Portrait of John Tomes Macartney, (English dental surgeon), late 19th-century

== See also ==
- List of Orientalist artists
- Orientalism
