= Gerald Cobb =

British artist and historian (1900–1986)

Gerald Cobb (1900–1986) MVO FSA was a heraldic artist. He developed an interest in photography that lasted throughout his life and built up a collection of architectural images, some of which appear in books on architectural history and archives in libraries and national collections.

== Biography ==
Cobb was born at Ivy Lodge, Reading, Berkshire, one of four sons of banker's clerk Joseph William Cobb and Florence Kate, née Arnold. Cobb trained as an artist in Reading at the University Extension College.

Cobb served as a Fire Warden at St. Paul's Cathedral in the Second World War and his skills and interests involved him helping in the preservation of the fabric of the cathedral. He also compiled information on ecclesiastical structures across the country during this period. He died in London in 1986, the death registered in June of that year.

== Working life ==
In 1919 Cobb was introduced to the College of Arms and went on to be a heraldic artist of some distinction, becoming Her Majesty Queen Elizabeth II's artist at the college around 1953. Cobb was noted by his peers as a fine draughtsman and for his use of colour. He was also cited as having influenced fellow heraldic artists and was singled out for praise as an artist of exceptional ability. Cobb kept his room at the college until 1982, four years before his death. He was appointed a Member of the Royal Victorian Order in 1968.

== Collector, architectural historian and ecclesiologist ==
These three interests, which Cobb developed with great assiduity, ran alongside his professional practice.

=== Collector ===
In his younger adult life, Cobb began collecting photographs from a range of sources but mostly from everyday places such as markets and second hand shops, some of which were situated close to his workplace in the City of London. His own published works (see below) contain a number of images from his collection. For the epic series, 'The Buildings of England', the architectural historian, Nicklaus Pevsner used examples from Cobb's collection in volumes including: Volume 12, London.

Cobb's collection, and the use to which it was put, led to his being described as "a pioneer in using photographs as a key tool in architectural records..." The collection itself is now mainly deposited at the National Archives. The Conway Library at the Courtauld Institute of Art also holds images from his collection.

=== Architectural historian and ecclesiologist ===
Linked to the main subject matter of his collection, Cobb pursued his interest in ecclesiastical buildings. He held membership of the Ecclesiological Society, where he had been vice president in 1976, the Art Workers' Guild, where he was elected Master in 1953, and was elected a member of the Society of Antiquaries. His scholarly contribution to the study and appreciation of cathedrals and churches, as well as the substantial number of photographic images, has been recognised through his many published works and the tributes paid by his peers to his expertise and influence.

== Selected published works ==
=== As author ===
- The City of London Guildhall Library contains a substantial number of his written works and guides. His works are available in libraries in many countries in the world.
- English Cathedrals: The Forgotten Centuries: Restoration and Change from 1530 to the Present Day
- The Old Churches of London
- London City Churches

In their book, London: The City Churches, Simon Bradley and Nikolaus Pevsner recommend Cobb's City of London Churches as "the best overall survey of the churches and their fittings, including the medieval period."

=== As illustrator ===
- The Colour of Chivalry by Harold B Pereira
