= Harold Speed =

English painter (1872–1957)

Harold Speed (11 February 1872 – 20 March 1957) was an English painter in oil and watercolour of portraits, figures and historical subjects. He also wrote instructional books for artists that remain in print.

Born in London, the son of Edward Speed, an architect, he studied architecture at the Royal College of Art, but soon took up painting, and continued his studies at the Royal Academy Schools between 1891 and 1896, winning a gold medal and a travelling scholarship in 1893. In 1896, he was elected as a member of the Royal Society of Portrait Painters. Speed was a member of the Art Workers' Guild and was elected as its Master in 1916. Later, he was elected a member of the New Society of Artists.

He exhibited at the Royal Academy from 1893, and held his first one-man exhibition in 1907 at the Leicester Galleries. His work was part of the painting event in the art competition at the 1928 Summer Olympics. In 1930 he provided paintings for the new chapel of Wesley House, Cambridge.

Speed lived in Watlington, Oxfordshire and London, where he died on 20 March 1957.

Because of their intelligent combination of useful advice and sensitive reflection on the nature and meaning of artistic practice, Harold Speed's instructional manuals on drawing and painting have long been considered valuable resources for artists. There are editions of his manual "The Practice and Science of Drawing" (1913) in the public domain. His other publications include The Science and Practice of Oil Painting (1924) and What is the Good of Art? (1936).

== Sources ==
- "Biography". ArtMagick. Archived from the original on 8 January 2009.
- Waters, Grant M. (1975). Dictionary of British Artists Working 1900-1950. Eastbourne Fine Art. ISBN 0-902010-05-0.
- Speed, Harold (1913). The Practice and Science of Drawing. London: Seeley, Service & Co.
