= Surveyor of the Fabric of Westminster Abbey =

British architectural post

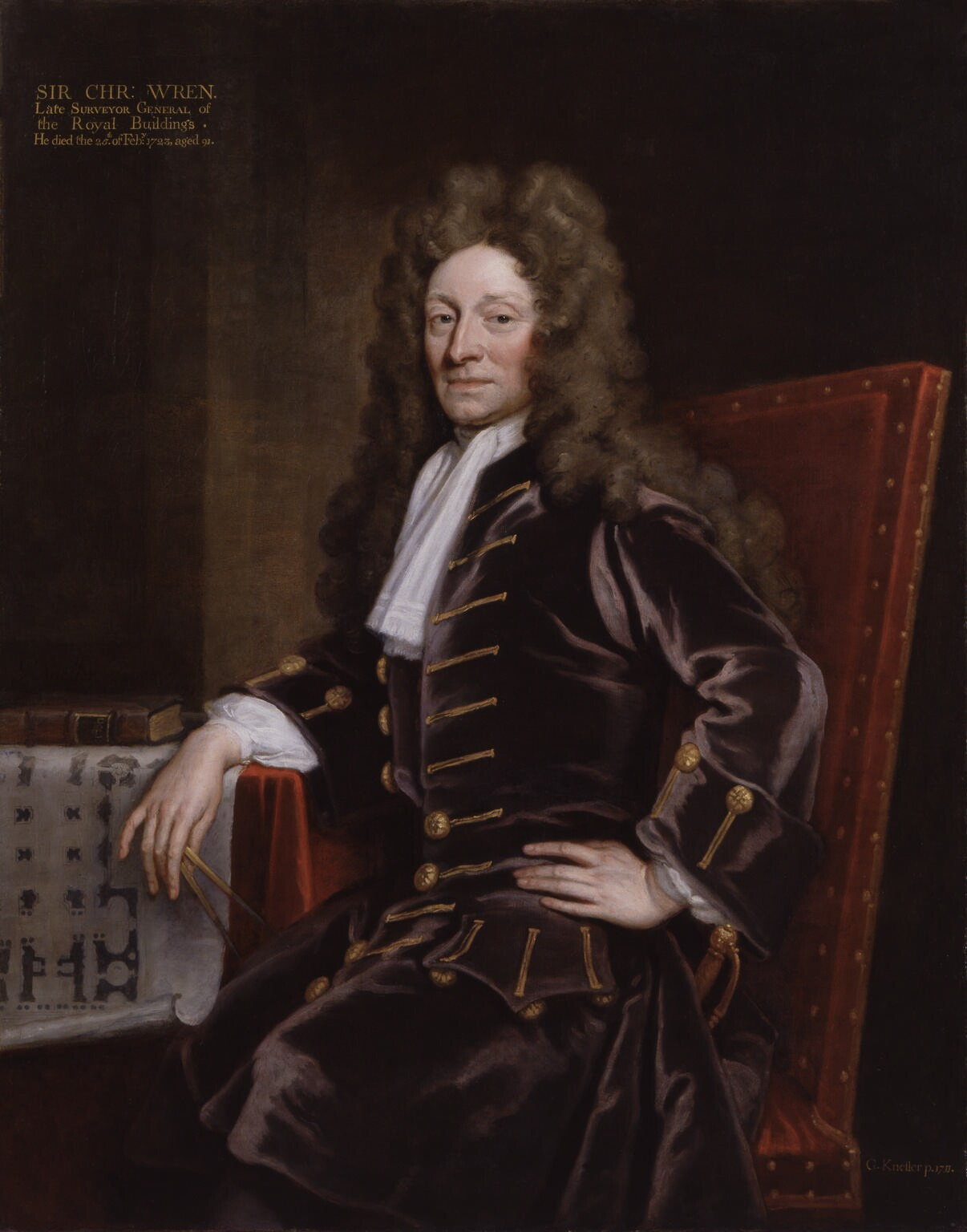
Portrait of Sir Christopher Wren by Godfrey Kneller, 1711. Wren was the first Surveyor of the Fabric of Westminster Abbey

The post of Surveyor of the Fabric of Westminster Abbey was established in 1698. (Note: Alcuin Club Collections, Volume 38 (1952), page 223, Appendix VIII ('The Surveyors of Westminster Abbey') lists the Fabric Surveyors, the College Surveyors and the Deputy Fabric Surveyors from 1698 (from 1660 for the College Surveyors) to 1952. The 2003 edition of the relevant volume from Pevsner's The Buildings of England series gives a similar list, but disagrees on the transition year between Pearson (who died on 11 December 1897) and Micklethwaite, giving the transition year as 1898 instead of 1897. Pevsner also (incorrectly) gives the transition year between Buttress and Burton as 1995.) The role is an architectural one, with the current holder being responsible for the upkeep and maintenance of the Abbey and its buildings. (Note: For more on the modern evolution of the role and related guidance and legislation, see Cathedral Architect.) In the past, the role has involved overseeing new construction work as well as restoration and architectural conservation. The post has been held by the following people:

1. Christopher Wren (1698–1723) (Note: Wren was appointed Surveyor of Westminster Abbey following an Act of Parliament to fund repairs to the Abbey. Upon his death, Wren was buried in St Paul's Cathedral. As of 2018, nine of his successors as Surveyors of the Fabric have been buried, or been commemorated, or had their ashes interred in Westminster Abbey: James Wyatt, Scott, Pearson, Micklethwaite, Lethaby, Tapper, Peers, Bower and Foster.)
2. Nicholas Hawksmoor (1723–1736)
3. John James (1736–1746)
4. James Horne (1746–1752)
5. Henry Keene (1752–1776)
6. James Wyatt (1776–1813)
7. Benjamin Dean Wyatt (1813–1827)
8. Edward Blore (1827–1849)
9. George Gilbert Scott (1849–1878)
10. John Loughborough Pearson (1878–1897)
11. John Thomas Micklethwaite (1897–1906)
12. William Lethaby (1906–1928)
13. Walter Tapper (1928–1935)
14. Charles Reed Peers (1935–1951)
15. Stephen Dykes Bower (1951–1973)
16. (John) Peter Foster (1973–1988)
17. Donald Buttress (1988–1999)
18. John Burton (1999–2012)
19. Ptolemy Dean (2012–present)
