= Marthe Armitage =

British wallpaper designer

- Born: Chiswick, London, England
- Known for: Wallpaper designer

Marthe Armitage is a British wallpaper designer whose work is characterized by unique hand-drawn designs that are hand printed from lino blocks, varying in size. She makes designs for wallpapers, and curtains.

== Early life ==
After World War II, Armitage studied at the Chelsea School of Art, where she trained to be a painter.

== Career ==
In the 1950s, after she was married and had children, Armitage started designing and making lino-cut wallpaper. Over time, she became known for her hand-drawn and hand-printed designs.

After sketching the design, she uses hand-cut lino blocks and a century-old offset lithographic printing press to create custom-printed rolls of wallpaper. She works in a studio in her garage, where she keeps her printing press. Her daughter, Joanna Broadhurst, works as her assistant.

In 1993 she was elected as Master of the Art Workers' Guild.

In 2004, the historic wallpaper design company Hamilton Weston agreed to represent her work. Sigmar London also sell her work. She designed a wallpaper she entitled "Alphabet" for The Woman in Black, which was created for the film which is based on Susan Hill’s ghost story. Armitage's designs cover the nursery, which is haunted, with automata. The nursery is featured in the scenes where Daniel Radcliffe's character faces off with the titular character.

As of 2020, Armitage was also producing wallpapers through digital processes. In 2018 she was commissioned to create digitally printed wallpaper on vinyl, for the West Middlesex University Hospital in Isleworth, West London.
