= Brian Webb =

- Born: January 15, 1945 (age 80); Chester, England
- Occupation(s): Graphic designer, author, art director

Brian Webb (born January 15, 1945) is a graphic designer and director of Webb & Webb Design Limited.

Brian Webb initially trained as a technical illustrator at Liverpool College of Art but later moved to Canterbury with the intention of working in television. In 1971, Webb moved to London and founded Trickett & Webb with Lynn Trickett. His work is in the permanent collections of the V&A, London and MoMA, New York.

For Camberwell press, he edited and designed Submarine Dream, a book of Eric Ravilious’ wartime lithographs (1996) and A Thousand Years A Thousand Words, a celebration of Royal Mail Millennium Stamp project, 2000. For the University of the Arts, Webb curated exhibitions and designed catalogues for Sir Peter Blake's Sculpture and Commercial Art shows from 2003 to 2004. In 2008 Webb was elected as Master of the Art Workers' Guild. Webb's work appeared in the 2008 London Transport Posters, a Century of Art and Design published by Lund Humphries and in the 2010 Think of it as a Poster, for the Fleece Press.

Brian Webb was a fellow and past president of the Chartered Society of Designers, a fellow of the University College of the Creative Arts (now the University for the Creative Arts), a visiting professor at the University of the Arts London, and a Royal Society of the Arts Student Design Bursary judge.

== Books ==
- Design series by Brian Webb and Peyton Skipwith, Antique Collectors' Club Ltd (2005-2013)
- Edward Bawden's London by Brian Webb and Peyton Skipwith, V & A Publishing (3 October 2011). (978-1851776559)
- Edward Bawden's Kew Gardens by Brian Webb and Peyton Skipwith, V & A Publishing (7 April 2014). (978-1851777792)
