= W. Godfrey Allen =

Allen in 1942.

W. Godfrey Allen FSA FRIBA (1891–1986), full name Walter Godfrey Allen, was an architect in the twentieth century.

== Life ==
He was Surveyor of the Fabric of St Paul's Cathedral from 1931 to 1956. He devised the St. Paul's Heights policy in 1937, a policy to stop the views of St. Paul's being blocked by tall buildings. He lived and worked in Priory Row, Faversham, and is commemorated there by a plaque on his old home. In 1951, he started a second term as the Prime Warden of the Worshipful Company of Goldsmiths. He was appointed a Commissioner for the Royal Commission on the Historical Monuments of England on 9 June 1952. He declined a British honour of Commander (CBE) in 1957.

Allan is jointly credited with designing a number of features in St Paul's with Stephen Dykes Bower. He was Master of the Art Workers Guild in 1953. He retired from Royal Institute of British Architects in 1970.
