= Cathedral Architect =

Person responsible for Anglican Cathedral maintenance

A Cathedral Architect or Surveyor of the Fabric for the Cathedral is a person appointed to a Cathedral of the Church of England under section 9(1)(f) of the Cathedrals Measure 1999. The administrative body of the cathedral, the Chapter, is required to consult the Cathedrals Fabric Commission for England before making an appointment.

== Role ==
The Cathedral Architect or Surveyor of the Fabric has a key professional and statutory role covering everything that relates to the fabric of the cathedral. This includes all decisions affecting the cathedral's structure, contents, furnishings and setting. The Cathedral Architect or Surveyor to the Fabric will normally have the responsibility of overseeing all of the repair and conservation work to the cathedral and other buildings within the Cathedral's precincts.

The Cathedral Architect or Surveyor of the Fabric will usually advise the Cathedral Chapter on all aspects of the fabric, including aesthetic issues, and when major construction works or new buildings are under consideration, if not appointed to the work, will usually be involved in the preparation of the design brief and will remain as guardian of the fabric while the work is under construction.

== Duties ==
The Cathedral Architect or Surveyor of the Fabric has the following statutory duties:

- to prepare a report in writing every five years on any works that are needed, and their urgency. The report must be based on an inspection of the fabric and made in consultation with the Cathedral Archaeologist.
- each year to make a report containing a summary of the work carried out during the previous year, an account of work in progress and any other matter that is relevant to the care and conservation of the cathedral.

== See also ==
- Surveyor of the Fabric of Westminster Abbey
- Surveyor of the Fabric of St Paul's Cathedral
