= London Craft Week =

- Status: Active
- Genre: Art and design
- Frequency: Annual
- Location: throughout London
- Country: England
- Years active: 2015–present
- Founder: Guy Salter
- Most recent: 2025
- Attendance: 250,000
- Website: www.londoncraftweek.com

London Craft Week is held annually in May. The week-long event includes a programme of over 200 events, including talks and open houses, showcasing art, design, and culture. These events are usually in buildings around London that already produce or display art and design.

London Craft Week is a private not-for-profit organisation.

The launch event for the London Craft Week was held in Bloomsbury in February 2015, and was attended by Prince Charles.
