= Portrait of Sir Christopher Wren =

1711 painting by Godfrey Kneller

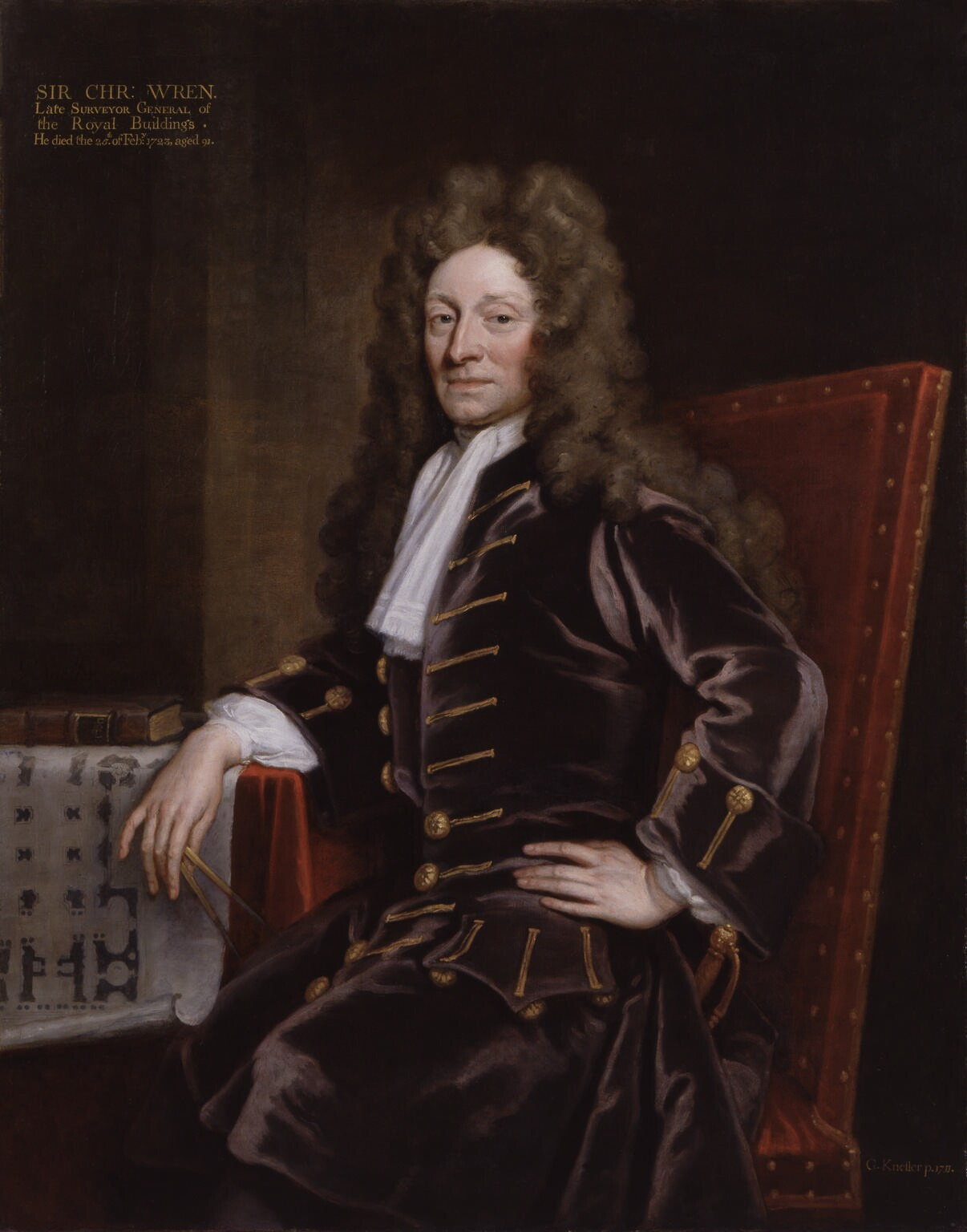
- Artist: Godfrey Kneller
- Year: 1711
- Type: Oil on canvas, portrait
- Dimensions: 124.5 cm × 100.3 cm (49.0 in × 39.5 in)
- Location: National Portrait Gallery, London

Portrait of Sir Christopher Wren is an oil on canvas portrait painting by the German-born British artist Godfrey Kneller of the English architect Christopher Wren, from 1711. Wren, a polymath, is best known for his design of St Paul's Cathedral along with multiple other buildings in the English Baroque style. It was painted during the reign of Queen Anne, when the cathedral that Wren had designed many years earlier was nearing completion. He is shown as a veteran, established personality, at the age of seventy nine. His right hand holds a pair of compasses and rests on a plan of St Paul's.

Kneller was the leading portraitist in Britain of the late seventeenth and early eighteenth century. The work was acquired by the National Portrait Gallery in London in 1860. Copies exist in All Souls, Oxford, Chelsea Hospital and the deanery of St Paul's Cathedral.

== Bibliography ==
- Hollis, Leo. The Phoenix: St. Paul's Cathedral And The Men Who Made Modern London. Hachette UK, 2011.
- Ingamells, John. National Portrait Gallery Later Stuart Portraits, 1685–1714. National Portrait Gallery, 2009.
- Jardine, Lisa. On a Grander Scale: The Outstanding Career of Sir Christopher Wren. HarperCollins, 2003.
- Piper, David. Catalogue of the Seventeenth Century Portraits in the National Portrait Gallery 1625–1714. 1963
- Tinniswood, Adrian. His Invention So Fertile. Random House, 2010.
